= List of 2 euro commemorative coins (2010–2019) =

Commemorative coins of the Eurozone 2010-2019

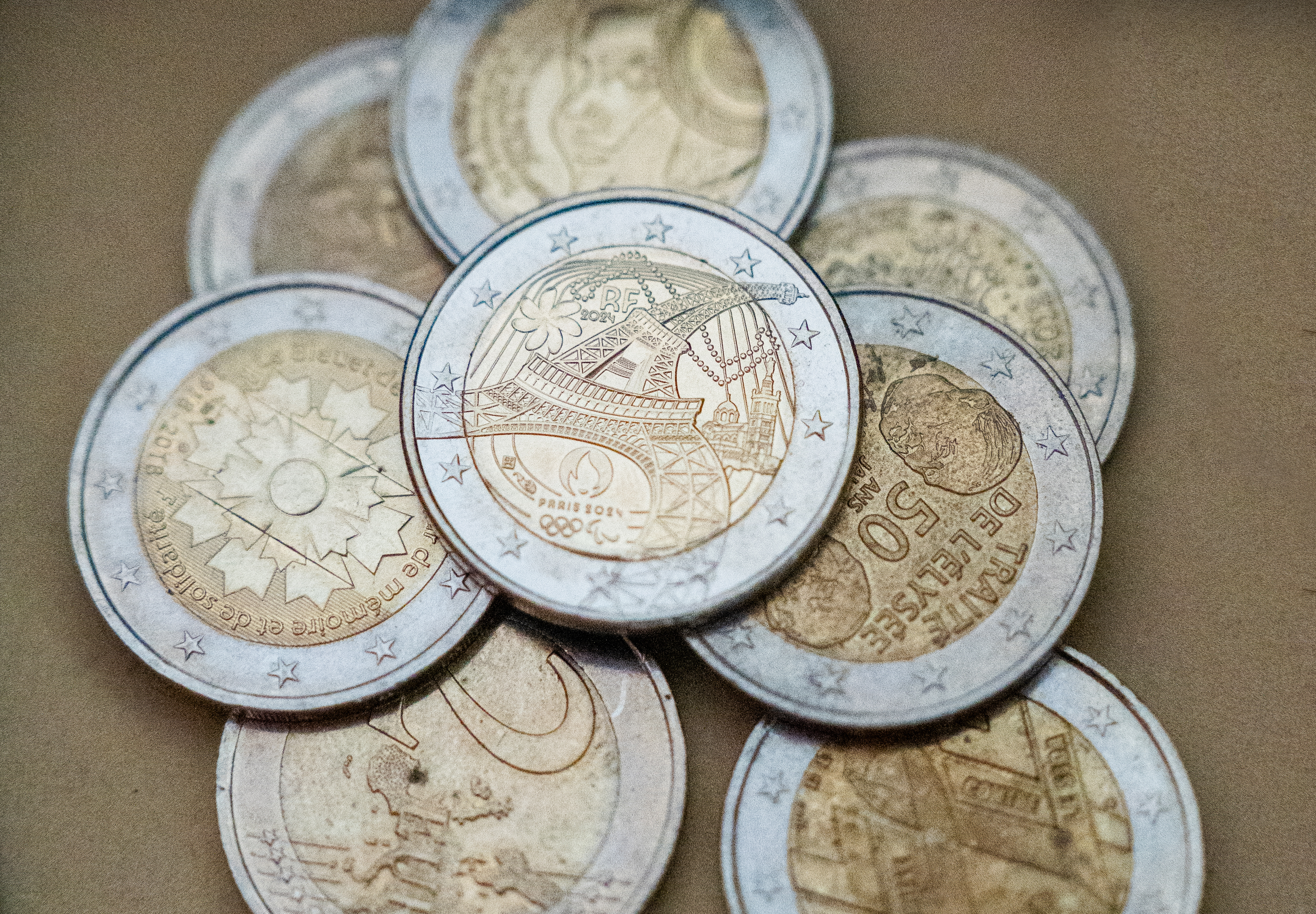
2 euro commemorative coins

€2 commemorative coins are special euro coins that have been minted and issued by member states of the eurozone since 2004 as legal tender in all eurozone member states.

€2 coins are the only denomination intended for circulation that may be issued as commemorative coins. Only the national obverse sides of the commemorative coins differ; the common reverse sides do not. The coins typically commemorate the anniversaries of historical events or current events of special importance.

Since 2012, the number of commemorative coins has been limited to two per country per year; previously only one was allowed. Issues of common commemoratives do not count towards the limit. The total number of commemorative coins placed in circulation per year is also limited. The commemorative coins must follow the design standards stipulated for regular €2 coins, with design limitations to guarantee uniformity.

Up to the end of 2025, 584 variations of €2 commemorative coins have been issued (including three scheduled coins from Vatican City). Finland, Italy, Luxembourg, San Marino and the Vatican City are the only countries to have released at least one commemorative coin every year since 2004.

Though they have become collectibles, €2 commemoratives are different from non-standard denomination commemorative euro coins, which are officially designated as "collector coins", not intended for circulation and usually made of precious metals.

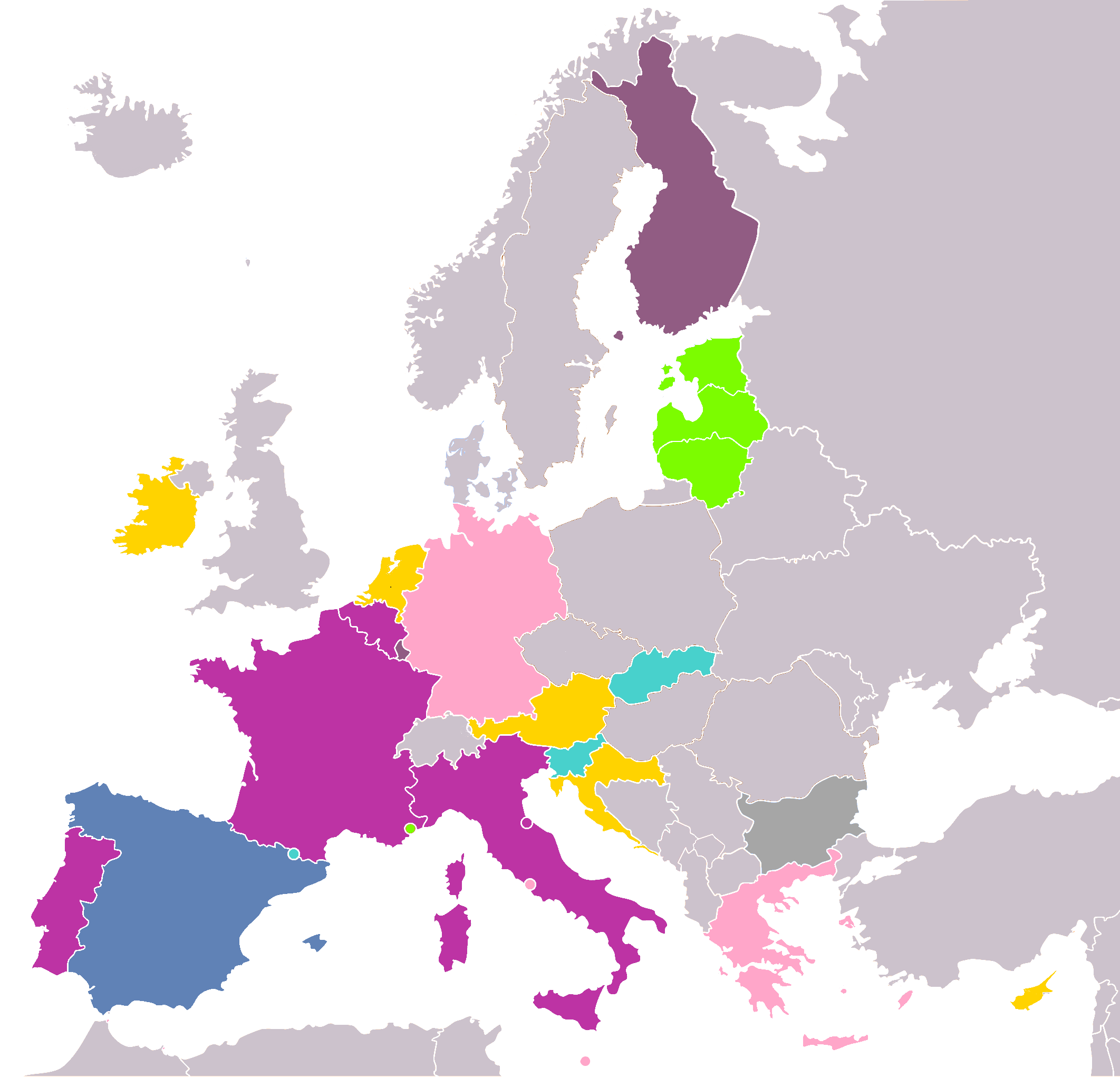
Color-coded map* of eurozone countries by number of €2 commemorative coins issued *State 1 October 2026 46 to 50 coins issued 41 to 45 coins issued 36 to 40 coins issued 31 to 35 coins issued 26 to 30 coins issued 21 to 25 coins issued 16 to 20 coins issued 11 to 15 coins issued 6 to 10 coins issued 1 to 5 coins issued no coins issued not part of the eurozone

== Issues ==
Common €2 commemorative coins issued 2010-2019 by all eurozone member states:

- European Union: 10 years of Euro Coins and Banknotes in 2012.
- European Union: 30 years of the Flag of Europe in 2015.

Three joint issues:

- Germany France: 50th anniversary of the signing of the Élysée Treaty (2013) – two coins.
- Estonia Latvia Lithuania: The 100th anniversary of the foundation of the independent Baltic states (2018) – three coins.
- Germany France: 30 years since the fall of the Berlin Wall (2019) – two coins.

Coins series with a specific theme (2010-2019):

- Latvia: Latvian Historical Regions (2016–2025) – one coin for each of the five Historical Latvian Lands.
- Lithuania:
  - Lithuanian Ethnographical Regions (2019–2025) – one coin for each of the five ethnographic regions of Lithuania.
- Malta:
  - Maltese constitutional history (2011–2015) – one coin per year representing events of the constitutional history of Malta.
  - Maltese Prehistoric Sites (2016–2022) – one coin per year representing the Megalithic Temples of Malta and the Ħal Saflieni Hypogeum.
  - From Children in Solidarity (2016–2020) – one coin per year about the solidarity, with children's designs.
- Spain: Spanish UNESCO World Heritage Sites (2010–future) – one coin per year representing Spain's UNESCO World Heritage Sites.

Country	Issues	2010	2011	2012		2013	2014	2015		2016	2017	2018	2019
Country	Issues	2010	2011	reg.	10Y€	2013	2014	reg.	30YF	2016	2017	2018	2019
Andorra	11						Y	Y/Y		Y/Y	Y/Y	Y/Y	Y/Y
Austria	4				Y				Y	Y		Y	
Belgium	17	Y	Y	Y	Y	Y	Y/Y	Y	Y	Y/Y	Y/Y	Y/Y	Y/Y
Bulgaria	0												
Croatia	0												
Cyprus	3				Y				Y		Y		
Estonia	8				Y				Y	Y	Y	Y/Y	Y/Y
Finland	18	Y	Y	Y	Y	Y/Y	Y/Y	Y/Y	Y	Y/Y	Y/Y	Y/Y	Y
France	19	Y	Y	Y	Y	Y/Y	Y/Y	Y/Y	Y	Y/Y	Y/Y	Y/Y	Y/Y
Germany	16	Y	Y	Y	Y	Y/Y	Y	Y/Y	Y	Y	Y	Y/Y	Y/Y
Greece	17	Y	Y		Y	Y/Y	Y/Y	Y	Y	Y/Y	Y/Y	Y/Y	Y/Y
Ireland	4				Y				Y	Y			Y
Italy	18	Y	Y	Y	Y	Y/Y	Y/Y	Y/Y	Y	Y/Y	Y/Y	Y/Y	Y
Latvia	11					Y	Y/Y	Y	Y/Y	Y/Y	Y/Y	Y	
Lithuania	6							Y	Y	Y	Y	Y/Y	Y/Y
Luxembourg	18	Y	Y	Y/Y	Y	Y	Y/Y	Y/Y	Y	Y	Y/Y	Y/Y	Y/Y
Malta	17		Y	Y	Y	Y	Y/Y	Y/Y	Y	Y/Y	Y/Y	Y/Y	Y/Y
Monaco	8		Y	Y		Y		Y		Y	Y	Y	Y
Netherlands	6		Y		Y	Y/Y	Y		Y				
Portugal	18	Y	Y	Y	Y	Y	Y/Y	Y/Y	Y	Y/Y	Y/Y	Y/Y	Y/Y
San Marino	16	Y	Y	Y		Y	Y/Y	Y/Y		Y/Y	Y/Y	Y/Y	Y/Y
Slovakia	10		Y		Y	Y	Y	Y	Y	Y	Y	Y	Y
Slovenia	11	Y	Y		Y	Y	Y	Y	Y	Y	Y	Y	Y
Spain	14	Y	Y	Y	Y	Y	Y/Y	Y	Y	Y	Y	Y/Y	Y
Vatican City	15	Y	Y	Y		Y/Y	Y	Y		Y/Y	Y/Y	Y/Y	Y/Y
Total	287	12	16	13	17	23	27	28	19	32	32	36	32
Y – yes / was either not yet part of the eurozone or authorized to mint euro coins (Andorra since 1 April 2012); no / S – scheduled

Issued designs are made public in the Official Journal of the European Union. Although the volume and issue date of the coins are listed in the official journal, the actual figures sometimes deviate considerably from those published.

=== 2010 coinage ===
Image	Country	Feature	Volume	Date
	Luxembourg	Arms of the Grand Duke	529,500 coins	14 January 2010
The inner part of the coin depicts, on the left, a portrait of Grand Duke Henri facing towards the right, and on the right, the Coat of Arms of the Grand Duke, above which the year of minting '2010' is featured between Mint marks, overlapping slightly into the outer ring. Below, the name of the issuing country 'LËTZEBUERG' overlaps slightly into the outer ring. The coin's outer ring depicts the 12 stars of the European flag.
	Germany	City Hall and Roland (Bremen); Fifth of the Bundesländer I series	30 million coins	29 January 2010
The inner part of the coin features Bremen town hall, with the Bremen Roland statue in the foreground. The word 'BREMEN' is inscribed below the town hall on the right. The mint mark, represented by the letter A, D, F, G or J, appears at the top left. The initials of the artist, Bodo Broschat, are at the very bottom, just below the statue. The name of the issuing country, 'D', and the year, '2010', are inserted at the top and bottom of the outer ring of the coin respectively, amid the twelve stars of the European flag.
	Spain	Historic Centre of Córdoba; First of the UNESCO World Heritage Sites series	4 million coins	February 2010
The inner part of the coin depicts the interior of the Mosque-Cathedral of Córdoba. On the left, the Mint mark. Below, the name of the issuing country followed by the year of issue 'ESPAÑA 2010'. The coin's outer ring contains the 12 stars of the European flag.
	Slovenia	200th anniversary of the Botanical Garden of Ljubljana	1 million coins	10 May 2010
The inner part of the coin depicts the Rebrinčevolistna Hladnikija plant. On the left under the plant, its name 'HLADNIKIA PASTINACIFOLIA' is written in an arc. Around the image in a circle is the legend 'SLOVENIJA 2010. 200 LET. BOTANIČNI VRT. LJUBLJANA.' The outer ring of the coin depicts the 12 stars of the European flag.
	Italy	200th birthday of Camillo Benso, conte di Cavour	4 million coins	March 2010
The inner part of the coin shows in the centre a detail of the portrait of the Italian statesman. On the left 'CAVOUR' and the monogram of the Italian Republic 'RI'. On the right 'R', the dates '1810' and '2010' and the initials of the artist Claudia Momoni 'C.M.'. The outer ring depicts the twelve stars of the European flag.
	Belgium	Belgian Presidency of the Council of the European Union	5 million coins	June 2010
The inner part of the coin features the commemorative logo, that is, the stylised letters 'EU' and 'trio.be'. Above the design is the inscription 'BELGIAN PRESIDENCY OF THE COUNCIL OF THE EU 2010' and, below it, the trilingual indication 'BELGIE BELGIQUE BELGIEN'. Underneath the logo, the mint mark is displayed to the left of the year 2010 and the mint master's mark to the right. The coin's outer ring depicts the 12 stars of the European flag.
	France	Appeal of 18 June	20 million coins	June 2010
The inner part of the coin shows General de Gaulle, in uniform, bareheaded, at a microphone typical of the time, reading the Call, in which the name of the country 'RF' is cleverly inserted. At the top is the year of issue '2010', and below it '70 ANS' (70 YEARS) and 'APPEL 18 JUIN' (CALL 18 JUNE). The coin's outer ring depicts the 12 stars of the European flag.
	Portugal	Centenary of the Portuguese Republic	2,035,000 coins	September 2010
The inner part of the coin depicts, in the centre, the Portuguese coat of arms and the 'República' effigy, two of the most representative symbols of the Portuguese Republic, surrounded by the legend 'República Portuguesa — 1910–2010', the mintmark 'INCM' and the name of the author 'JOSE CÂNDIDO'. The outer ring of the coin depicts the 12 stars of the European flag.
	San Marino	500th anniversary of the death of Sandro Botticelli	130,000 coins	7 September 2010
The inner part of the coin depicts Pleasure, a detail of one of the three dancing Graces, freely inspired by the painting 'La Primavera' of Sandro Botticelli. On the top the year '2010'. On the left the name of the issuing country 'SAN MARINO' and the mint mark 'R' and on the right the initial 'm' of the author Roberto Mauri. The coin's outer ring depicts the 12 stars of the European flag.
	Vatican City	Year for Priests	115,000 coins	12 October 2010
The inner part of the coin features a shepherd drawing a lamb from a lion's maw. Two inscriptions are engraved around the design: the issuing country 'CITTA' DEL VATICANO' on the top and the subject of commemoration 'ANNO SACERDOTALE' below it. The year '2010' is desplayed to the left of the design, the mintmark 'R' at the bottom and the artist's name 'VEROI' to the right. The coin's outer ring depicts the 12 stars of the European flag.
	Finland	Currency Decree of 1860 granting Finland the right to issue banknotes and coins	1.6 million coins	October 2010
The design shows on the left side a stylised lion figure from the coat of arms of Finland and the year '2010'. On the right side, the mintmark and a set of numbers symbolising coin values. At the bottom, the indication of the issuing country reference 'FI'. The coin's outer ring depicts the 12 stars of the European flag.
	Greece	25th Centenary of the Battle of Marathon	2.5 million coins	October 2010
The inner part of the coin shows a synthesis of a shield and a runner/warrior symbolising the battle for freedom and the noble ideals derived from the battle of Marathon. The bird on the shield symbolises the birth of western civilization at his present form. Around the image it is written in Greek 'ΜΑΡΑΘΩΝΑΣ/2500 ΧΡΟΝΙΑ/490 Π.Χ./2010 Μ.Χ.' and the issuing country 'ΕΛΛΗΝΙΚΗ ΔΗΜΟΚΡΑΤΙΑ'. The coin's outer ring depicts the 12 stars of the European flag.

=== 2011 coinage ===
Image	Country	Feature	Volume	Date
	Slovakia	20th anniversary of Foundation of the Visegrád Group	1 million coins	10 January 2011
The inner part of the coin depicts a map of the four countries that comprise the Visegrad Group: the Republic of Poland, the Czech Republic, the Slovak Republic, and the Republic of Hungary. The map is supplemented by a stylized abbreviation 'V IV'. The name of the issuing country, 'SLOVENSKO', is located in the lower right part and the year '2011' is in the lower left part of the coin field. The design is surrounded by the legend 'VYŠEHRADSKÁ SKUPINA • VISEGRAD GROUP' and the date of the Visegrad Group foundation '15.2.1991'. The initials of the author of the coin's design, Miroslav Rónai 'MR', and the mark of the Kremnica Mint, 'MK', appear under the name of the country. The coin's outer ring depicts the 12 stars of the European Union flag.
	Netherlands	500th anniversary of the Publication of The Praise of Folly by Desiderius Erasmus	4 million coins	24 January 2011
The inner part of the coin depicts Erasmus writing his book and the effigy of Queen Beatrix. Between these two images, the inscription 'Beatrix Koningin der Nederlanden' vertically positioned, the year '2011', the Mint master mark and the mintmark. The coin's outer ring depicts the 12 stars of the European Union flag.
	Germany	Cologne Cathedral (North Rhine-Westphalia); Sixth of the Bundesländer I series	30 million coins	28 January 2011
The design shows the Köln cathedral in its entirety, as a masterpiece of the Gothic architecture, emphasizing the beauty of the south portal. The name NORDRHEIN-WESTFALEN, just below the building, links the pictured building with the state. The mint mark, represented by the letter A, D, F, G or J, is located in the right upper core region, the initials of the artist, Heinz Hoyer, in the right central core area. The coin's outer ring depicts the 12 stars of the European Union flag. Between the stars, at the bottom, the year '2011' and at the top the indication of the issuing country reference 'D'.
	Luxembourg	50th anniversary of the Appointment of Jean, Grand Duke of Luxembourg by his mother Charlotte, Grand Duchess of Luxembourg as lieutenant-représentent	729,500 coins	3 February 2011
The coin depicts on the right hand of its inner part the effigy of His Royal Highness, the Grand-Duke Henri, looking to the left, and superimposed on the effigies of the Grand-Duke Jean and the Grand-Duchess Charlotte. The text 'LËTZEBUERG' is depicted above the three effigies. The year-date '2011', flanked by the mintmark and the Mintmaster mark, appears above. The name of the Royal Highness is depicted below the respective effigy. The coin's outer ring depicts the 12 stars of the European flag.
	Spain	Patio de los Leones of the Alhambra, Generalife and Albayzín, Granada; Second of the UNESCO World Heritage Sites series	4 million coins	March 2011
The design shows an image of the Patio de los Leones in the Alhambra in Granada. At the bottom the name of the issuing country 'ESPAÑA' and the year-date '2011' and at the top, the mintmark. The coin's outer ring depicts the 12 stars of the European flag.
	Slovenia	100th birthday of Franc Rozman – Stane	1 million coins	March 2011
The design shows on the left side the image of Franc Rozman-Stane with five-armed star in his lower part. The legend 'SLOVENIJA' separates upper and lower part of the right side of the coin. Under the legend the year '2011' is written vertically. On the upper side, vertically one under the other are legends 'FRANC', 'ROZMAN', 'STANE' and horizontally the years '1911' and '1944'. The coin's outer ring depicts the 12 stars of the European Union flag.
	Belgium	1st Centenary of the International Women's Day	5 million coins	March 2011
The obverse of the coin displays the effigy of Isala Van Diest, the first Belgian woman doctor, and Marie Popelin, the first Belgian woman lawyer. The names are written under the effigies and around the year '2011', and are crowned with the symbol of the corresponding profession. Above the effigies, to the left and right respectively of the indication of the issuing country, 'BE', the mark of the mint master and the mint mark are shown. The coin's outer ring depicts the 12 stars of the European flag.
	Italy	150th anniversary of Italian unification	10 million coins	March 2011
The inner part of the coin shows, at the centre, three Italian flags in the wind, representing the three past 50th anniversaries — 1911, 1961 and 2011 — which illustrate a perfect link between generations: this is the logo of the 150th anniversary of the unification of Italy. At the top, the inscription '150o DELL'UNITA' D'ITALIA' (150th anniversary of the unification of Italy); at the right, the initials of the issuing country 'RI' (Republic of Italy); at the bottom, the dates '1861 › 2011 › ›'; under the dates, at the centre, the mintmark 'R' and at the right, the initials of the artist Ettore Lorenzo Frapiccini and the first three letters of the Italian name of his profession (incisore) 'ELF INC.' The coin's outer ring depicts the 12 stars of the European flag.
	France	30th anniversary of Fête de la Musique	10,014,404 coins	21 June 2011
The inner part of the coin depicts a cheerful crowd, with a stylised image of a musical instrument and notes floating in the air, denoting the atmosphere of celebration on the Day of Music, which has been celebrated in France every summer solstice since 1981. The words 'Fête de la MUSIQUE' and the date '21 JUIN 2011' appear at the centre of the drawing. On top, slanting rightwards, are the words '30e ANNIVERSAIRE', and the country indication 'RF' appears at the bottom. The coin's outer ring depicts the 12 stars of the European flag.
	Greece	2011 Special Olympics World Summer Games	1 million coins	June 2011
The centre of the coin shows the emblem of the Games, a radiant sun, the source of life that underlines the excellence and power of the athlete that takes part in the Games. Excellence is depicted in the olive branch and power in the spiral form in the centre of the sun. Around the image is written the sign 'XIII Special Olympics W.S.G. Athens 2011' as well as the issuing country 'Ελληνικη Δημοκρατια'. The mintmark is also depicted in between. The coin's outer ring depicts the 12 stars of the European flag.
	San Marino	500th birthday of Giorgio Vasari	130,000 coins	June 2011
The inner part of the coin shows a detail from the painting 'Judith and Holofernes' by Giorgio Vasari. At the bottom are the dates '1511–2011', with 'G. Vasari' and the mint mark 'R' on the left. On the right are the inscriptions 'San Marino' and 'C.M.', the initials of the mint maker Claudia Momoni. The coin's outer ring depicts the 12 stars of the European flag.
	Monaco	Wedding of Prince Albert and Charlene Wittstock	147,877 coins	2 July 2011
The inner part of the coin shows, at the centre, the effigies of Prince Albert and Charlene. At the bottom, the name of the issuing country 'MONACO' and the year of issuance '2011'. The mint mark and the mint engravers mark appear before and after 'MONACO 2011', respectively. The coin's outer ring depicts the 12 stars of the European flag.
	Portugal	500th birthday of Fernão Mendes Pinto	520,000 coins	15 September 2011
The inner part of the coin depicts a sailing ship on several wave-shaped inscriptions referring to Portugal, Lisbon, his book and some of his travel destinations. The inscription 'Portugal' appears underneath. His name combined with the years 1511 and 2011 appear on top of the inner part. The coin's outer ring depicts the 12 stars of the European flag.
	Finland	200th anniversary of the Bank of Finland	1.5 million coins	October 2011
The centre of the coin shows the Finnish national bird, whooper swan. The swan's wing separates the years '1811' (bottom right) and '2011' (centre left). The letter 'V' in the left armpit of the swan stands for the surname of the designer, Hannu Veijalainen. At the bottom of the inner ring, the indication of the issuing country 'FI' and the mintmark appear. The coin's outer ring depicts the 12 stars of the European flag.
	Malta	First election of representatives in 1849; First of the Maltese constitutional history series	430,000 coins	October 2011
The centre of the coin shows a hand putting a vote into a ballot box. At the bottom, the year '2011'. At the top, extending to the right along the inner ring, the words 'Malta — First elected representatives 1849'. The coin's outer ring depicts the 12 stars of the European flag.
	Vatican City	26th World Youth Day	115,000 coins	October 2011
The inner part of the coin shows, at the centre, some young people and flags, and also the mintmark 'R' and the year '2011'. At the top, along the outer limit of the inner ring, from left to right, 'XXVI' and 'G.M.G' from Giornata Mondiale della Gioventù (World Youth Day). At the bottom, the name of the issuing country 'CITTÀ DEL VATICANO'. The coin's outer ring depicts the 12 stars of the European flag.

=== 2012 coinage ===
Image	Country	Feature	Volume	Date
	Germany	Neuschwanstein Castle near Füssen (Bavaria); Seventh of the Bundesländer I series	30 million coins	3 February 2012
The commemorative 'Bavaria' was designed by Erich Ott and shows the most famous view of Neuschwanstein Castle. The design shows the view from the east as visitors see it during their ascent to the castle, with the gatehouse in the foreground and the medieval-style towers and turrets. The panoramic mountain situated behind the castle is well captured, as the site of the castle on a cliff overlooking the romantic Pöllatschlucht. The name 'BAYERN' links the depicted construction 'Neuschwanstein Castle' with the state. The mintmark of the respective mint (A, D, F, G or J) is located in the right central core area and the initials of the artist in the left central core area. The coin's outer ring depicts the 12 stars of the European Union flag. Between the stars, at the bottom, the year '2012' and at the top the indication of the issuing country 'D'.
	Luxembourg	100 years since the death of William IV, Grand Duke of Luxembourg	722,500 coins	9 February 2012
The coin depicts on the left hand of its inner part the effigy of His Royal Highness, the Grand-Duke Henri, looking to the right, and superimposed on the effigy of the Grand-Duke Guillaume IV, looking to the right. The text 'GRANDS-DUCS DE LUXEMBOURG' and the year-date '2012', flanked by the mintmark and the initials of the Mintmaster, appear above the effigies on the inner part of the coin. In front of the effigies, the outline of the city of Luxembourg appears as background. The names 'HENRI' and 'GUILLAUME IV' as well as the text '† 1912' are depicted below their respective effigies. The coin's outer ring depicts the 12 stars of the European flag.
	Spain	Burgos Cathedral; Third of the UNESCO World Heritage Sites series	8 million coins	1 March 2012
The coin portrays a Burgos Cathedral view. The name of the issuing country 'ESPAÑA' appears at the upper left hand side. On the right hand side the year '2012' and the mintmark. The coin's outer ring depicts the 12 stars of the European flag.
	Belgium	75th anniversary of the Queen Elisabeth Music Competition	5 million coins	6 June 2012
The inner part of the coin depicts the emblem of the Queen Elisabeth Competition superimposed on the effigy of Queen Elisabeth, looking to the left, flanked on the left and right respectively by the mark of the mint master and the mark of the Brussels mint, a helmeted profile of the Archangel Michael. The years 1937–2012 are inscribed above the effigy, and the words 'QUEEN ELISABETH COMPETITION' below it. The nationality 'BE' is indicated to the right of the portrait of the Queen. The coin's outer ring depicts the 12 stars of the European flag.
	San Marino	10th anniversary of euro coins and banknotes	130,000 coins	19 June 2012
The euro sign in the centre of the coin shows that the euro has become an element of particular importance in Europe as well all over the world as the euro evolved to a global player in the international monetary system in the last 10 years. The design elements around the euro symbol on the coin express the importance of the euro to the people, to the financial world (ECB tower), to trading (ships), to industry (factories), to the energy sector and to research and development (wind power stations). The initials 'AH' of the artist appear under the image of the ECB tower. The name of the issuing country 'SAN MARINO' appears at the top, the mintmark at the right-hand side, while the indication 2002–2012 appears at the bottom. The coin's outer ring depicts the 12 stars of the European flag. Note: Although the design is the same as the 2012 common issue, the coin is issued as national coinage since common side issues are restricted to EU member states.
	Portugal	Guimarães, European Capital of Culture 2012	520,000 coins	21 June 2012
The coins depicts three of Guimarães most relevant symbols: King Afonso Henriques and his sword and a part of the city castle. On the left, the Portuguese Coat of Arms and the indication of the issuing country: Portugal. On the bottom right is the Guimarães 2012 event logo and the artist name: José de Guimarães. The coin's outer ring depicts the 12 stars of the European flag.
	France	100th birthday of Abbé Pierre	1 million coins	24 June 2012
The coin depicts a portrait of the Abbé Pierre, with its béret, and the logo of its foundation, with a microtext mentioning 'Et les autres?' which was its favorite motto to recall that one should never forget to help the others. The letters 'RF' do appear for 'République française' together with the horn of plenty, mintmark of Monnaie de Paris on the left side, and the 'fleurette', hallmark of the engraving workshop on the right side. The coin's outer ring depicts the 12 stars of the European flag.
	Monaco	500th anniversary of the foundation of Monaco's sovereignty	110,000 coins	1 July 2012
The inner part of the coin shows a portrait of Lucien 1er GRIMALDI in profile facing to the left. The words 'SOUVERAINETE DE MONACO' appear above the portrait in an arc along the upper edge of the inner part of the coin, flanked by the years '1512' and '2012'. Two ornamental details are engraved at the beginning and at the end of the text. At the bottom, the horn of plenty, mintmark of the 'Monnaie de Paris', and the 'fleurette', hallmark of the engraving workshop, flank the portrait on the left hand side and the right hand side, respectively. Above the mintmark is engraved the inscription 'Lucien Ier'. The coin's outer ring depicts the 12 stars of the European flag.
	Italy	100 years since the death of Giovanni Pascoli	15 million coins	18 July 2012
In the foreground, a portrait of the poet from Romagna, Giovanni PASCOLI, a representative figure of the Italian literature of the late 19th century. On the right, the year of issue '2012' and the monogram of the Italian Republic 'RI'; on the left, the year of the death '1912'; the mintmark 'R' and the initials of the author Maria Carmela Colaneri 'MCC'. At the bottom, the arch-shaped inscription 'G. PASCOLI'. The coin's outer ring depicts the 12 stars of the European flag.
	Malta	Majority Representation in 1887; Second of the Maltese constitutional history series	455,000 coins	20 August 2012
The design was created by the Maltese artist Gianni Bonnici and it shows a jubilant crowd with the Governor's Palace, in Valletta, depicted in the background. At the top of the inner ring, in a semicircle, the inscription 'MALTA — Majority representation 1887'. At the bottom the year '2012'. The coin's outer ring depicts the 12 stars of the European flag.
	Finland	150 years Helene Schjerfbeck	2 million coins	5 October 2012
The design shows a stylised self portrait of the artist with the text Helene SCHJERFBECK on the left and the yearmarks 1862–1946 on the right. Left on the lower side of the coin are the yearmark 2012 and the country's reference FI. The coin's outer ring depicts the 12 stars of the European flag.
	Vatican City	7th World Meeting of Families	115,000 coins	16 October 2012
The inner ring features a family with the Cathedral of Milan. The inscription 'VII INCONTRO MONDIALE DELLE FAMIGLIE' surrounds the design, forming a semi-circle which is complemented at the upper right side by the name of the issuing state 'CITTÁ DEL VATICANO'. The year 2012 appears on the right side and the name of the artist 'G. TITOTTO' followed by the indication of the engraver 'LDS Inc' is displayed on the left side. The mintmark 'R' appears at the bottom of the design, between the mother and the child. The coin's outer ring depicts the 12 stars of the European flag.
	Luxembourg	Royal Wedding of Guillaume, Hereditary Grand Duke of Luxembourg to Countess Stéphanie de Lannoy	512,000 coins	19 December 2012
The coin depicts, on the left of its inner part, the effigy of His Royal Highness, the Grand-Duke Henri, and on the right of its inner part, the effigy of the Heir Grand-Duke Guillaume superimposed on the effigy of the Countess Stéphanie. The texts 'PRËNZENHOCHZAÏT' and 'LËTZEBUERG' and the year '2012', flanked by the mint mark and the initials of the mint master, appear at the bottom of the inner part of the coin. The coin's outer ring depicts the 12 stars of the European flag.

=== 2012 commonly issued coin ===
Image	Country	Feature	Volume	Date
	European Union	10th anniversary of Euro coins and banknotes	89,795,361 coins	2 January – 30 March 2012
The Euro-sign in the centre of the coin shows that the Euro has become an element of particular importance in Europe as well all over the world as the Euro evolved to a global player in the international monetary system in the last 10 years. The design elements around the Euro-symbol on the coin express the importance of the Euro to the people, to the financial world (ECB tower), to trading (ships), to industry (factories), to the energy sector and research and development (wind power stations). The initials AH of the artist appear under the image of the ECB tower. The name(s) of the issuing country in the national language(s) appear(s) at the top, while the indication 2002–2012 appears at the bottom. The outer ring depicts the 12 stars of the European flag.
	Austria	10th anniversary of Euro coins and banknotes	11 million coins	2 January 2012
Inscription: REPUBLIK ÖSTERREICH, 2002, 2012
	Estonia	10th anniversary of Euro coins and banknotes	2 million coins	2 January 2012
Inscription: EESTI, 2002, 2012
	Germany	10th anniversary of Euro coins and banknotes	30,725,000 coins	2 January 2012
Inscription: BUNDESREPUBLIK DEUTSCHLAND, 2002, 2012
	Greece	10th anniversary of Euro coins and banknotes	1 million coins	2 January 2012
Inscription: ΕΛΛΗΝΙΚΗ ΔΗΜΟΚΡΑΤΙΑ, 2002, 2012
	Slovakia	10th anniversary of Euro coins and banknotes	1 million coins	2 January 2012
Inscription: SLOVENSKO, 2002, 2012
	Spain	10th anniversary of Euro coins and banknotes	4 million coins	2 January 2012
Inscription: ESPAÑA, 2002, 2012
	Ireland	10th anniversary of Euro coins and banknotes	1,354,867 coins	3 January 2012
Inscription: ÉIRE, 2002, 2012 Note: In the inscription the country's name is in Gaelic type.
	Slovenia	10th anniversary of Euro coins and banknotes	1 million coins	3 January 2012
Inscription: SLOVENIJA, 2002, 2012
	France	10th anniversary of Euro coins and banknotes	10,010,994 coins	5 January 2012
Inscription: RÉPUBLIQUE FRANÇAISE, 2002, 2012
	Finland	10th anniversary of Euro coins and banknotes	1.5 million coins	12 January 2012
Inscription: SUOMI, FINLAND, 2002, 2012
	Belgium	10th anniversary of Euro coins and banknotes	5,022,000 coins	30 January 2012
Inscription: BE, 2002, 2012
	Luxembourg	10th anniversary of Euro coins and banknotes	532,500 coins	31 January 2012
Inscription: LËTZEBUERG, 2002, 2012 Note: In accordance with the national law, the coin shows an effigy of the Grand Duke as a latent image.
	Cyprus	10th anniversary of Euro coins and banknotes	1 million coins	13 February 2012
Inscription: KYΠPOΣ, KIBRIS, 2002, 2012
	Netherlands	10th anniversary of Euro coins and banknotes	3.5 million coins	13 February 2012
Inscription: NEDERLAND, 2002, 2012
	Portugal	10th anniversary of Euro coins and banknotes	520,000 coins	24 February 2012
Inscription: PORTUGAL, 2002, 2012
	Italy	10th anniversary of Euro coins and banknotes	15 million coins	20 March 2012
Inscription: REPUBBLICA ITALIANA, 2002, 2012
	Malta	10th anniversary of Euro coins and banknotes	500,000 coins	30 March 2012
Inscription: MALTA, 2002, 2012

=== 2013 coinage ===
Image	Country	Feature	Volume	Date
	Germany	50th anniversary of the signing of the Élysée Treaty; Joint issue with France	11 million coins	22 January 2013
The coin, which was designed by Yves Sampo of the Monnaie de Paris, Stefanie Lindner of the Berlin State Mint, Alina Hoyer (Berlin) and Sneschana Russewa-Hoyer (Berlin), depicts stylised portraits of the Élysée Treaty's signatories (the then-Chancellor of the Federal Republic of Germany Konrad Adenauer and the former President of the French Republic Charles de Gaulle), their signatures and the words '50 ANS JAHRE' with the year '2013' in the centre, the words 'TRAITÉ DE L'ÉLYSÉE' at the top and the words 'ÉLYSÉE-VERTRAG' at the bottom. The right side of the inner part also features the mint mark of the respective mint ('A', 'D', 'F', 'G' or 'J') as well as the issuing country's code 'D'. The coin's outer ring depicts the 12 stars of the European flag.
	France	50th anniversary of the signing of the Élysée Treaty; Joint issue with Germany	10,017,789 coins	22 January 2013
The coin, which was designed by Yves Sampo of the Monnaie de Paris, Stefanie Lindner of the Berlin State Mint, Alina Hoyer (Berlin) and Sneschana Russewa-Hoyer (Berlin), depicts stylised portraits of the Élysée Treaty's signatories (the then-Chancellor of the Federal Republic of Germany Konrad Adenauer and the former President of the French Republic Charles de Gaulle), their signatures and the words '50 ANS JAHRE' with the year '2013' in the centre, the words 'TRAITÉ DE L'ÉLYSÉE' at the top and the words 'ÉLYSÉE-VERTRAG' at the bottom. The right side of the inner part features the mint mark as well as the issuing country's code 'RF' and the left side features the 'fleurette', hallmark of the engraving workshop. The coin's outer ring depicts the 12 stars of the European flag.
	Germany	Maulbronn Abbey in Baden-Württemberg. Eighth of the Bundesländer I series	30 million coins	1 February 2013
The inner part of the coin depicts the Maulbronn Monastery which is home to the most perfectly preserved medieval monastery complex north of the Alps. Founded in 1147, this complex has been a UNESCO World Heritage Site since 1993. On the top, the year of issuance '2013'. At the bottom, the inscription BADEN-WÜRTTEMBERG and underneath the indication of the issuing country 'D'. The mint mark, represented by the letter A, D, F, G or J, is located at the right hand side. At the bottom left the initials of the artist. The coin's outer ring depicts the 12 stars of the European flag.
	Slovenia	800 years since the discovery of the Postojna Cave	1 million coins	4 February 2013
The central image of the coin is a stylised spiral, which at the left side of the coin begins with inscription 'POSTOJNSKA JAMA • 1213–2013 • SLOVENIJA' and ends with two stylised speleothems. The coin's outer ring depicts the 12 stars of the European flag.
	Netherlands	The announcement of the abdication of the throne by Queen Beatrix	20 million coins	7 February 2013
The design depicts on the foreground the effigy of Queen Beatrix and on the background, partly covered by the effigy of the Queen, the effigy of the Prince of Orange. The circumscription around both effigies reads: WILLEM-ALEXANDER PRINS VAN ORANJE (crown symbol) BEATRIX KONINGIN DER NEDERLANDEN (mint mark) 28 januari 2013 (mint master mark). The coin's outer ring depicts the 12 stars of the European flag.
	Spain	Monastery and Site of the Escorial, Madrid; Fourth of the UNESCO World Heritage Sites series	8 million coins	2 March 2013
The inner part of the coin depicts a view of the San Lorenzo del Escorial Monastery. On the upper side, in circular sense and with capital letters, the name of the issuing country 'ESPANA'. At the right hand side, the year of issuance '2013' and the mint mark. The coin's outer ring depicts the 12 stars of the European flag.
	Italy	200 years since the birth of Giuseppe Verdi	10 million coins	20 May 2013
The design shows the bust of Giuseppe VERDI in three quarter view facing left; on the left, superimposed letters of the Italian Republic monogram 'RI'/1813; on the right, R (monogram of the Mint of Rome)/2013; in exergue, MCC (monogram of the Author Maria Carmela COLANERI)/G. VERDI. The coin's outer ring depicts the 12 stars of the European flag.
	France	150th anniversary of the birth of Pierre de Coubertin	1,014,338 coins	3 June 2013
The inner part of the coin depicts the face of Pierre de Coubertin still young. Stylised Olympic rings form the background. They provide the framework for silhouettes symbolising the Olympic sports. At the left, the indication of the issuing country 'RF' and the year '2013'. At the top, the inscription 'PIERRE DE COUBERTIN' in semi-circle. The coin's outer ring depicts the 12 stars of the European flag.
	Vatican City	Sede vacante	125,000 coins	3 June 2013
The design features the coat of arms of the Cardinal Camerlengo and above it the symbol of the Apostolic Camera, two small crosses, the words 'CITTÀ DEL VATICANO' at the left and 'SEDE VACANTE MMXIII' at the right. The coin's outer ring depicts the 12 stars of the European flag.
	Monaco	20th anniversary of its accession to the ONU on 28 May 1993	1,249,131 coins	17 June 2013
The coin depicts a dove with an olive branch, with in the middle of the arc, on the left side the cornucopia, and on the right side the punch, as the workshop Paris Mint mark. At the top, in semi-circle, the indication of the issuing country 'MONACO' and at the bottom, in semi-circle, the inscription '1993 ADMISSION À L'ONU 2013'. The coin's outer ring depicts the 12 stars of the European flag.
	Portugal	250th anniversary of the Clérigos Tower, Porto	525,000 coins	20 June 2013
The tower is depicted as it can be seen by the people on the street when standing close to it, side by side with the typical Oporto skyline as seen from Douro River south bank. At the top, in semi-circle, the inscription '250 ANOS TORRE DOS CLÉRIGOS — 2013'. At the bottom right, the Portuguese coat of arms and underneath the indication of the issuing country 'PORTUGAL'. At the left, the mint mark and the name of the artist 'INCM — HUGO MACIEL'. The coin's outer ring depicts the 12 stars of the European flag.
	Malta	Establishment of Self-Government in 1921; Third of the Maltese constitutional history series	542,500 coins	24 June 2013
The designs shows a map of the Maltese islands and a representation of the population. At the bottom of the design, the year '2013'. At the top, in semi-circle, the words 'MALTA — Self-government 1921'. The coin's outer ring depicts the 12 stars of the European flag.
	Slovakia	1150 years from the Byzantine Advent of advent of the Mission of Constantine and Methodius to the Great Moravia	1 million coins	5 July 2013
The design depicts the Thessalonian brothers Constantine and Methodius along with the symbolic double cross stood on three hills. The cross is at the same time held as a Bishop's crozier, thereby linking together symbols of statehood and Christianity and emphasising the significance of the brothers' mission, which helped ensure the full sovereignty and legitimacy of Great Moravia — the first Slav state in central Europe. The figure of Constantine is holding a book representing education and faith, while Methodius is shown with a church symbolising faith and institutional Christianity. Along the lower edge of the inner part of the coin is the name of the issuing country 'SLOVENSKO', the year '863' and the year '2013', with a dividing mark between each. Along the upper edge of the inner part are the names 'KONŠTANTÍN' and 'METOD'. To the left of the brothers are the stylised letters 'mh', the initials of the coin's designer Miroslav Hric, and to the right is the mint mark of the Kremnica Mint, comprising the letters 'MK' placed between two dies. The coin's outer ring depicts the 12 stars of the European flag.
	Italy	700th birthday of Giovanni Boccaccio	10 million coins	25 July 2013
The design shows the head of Giovanni BOCCACCIO in three quarter view facing right, drawn from the fresco by Andrea del Castagno, around 1450 ca. (Florence, Galleria degli Uffizi); around, on the bottom, BOCCACCIO 1313 2013; on the right, superimposed letters R (monogram of the Mint of Rome)/RI (monogram of Italian Republic)/m (monogram of the Author Mauri). The coin's outer ring depicts the 12 stars of the European flag.
	Finland	150th anniversary of the Parliament of 1863 when regular parliament sessions started in Finland	1 million coins	4 September 2013
The 2-euro commemorative coin is depicted with the year 1863 and a shoot growing out of it symbolising the start of democracy and Finland's development. In semicircle, at the bottom, the name of the issuing country 'SUOMI FINLAND' with the two words separated by the mint mark, and the year '2013'. The Diet of 1863 is the start of period of illumination. In Finland, the year 1863 marked a start for genuine democracy, transparent press operations and the right to use the Finnish language. With the beginning of regular meetings of the Diet, the opportunities of Finns to influence affairs in their own country improved in an unprecedented way. The year marked the beginning of a period of illumination for Finnish democracy. The coin's outer ring depicts the 12 stars of the European flag.
	San Marino	500th anniversary of the death of Pinturicchio	115,000 coins	13 September 2013
In the foreground, the fresco 'Christ among the doctors'; in the lower part, the inscription 'SAN MARINO' in semi-circle; to the left, the letter 'R', which is the Italian mint mark; below the fresco, the name of the author 'MOMONI'; above the fresco, the inscription 'PINTURICCHIO' in semi-circle with the years '1513' and '2013' below it. The coin's outer ring depicts the 12 stars of the European flag.
	Belgium	100 years of Royal Meteorological Institute	2,010,000 coins	18 September 2013
The obverse of the coin displays in its centre the number 100 with the first zero encircling the abbreviations 'KMI' and 'IRM' and the second zero representing a sun. Isobars, raindrops and snowflakes are depicted to the left of the sun. The year '2013' is displayed in the upper rays of the sun and the nationality 'BE' is indicated in the lower rays. The mark of the mint master and the mark of the Brussels mint, a helmeted profile of the Archangel Michael, are displayed under the '1' of the number '100'. The coin's outer ring depicts the 12 stars of the European flag.
	Greece	2400th anniversary of the Founding of the Platonic Academy	754,000 coins	1 October 2013
Portrait of Plato (in profile). On the left: the words '2 400 years since the founding of Plato's Academy' and 'Hellenic Republic' in ancient Greek lettering. On the right: '2013' and the monogram of the Greek Mint. In exergue, 'ΣΤΑΜ' (monogram of the author G. Stamatopoulos). The coin's outer ring depicts the 12 stars of the European flag.
	Greece	100th anniversary of the Union of Crete with Greece	754,000 coins	1 October 2013
The inner part of the coin depicts Cretan rebels raising the Greek flag, a symbolic representation of Crete's struggle for Union with Greece. On the upper side, in circular sense and with capital letters the name of the issuing country 'Hellenic Republic' in Greek. Underneath the words: '100 years of the union of Crete with Greece' in Greek. On the right: '1913–2013' and the monogram of the Greek Mint. In exergue, 'ΣΤΑΜ' (monogram of the author G. Stamatopoulos). The coin's outer ring depicts the 12 stars of the European flag.
	Vatican City	28th World Youth Day – Rio de Janeiro	94,000 coins	15 October 2013
The design features the most known monument of Rio de Janeiro, the 'Christ of Corcovado', and some young people around the statue. At the top, in semi-circle, the inscription 'XXVIII G.M.G. CITTÀ DEL VATICANO RIO 2013'. At the right, the mintmark 'R' and the name of the artist 'P DANIELE'. The coin's outer ring depicts the 12 stars of the European flag.
	Luxembourg	National Anthem of the Grand Duchy	522,000 coins	16 October 2013
The coin depicts on the right hand of its inner part the effigy of His Royal Highness, the Grand Duke Henri, looking to the left, and on the left hand of its inner part the musical notation as well as the text of the national anthem. The text 'Ons Heemecht' appears at the top of the inner part and the name of the issuing country 'LËTZEBUERG' as well as the year-date '2013', flanked by the mint mark and the initials of the mint master, appear at the bottom of the inner part of the coin. The coin's outer ring depicts the 12 stars of the European flag.
	Finland	125th anniversary of the birth of Nobel Prize-winning author Frans Eemil Sillanpää	1.5 million coins	4 November 2013
The inner part of the coin depicts Sillanpää's portrait. At the top, in semi-circle, the words 'F. E. SILLANPÄÄ'. At the left, the year '1888' and the mint mark. At the right, the year '1964', the indication of the issuing country 'FI' and the year of issuance '2013'. This is a special coin to commemorate the grandfather of a whole nation. F. E. SILLANPÄÄ was a master of style who brought deep insights about the relationship between people and nature into Finnish literature. He was awarded the Nobel prize in 1939 based in particular on the works Meek Heritage and The Maid Silja. This masterful author gained even more national renown with his popular radio appearances and memorable Christmas columns. After the war years, the master writer evolved into the long-bearded 'Taata', the unofficial grandfather to the country. From recollections of his childhood Christmases emerged a well-loved tradition: Grandpa gathered the whole nation devoutly around their radios with his easy-going Christmas 'talks'. The coin's outer ring depicts the 12 stars of the European flag.
	Netherlands	200th anniversary of the Kingdom of the Netherlands	3.5 million coins	25 November 2013
The inner part of the design shows a continuing ribbon that starts from the outside depicting the effigy of King Willem-Alexander and continues to depict the effigies of his six predecessors: Queen Beatrix, Queen Juliana, Queen Wilhelmina, King Willem III, King Willem II and King Willem I. The effigies are surrounded by the inscription 'Willem-Alexander Koning der Nederlanden' followed by the Royal Dutch mintmark, the mint master mark, the year 2013, the initials of the designer and at the left side of the effigies the inscription '200 jaar Koninkrijk der Nederlanden'. The coin's outer ring depicts the 12 stars of the European flag.

=== 2014 coinage ===
Image	Country	Feature	Volume	Date
	Luxembourg	175th anniversary of the Luxembourg's independence	519,500 coins	6 January 2014
The coin depicts on the right hand side of its inner part the effigy of His Royal Highness, the Grand-Duke Henri, looking to the right, and on the left hand side of its inner part, vertically positioned, the years '1839' and '2014' and the name of the issuing country 'LËTZEBUERG'. The inscriptions 'ONOFHÄNGEGKEET' and '175 Joër' appear at the bottom of the inner part of the coin. The coin's outer ring depicts the 12 stars of the European flag.
	Spain	Park Güell, work of Antoni Gaudí; Fifth of the UNESCO World Heritage Sites series	8,094,000 coins	7 February 2014
The coin depicts in the foreground a lizard sculpture which is the Park Güell emblem and was designed by the architect Antoni Gaudí. As background a detail of one of the pavilions situated at the Park Güell entrance. At the top, in circular sense and in capital letters the words 'ESPAÑA' and 'PARK GÜELL — GAUDÍ'. At the left the year of issuance '2014' and at the right the mintmark. The coin's outer ring depicts the 12 stars of the European flag.
	Germany	St. Michael's Church in Hildesheim, Lower Saxony. Ninth of the Bundesländer I series	30,824,300 coins	7 February 2014
The desigh shows the Church of St. Michael in Hildesheim, Lower Saxony which has been on the Unesco World Cultural Heritage list since 1985. At the top the year of issuance '2014' and at the left the mintmark (A, D, F, G, J). At the bottom, the inscription 'NIEDERSACHSEN' and underneath the indication of the issuing country 'D'. At the top right, the initials of the engraver OE (Ott Erich). The coin's outer ring depicts the 12 stars of the European flag.
	Italy	200th anniversary of the Carabinieri	6,525,000 coins	25 March 2014
The design shows a reinterpretation of the sculpture 'Pattuglia di Carabinieri nella tormenta' made in 1973 by Antonio Berti; on the right, superimposed letters of the Italian Republic monogram 'RI'/2014; on the left, 1814; up, superimposed letters R (monogram of the Mint of Rome); in exergue, LDS (monogram of the Author Luciana De Simoni)/CARABINIERI. The coin's outer ring depicts the 12 stars of the European flag.
	Slovakia	10 years of Slovak membership in the European Union	1 million coins	1 April 2014
At the centre of the national side are the stylised letters 'EÚ', as the abbreviation of the European Union, with the coat of arms of the Slovak Republic incorporated in the foreground. On the right-hand side of the inner part of the coin, in two lines, is the date of the Slovak Republic's accession to the European Union, '1.5.2004', and immediately below it the year '2014'. Inscribed along the bottom edge of the inner part is the name of the issuing country, 'SLOVENSKO', while in a semi-circle along the upper edge is the inscription '10. VÝROČIE VSTUPU DO EURÓPSKEJ ÚNIE'. To the lower left is the mint mark of Kremnica Mint (composed of the letters 'MK' between two dies), and to the lower right are the stylised letters 'MP', the initials of the designer, Mária Poldaufová. The coin's outer ring depicts the 12 stars of the European flag.
	Portugal	40 years since the Carnation Revolution	520,000 coins	23 April 2014
The two curves represent the general shape of a carnation, the flower symbolizing the movement, which was also the origin of the revolution's name. The name of the issuing country 'PORTUGAL' and the Coat of Arms are inscribed on the top of the flower. The center of the image shows the date of the event '25 DE ABRIL' (25 April) and at the bottom is written the number of years past since the revolution '40 ANOS' (40 years) and the year of issuance '2014'. The shape of the letters and numbers is inspired on those used in posters and other political information supports 40 years ago, as a symbol of the euphoric period lived right after the event. The coin's outer ring depicts the 12 stars of the European flag.
	Belgium	100 years since the beginning of World War I	1,750,000 coins	12 May 2014
The coin's central field depicts a poppy above the years 2014–18. Below these years appears the inscription 'The Great War Centenary', under which are the signature mark of the Master of the Mint and the mark of the Brussels mint, a helmeted profile of the archangel Michael. The top of the central field features the trilingual inscription 'BELGIE — BELGIQUE — BELGIEN'. The coin's outer ring depicts the 12 stars of the European flag.
	Netherlands	King Willem-Alexander and Princess Beatrix	5,291,000 coins	22 May 2014
The inner part of the coin depicts the effigies of both the King Willem-Alexander and the former Queen Beatrix. At the left, in semi-circle, the inscription 'WILLEM-ALEXANDER KONING DER NEDERLANDEN' and at the right, in semi-circle, the inscription 'BEATRIX PRINSES DER NEDERLANDEN'. Between the two inscriptions, at the top, the crown symbol and at the bottom the mint master mark, the mint mark and in between the year of issuance '2014'. The coin's outer ring depicts the 12 stars of the European flag.
	Malta	Independence from Britain in 1964; Fourth of the Maltese constitutional history series	432,500 coins	3 June 2014 (sets); 29 October 2014 (rolls)
The coin commemorating the Malta Independence constitution of 1964 is the fourth in the series of five coins that commemorate constitutional milestones in Maltese history. By means of the 1964 constitution Malta became an independent nation for the first time after hundreds of years of foreign domination. The national side of the coin shows a detail of the bronze monument commemorating Independence which was designed by the artist Gianni Bonnici in 1989. It shows a young woman, representing Malta, carrying the Maltese flag. At the right, in semi-circle, the inscription 'MALTA — Independence 1964' and at the bottom the year of issuance '2014'. The coin's outer ring depicts the 12 stars of the European flag.
	France	70 years since D-Day	3,019,675 coins	11 June 2014
In the coin's central field the word D-DAY is written in such a way as to depict a landing craft and a tank gun barrel. The years 1944–2014 appear above the tank gun, with the inscription '70e anniversaire du débarquement' (70th anniversary of the landings) further down. The distinctive footprints left by the boots worn by American, British and Canadian troops are gradually disappearing in the sand, washed away by a wave. The words of a poem by Verlaine used as a code for the start of the landings are engraved on the wave: 'Les sanglots longs des violons de l'automne blessent mon coeur d'une langueur monotone' (the long sobs of the violins of autumn wound my heart with a monotonous languor). The coin's outer ring depicts the 12 stars of the European flag.
	Finland	100 years since the birth of Tove Jansson	1.5 million coins	16 June 2014
The inner part of the coin depicts Tove Jansson's portrait. Under the portrait the signature 'Tove Jansson' and the years '1914–2001'. At the left the indication of the issuing country 'FI'. At the right the year of issuance '2014' and the mint mark. The coin's outer ring depicts the 12 stars of the European flag.
	Italy	450 years since the birth of Galileo Galilei	6.5 million coins	17 June 2014 (sets); 21 November 2014 (rolls)
The design shows the head of Galileo Galilei from the painting of Justus Sustermans, 1636 (Florence, Galleria degli Uffizi); around, upside, GALILEO GALILEI; on the right, superimposed letters R (monogram of the Mint of Rome)/astronomic telescope/C.M. (monogram of the Author Claudia Momoni); on the left, superimposed letters of the Italian Republic monogram 'RI'; in exergue 1564–2014. The coin's outer ring depicts the 12 stars of the European flag.
	San Marino	500th anniversary since the death of Donato Bramante	114,000 coins	23 June 2014
The coin depicts Bramante's portrait, and part of Tempietto (Italian: 'small temple'), which is a small commemorative tomb built by Donato Bramante, possibly as early as 1502, in the courtyard of San Pietro in Montorio and considered a masterpiece of the High Renaissance Italian architecture. The inscription 'BRAMANTE LAZZARI DELLE PENNE DI SAN MARINO' surrounds almost completely the design. At the left and right the years '1514' and '2014', respectively. At the bottom the initials of the artist 'MCC' (Maria Carmela Colaneri) and the mint mark. The coin's outer ring depicts the 12 stars of the European flag.
	Malta	200th anniversary of the Malta Police Force	300,000 coins	16 July 2014
The coin commemorates the 200th anniversary of the Malta Police Force which was set up by means of proclamation XXII of 1814. Thus the Malta Police Force is one of the oldest in Europe. The national side of the coin depicts the badge of the Malta Police Force with the legend '200 Years Malta Police Force' and the dates 1814–2014. The coin's outer ring depicts the 12 stars of the European flag.
	Latvia	Riga, European Capital of Culture 2014	1,005,000 coins	12 August 2014
The central image of the coin shows the skyline of Riga and the historic centre of the city that has been included in the list of the UNESCO World Heritage Sites. At the top of the image, the inscription 'EIROPAS KULTURAS GALVASPILSETA' (European capital of culture) and at the bottom the name of the celebrated city and the year of issuance 'RIGA — 2014', and underneath the indication of the issuing country 'LV'. The coin's outer ring depicts the 12 stars of the European flag.
	Belgium	150 years of the Belgian Red Cross	287,500 coins	18 September 2014
The inner part of the coin features a cross with the number '150' in its centre. The vertical and horizontal bars of the cross bear the words 'Rode Kruis' and 'Croix-Rouge' respectively. The cross is surrounded by the mark of the Brussels mint (a helmeted profile of the archangel Michael), the signature mark of the Master of the Mint, the year 2014, and the country code 'BE'. The coin's outer ring depicts the 12 stars of the European flag.
	Greece	150th anniversary of the Union of the Ionian Islands with Greece	754,000 coins	24 September 2014
The inner part of the coin depicts a seven-pointed star inscribed in Greek with the words: '150 YEARS SINCE THE UNION OF THE IONIAN ISLANDS (EPTÁNISA) WITH GREECE 1864–2014', the name of the issuing country 'HELLENIC REPUBLIC' and the mint mark of the Greek State Mint. The spaces between the points of the star feature the symbols of the Ionian Islands. The entire design is encircled in a decorative stylised wave motif. The coin's outer ring depicts the 12 stars of the European flag.
	Greece	400 years since the death of El Greco	754,000 coins	24 September 2014
The inner part of the coin shows a portrait of Domenikos Theotokopoulos. The background features a typical figure from his work, illustrative of his technique. On the left: the year 2014 and the characteristic signature of the artist ('Domenikos Theotokopoulos Epoiei'). On the right: the mint mark of the Greek State Mint. The entire design is encircled in an inscription reading in Greek 'DOMENIKOS THEOTOKOPOULOS 1541–1614' and the name of the issuing country 'HELLENIC REPUBLIC'. The coin's outer ring depicts the 12 stars of the European flag.
	San Marino	90th anniversary since the death of Giacomo Puccini	100,000 coins	29 September 2014
The designs shows a portrait of the composer Giacomo Puccini. At the right the name of the issuing country, in semi-circle, 'SAN MARINO'. At the left the inscription 'G. PUCCINI' and the mint mark. At the bottom the year '2014'. The coin's outer ring depicts the 12 stars of the European flag.
	Vatican City	25 years since the Fall of the Berlin Wall	103,000 coins	14 October 2014
The design depicts some bricks of the partially collapsed Berlin Wall in the foreground, with the wording 'XXV ANNIVERSARIO DEL CROLLO DEL MURO DI BERLINO 1989 2014' (25th anniversary of the fall of the Berlin Wall 1989 2014) written within the bricks. An olive branch can be seen in the centre, in a gap between the bricks and a piece of barbed wire, and the Brandenburg Gate appears in the background. At the top, the words 'CITTA' DEL VATICANO' are inscribed. The coin's outer ring depicts the 12 stars of the European flag.
	Portugal	International Year of Family Farming	520,000 coins	31 October 2014
OOn the central part of the design are represented tools typically used in the traditional agriculture, together with farming products: a chicken in the center, surrounded by pumpkins, a basket of potatoes, and other vegetables and flowers. On the left side, in semi-circle, the subject of the commemoration 'AGRICULTURA FAMILIAR' (Family Farming) and on the right side, in semi-circle, the name of the issuing country 'PORTUGAL' followed by the year of issuance '2014'. At the bottom left the mintmark 'INCM'. The coin's outer ring depicts the 12 stars of the European flag.
	Luxembourg	50th anniversary of Grand Duke Jean accession to the throne	512,000 coins	6 November 2014
The coin's inner part depicts the effigies of Their Royal Highnesses, the Grand-Duke Henri and the Grand-Duke Jean, both looking to the left. It is surmounted by the year '1964' above the effigy of the Grand-Duke Jean and by a crown. At the bottom, the names 'Jean' and 'Henri' appear below the respective effigy as well as the year '2014'. The inscription '50e ANNIVERSAIRE DE L'ACCESSION AU TRÔNE DU GRAND-DUC JEAN' encloses in circular form the upper inner part of the coin. The coin's outer ring depicts the 12 stars of the European flag.
	Finland	100 years since the birth of Ilmari Tapiovaara	1 million coins	10 November 2014
The left inner part of the design shows Ilmari Tapiovaara's name and years. The right inner part of the design depicts a close-up from the furniture fitting characteristic for Ilmari Tapiovaara. At the right the indication of the issuing country 'FI', the mint mark and the year of issuance '2014'. The coin's outer ring depicts the 12 stars of the European flag.
	Slovenia	600th anniversary since the Coronation of Barbara of Cilli	1 million coins	17 November 2014
The central image of the coin shows, with lined pattern, the portrait of the Queen Barbara of Celje with her sceptre. On the image are placed three typical six-pointed stars of Celje counts. On the left side of the portrait is the inscription 'SLOVENIJA' and on the right side the inscription 'BARBARA CELJSKA' and the years '1414–2014'. The coin's outer ring depicts the 12 stars of the European flag.
	France	World AIDS Day	3 million coins	24 November 2014
The red ribbon, symbolising the fight against AIDS, is featured in the coin's central field. The ribbon was created by the Visual AIDS Artists Caucus and the US painter Frank Moore. It should be worn close to the heart to symbolise solidarity with AIDS sufferers and is in the shape of an upside-down V. The idea is for it to be worn as a V one day to signify victory over the disease. There are three ribbons in the central field. One is in the conventional position and will be coloured red for the brilliant uncirculated (BU) and proof (PRF) versions. The other two ribbons are inverted and associated with two Vs to strengthen the symbolism of the much-hoped-for victory over the disease. The date 1 December, Unesco World AIDS Day, appears at the top of the central field. The coin's outer ring depicts the 12 stars of the European flag.
	Spain	King Felipe VI's accession to the throne	12 million coins	10 December 2014
The design depicts the overlapping portraits of Kings Felipe VI and Juan Carlos I. At the bottom the name of the issuing country and the year of issuance: 'ESPAÑA — 2014'. At the right, the mint mark. The coin's outer ring depicts the 12 stars of the European flag.
	Andorra	20 years in the Council of Europe	105,000 coins	29 February 2016
The design shows at the centre left the coat of arms of Andorra followed by the inscription '20' where the zero is stylised to represent the Council of Europe's flag. At the top are the inscriptions 'ANDORRA' and underneath 'AL CONSELL D'EUROPA'. The year '2014' appears at the bottom left followed by an oblique line. The coin's outer ring depicts the 12 stars of the European flag.

=== 2015 coinage ===
Image	Country	Feature	Volume	Date
	Spain	Cave of Altamira and Paleolithic Cave Art of Northern Spain; Sixth of the UNESCO World Heritage Sites series	8 million coins	30 January 2015
The design depicts in the foreground the bison painting from the Cave of Altamira located in Cantabria. In the upper side of the image, in circular sense and with capital letters, the word 'ESPAÑA', at the bottom the year of issuance '2015' and at the right the mint mark. The coin's outer ring depicts the 12 stars of the European flag.
	Germany	25 years of German Unity	30.5 million coins	30 January 2015
The people in the foreground, who embody a new beginning and the advance towards a better future, are standing in front of the Brandenburg Gate, symbol of German unity. The rendering of the statement Wir sind ein Volk ('we are one people') — a collective expression of will by German citizens – represents the path forwards towards German reunification. The inner part also features the mint mark of the respective mint ('A', 'D', 'F', 'G' or 'J') as well as the issuing country's country code 'D' and the engraver's mark (the initials 'BW' — Bernd Wendhut). The coin's outer ring depicts the 12 stars of the European flag.
	France	70 years of peace in Europe	4,020,000 coins	30 January 2015
In the coin's central field is a modern graphic representation of a dove. It is carrying an olive branch, the symbol of peace, whose branches have been replaced by the 12 stars of the European flag. The 28 countries of the European Union are represented by the ISO code for each country. The letters RF (République Française) are at the bottom of the coin. The mint marks are on the left-hand side and the year 2015 on the right. The coin's outer ring depicts the 12 stars of the European flag.
	Germany	Paulskirche in Frankfurt am Main; Tenth of the Bundesländer I series	30,765,000 coins	30 January 2015
The design depicts a classic perspective on St. Paul's Church in Frankfurt (the 'Paulskirche' was the seat of Germany's first freely elected legislative body in 1849 and is regarded as the cradle of German democracy) and is therefore the perspective possessing the greatest recognition value. The design incisively brings out the tension between the dominant tower and the elliptical structure of the church. The slightly exaggerated flight of steps has an inviting quality while simultaneously offering support to the subjacent inscription 'HESSEN' (the Federal State of Hessen in which St. Paul's Church is situated). The inner part also features the year '2015' and the mint mark of the respective mint ('A', 'D', 'F', 'G' or 'J') at the left side as well as the issuing country's indication 'D' and the engraver's mark (the initials 'HH' — Heinz Hoyer) at the right side. The coin's outer ring depicts the 12 stars of the European flag.
	Latvia	EU Presidency	1,025,000 coins	10 February 2015
The design shows the official logo of the Latvian Presidency of the Council of the European Union. The logo is complemented by the lettering 'LATVIJAS PREZIDENTŪRA ES PADOMĒ' (LATVIAN PRESIDENCY OF THE COUNCIL OF THE EUROPEAN UNION) and the website of the Presidency 'EU2015.LV'. The coin's outer ring depicts the 12 stars of the European flag.
	Finland	150 years since the birth of Jean Sibelius	1 million coins	18 February 2015
At the inner part of the coin is sky with stars, tree tops at the right. The text 'JEAN SIBELIUS' and the year of issuance '2015' are placed at the left inner part of the coin. At the right is the indication of the issuing country 'FI' and the mint mark. The coin's outer ring depicts the 12 stars of the European flag.
	San Marino	750 years since the birth of Dante Alighieri	100,000 coins	8 April 2015
The design by Annalisa Masini shows a portrait of Dante, taken from a fresco by Botticelli. At the right of the portrait, the inscription 'DANTE' on a vertical axis. At the right of the inner centre, the name of the issuing country 'SAN MARINO' in semi-circle. Between these two inscriptions, the mint mark 'R', the years '1265' and '2015' and the initials of the artist 'AM'. The lettering style used in identifying the nation and the coin's subject was inspired by lettering in the first copies of the Divina Commedia (Dante's Divine Comedy). The coin's outer ring depicts the 12 stars of the European flag.
	Portugal	150 years Portuguese Red Cross	520,000 coins	15 April 2015
The design depicts a visual composition based on the well-known cross, symbol of the organisation, replicated several times to represent the expansion of the humanitarian action both in Portugal and abroad. The contour of a hand in the background symbolises the different kinds of help given by the organisation to the people, mostly medical, but also and among others: cooperating, constructing and supporting. At the left side, in semi-circle, the inscription 'CRUZ VERMELHA PORTUGUESA'. At the top, the Coat of Arms and the name of the issuing country 'PORTUGAL' and at the bottom the years '1865' and '2015'. The coin's outer ring depicts the 12 stars of the European flag.
	Italy	Universal Exposition Expo 2015 in Milan	3,525,000 coins	29 April 2015 (proof); 22 July 2015 (rolls)
The design depicts a composition symbolising the fertility of Earth: on a semicircle indicating the terrestrial sphere, a seed fed by the water waits to sprout; above the Earth, a vine, an olive twig and an ear grow from a tree trunk; around, the inscription 'NUTRIRE IL PIANETA'; on the left the initials of the designer Maria Grazia Urbani, 'MGU'; on the right, the monogram of Italian Republic 'RI' and 'R', identifying the Mint of Rome; in the middle, logo of the EXPO MILANO 2015. The coin's outer ring depicts the 12 stars of the European flag.
	Malta	100 years since the first flight from Malta	325,000 coins	25 May 2015
The coin commemorates an important milestone in Maltese aviation history — the 100 years since the first flight from Malta. It was on 13 February 1915 that Captain Kilmer took off from the Grand Harbour on a seaplane that was carried by HMS Ark Royal. The plane landed in the harbour after a 55-minute flight. The coin depicts Captain Kilmer's seaplane with Senglea Point, a prominent feature in the Grand Harbour, in the background. At the top the inscription 'FIRST FLIGHT FROM MALTA' in semi-circle. At the right the years '1915–2015'. At the bottom left the inscription '100TH ANNIVERSARY' and at the bottom the initials of the designer 'NGB' (Noel Galea Bason). The coin's outer ring depicts the 12 stars of the European flag.
	Luxembourg	15th anniversary of Grand Duke Henri accession to the throne	517,500 coins	8 June 2015
The coin depicts their Royal Highnesses Grand Duke Henri and the Grand Duchess. The year of accession '2000', the issuing country 'Luxembourg' and the year mark '2015' appear above them. Below them appears the inscription '15e anniversaire de l'accession au trône de S.A.R. le Grand-Duc' (15th anniversary of the accession to the throne of H.R.H. the Grand Duke). The coin's outer ring depicts the 12 stars of the European flag.
	Malta	Proclamation of the Republic of Malta in 1974; Fifth of the Maltese constitutional history series	435,000 coins	23 June 2015 (sets); 3 October 2015 (rolls)
The coin is the last in a series of five commemorating Maltese constitutional milestones. Malta was declared a republic on 13 December 1974 following constitutional changes which were agreed upon by a great majority in Malta's Parliament. The design reproduces a marble tablet affixed to the façade of the Presidential Palace in Valletta to mark Malta's change from a monarchy to a republic. At the top right, in semi-circle, the inscription 'MALTA — Republic 1974'. At the bottom, the year '2015'. The coin's outer ring depicts the 12 stars of the European flag.
	Italy	750 years since the birth of Dante Alighieri	3,515,000 coins	26 June 2015 (sets); 22 July 2015 (rolls)
The design shows Dante with an open book in his left hand and the Purgatory mountain at the back: detail from the illustration of the Divine Comedy painted by Domenico di Michelino (1417–1491) in the Dome of S. Maria del Fiore in Florence; in the centre, the monogram of the Italian Republic 'RI'; at the right the inscription 'R', identifying the Mint of Rome; below the inscription 'SP', initials of Silvia Petrassi and the dates '1265 2015', i.e. the year of the anniversary and that of the coin's issue respectively; arch shaped, the inscription 'DANTE ALIGHIERI'. The coin's outer ring depicts the 12 stars of the European flag.
	Portugal	500 years since first Contact with Timor	520,000 coins	15 July 2015
The design depicts a 16th-century ship, representing the arrival of the Portuguese navigators to the island, and a local house thatched roof top, including the typical wood sculptures, permanent memories of myths and legends. The one depicted on the coin represents the history of the first inhabitants, who arrived by boat from other parts of the Asian continent and the importance of the horse to travel around the steep mountains which cover most of the island. At the top right, the year '1515' and the name of the issuing country 'PORTUGAL'. At the bottom left, the inscription 'TIMOR' and the year '2015'. At the bottom, the signature of the artist Fernando Fonseca. The coin's outer ring depicts the 12 stars of the European flag.
	France	225. anniversary of Fête de la Fédération	4,020,000 coins	22 July 2015
The French national holiday brings the people of France together in celebration of the Republic. The design shows Marianne, the symbol of the Republic, depicted in profile in a graphic, contemporary style. She is wearing the Phrygian cap. On the right the tricolour cockade appears in outline above the letters RF. The year is written in the centre of the coin. The left side features a stanza from the poem 'Liberté' by the French poet Paul Eluard, an allusion to the motto of the French Republic. The mint marks appear alongside this extract. The coin's outer ring depicts the 12 stars of the European flag.
	Belgium	European Year for Development	250,000 coins	17 September 2015
The inner part of the coin depicts a hand holding a globe of the Earth with a plant in the foreground. The inscription '2015 EUROPEAN YEAR FOR DEVELOPMENT' features in an arc above the globe. The country code 'BE' appears beneath the hand while the signature mark of the Master of the Mint and the mark of the Brussels mint, a helmeted profile of the archangel Michael, are to its left. The coin's outer ring depicts the 12 stars of the European flag.
	San Marino	25 years of German Unity	100,000 coins	29 September 2015
The design shows the Brandenburg Gate which during the Cold War was located in East Berlin, in two representations which are intertwined like two hands, symbolizing the reunification of the two parts of Berlin. At the left the mint mark "R" and the initials of the artist "ES" (Erik Spiekermann). In circle around the design are the inscription "25° ANNIVERSARIO DELLA RIUNIFICAZIONE DELLA GERMANIA 1990–2015" (25th anniversary of the German reunification) and the country and year of issuance "San Marino MMXV". The coin's outer ring depicts the 12 stars of the European flag.
	Vatican City	VIII World Meeting of Families – Philadelphia 2015	122,000 coins	6 October 2015
The design depicts two families which ideally embrace the whole Earth. At the top, the year of issuance '2015'. At the left side, the name of the artist 'C. Principe'. The mint mark R appears on the arm of one family member at the right. The design is surrounded by the inscription 'VIII INCONTRO MONDIALE DELLE FAMIGLIE' (The VIII World Meeting of Families), from the left to the right in semi-circle and 'CITTA' DEL VATICANO' at the bottom. The coin's outer ring depicts the 12 stars of the European flag.
	Luxembourg	125th anniversary of the Nassau-Weilburg Dynasty	511,500 coins	15 October 2015
On the left of the coin is the effigy of His Royal Highness Grand Duke Henri, and on the right, in a circular arrangement, and in chronological order of their accession to the throne, the portraits of their Royal Highnesses Grand Dukes Adolphe and Guillaume IV, Grand Duchesses Marie-Adélaïde and Charlotte, and Grand Duke Jean. To the right, also in circular format, is the inscription '1890 – Dynastie Nassau-Weilbourg'. The name of the issuing country, 'Luxembourg', and the year, '2015', run vertically in the centre of the design. The coin's outer ring depicts the 12 stars of the European flag.
	Finland	150 years since the birth of Akseli Gallen-Kallela	500,000 coins	22 October 2015
On the top of the design there is a swimming swan of Tuonela. The water below the swan is waving from the descending spirit. The indication of the issuing country 'FI' is at the right end of the horizon line. At the bottom of the design there is the artist's palette with Gallen-Kallela's year of birth '1865' and the year of issuance '2015'. Next to the pallet is the mint mark. The artist's name 'AKSELI GALLEN KALLELA' is on the ring of the coin, below the horizon line. The coin's outer ring depicts the 12 stars of the European flag.
	Slovakia	200 years since the birth of Ľudovít Štúr	1 million coins	23 October 2015
The design depicts a portrait of Ľudovít Štúr. Inscribed to the right of the portrait, parallel to the edge of the inner part of the coin, are the year of issuance '2015' and, further right along the edge, the name of issuing country 'SLOVENSKO'. Inscribed to the left of the portrait, parallel to the inner edge, are the dates of Štúr's birth and death '1815–1856' and, further left along the edge, the name 'ĽUDOVÍT ŠTÚR'. In the upper right part of the design is the mint mark of the Kremnica Mint (Mincovňa Kremnica), consisting of the initials 'MK' placed between two dies. In the lower right part are the stylised letters 'IŘ', the initials of the designer, Ivan Řehák. The coin's outer ring depicts the 12 stars of the European flag.
	Slovenia	2000th anniversary of the Founding of Emona	1 million coins	9 November 2015
The central image of the coin is the composition of letters that form the word 'EMONA' or 'AEMONA' and a stylised design of Emona. At the bottom, in circular sense, the inscription 'EMONA LJUBLJANA SLOVENIJA 2015'. The coin's outer ring depicts the 12 stars of the European flag.
	Monaco	800th anniversary of the Construction of the first Fortress on the Rock 1215	10,000 coins	14 November 2015
The design shows a tower on the top of the rock. At the top the name of the issuing country 'MONACO' flanked by the Paris mint mark and the mint master mark. At the bottom, the inscription 'FONDATION DE LA FORTERESSE' (Foundation of the fortress), flanked by the years '1215' and '2015'. The coin's outer ring depicts the 12 stars of the European flag.
	Latvia	Stork	1,020,000 coins	1 December 2015
The design shows a black stork (Ciconia nigra) which is considered to be one of the nature conservation flagship species in Europe. In 2005 the Black Stork Protection Plan was adopted in Latvia. At the bottom of the design is the name of the issuing country 'LATVIJA' and underneath the year of issuance '2015'. The coin's outer ring depicts the 12 stars of the European flag.
	Lithuania	Lithuanian Language	1 million coins	14 December 2015
The design shows the word 'AČIŪ'(THANK YOU) — one of the most beautiful words in the Lithuanian language. An original Lithuanian font — created specially on the basis of the Latin font for the occasion of the centenary of the restoration of Lithuanian press — in order to match better the combinations of letters used most in the Lithuanian language, is used in the project. All the letters of the Lithuanian language are depicted on the background of the word 'AČIŪ', laid out in a tag cloud. At the bottom is the name of the issuing country 'LIETUVA' and underneath the name is the year '2015'. At the bottom right, under the word 'AČIŪ' is the mint mark of the Lithuanian Mint. The coin's outer ring depicts the 12 stars of the European flag.
	Greece	75 years since the death of Spyridon Louis	750,000 coins	15 December 2015
The design shows Spyros Louis and the cup that he was awarded, against the background with the Panathenaic Stadium. Inscribed along the inner edge is the country of issuance 'HELLENIC REPUBLIC' and '75 YEARS IN MEMORIAM OF SPYROS LOUIS' (in Greek). Above the cup appears the year of issuance '2015' and to the right a palmette (the mint mark of the Greek Mint). Visible at the bottom of the design is the monogram of the artist (George Stamatopoulos). The coin's outer ring depicts the 12 stars of the European flag.
	Andorra	25 years of Customs Union with the EU	85,000 coins	18 July 2016
The design shows at the top the map of Andorra with the coat of arms of the Principality highlighted inside it. At the bottom of the design, two opposing arrows interlaced, symbolising the Customs Agreement between Andorra and the EU, show the years that are being commemorated '1990' and '2015' (the latter is also the year of issue of the coin) and the name of the issuing country 'ANDORRA'. Surrounding the map of Andorra appears the inscription '25è aniversari de la Signatura de l'Acord Duaner amb la Unió Europea' (25th anniversary of the Signature of the Customs Agreement with the European Union). The coin's outer ring depicts the 12 stars of the European flag.
	Andorra	30 years since 18 became Legal Age	85,000 coins	18 July 2016
The design shows a partial reproduction of a young person casting a vote. The ballot that the figure is holding reproduces the inscription 'ANDORRA'. To the left of the figure there are the years that are being commemorated '1985' and '2015' (the latter is the year of issue of the coin as well). A shorter inscription of the commemoration surrounds the whole design '30è ANIVERSARI MAJORIA D'EDAT ALS 18 ANYS' (30th anniversary Coming of Age at 18 years old). The coin's outer ring depicts the 12 stars of the European flag.

=== 2015 commonly issued coin ===
Image	Country	Feature	Volume	Date
	European Union	The 30th anniversary of the EU flag	51,383,304 coins	6 August – 23 December 2015
To celebrate thirty years of the EU flag, euro-area Finance Ministers decided that euro-area Member States would strike a 2-euro commemorative coin using a common design on the national side. Euro-area citizens and residents have selected by public web-voting the winning design. Voters had a choice of five designs, which had been pre-selected by a professional jury following a design competition among European Mints, and they choose the design created by Mr Georgios Stamatopoulos, professional designer at the Bank of Greece.
	Finland	The 30th anniversary of the EU flag	500,000 coins	6 August 2015
The design shows the EU flag as a symbol that unites people and cultures with shared visions and ideals for a better common future. Twelve stars that morph into human figures are embracing the birth of a new Europe. At the top right, in semi-circle, are the issuing country 'SUOMI FINLAND' and the years '1985–2015'. At the right side, in between the flag and the years is the mint mark. At the bottom right are the initials of the artist (Georgios Stamatopoulos). The coin's outer ring depicts the 12 stars of the European flag.
	Slovakia	The 30th anniversary of the EU flag	1 million coins	24 September 2015
The design shows the EU flag as a symbol that unites people and cultures with shared visions and ideals for a better common future. Twelve stars that morph into human figures are embracing the birth of a new Europe. At the top right, in semi-circle, are the issuing country 'SLOVENSKO' and the years '1985–2015'. At the right side, in between the flag and the years is the mint mark of the Kremnica Mint (Mincovňa Kremnica), consisting of the initials 'MK' placed between two dies. At the bottom right are the initials of the artist (Georgios Stamatopoulos). The coin's outer ring depicts the 12 stars of the European flag.
	Netherlands	The 30th anniversary of the EU flag	1 million coins	13 October 2015
The design shows the EU flag as a symbol that unites people and cultures with shared visions and ideals for a better common future. Twelve stars that morph into human figures are embracing the birth of a new Europe. At the top is the issuing country 'NEDERLAND'. At the right are the years '1985–2015'. In between the flag and the years is the mint master mark and the mint mark. At the bottom right are the initials of the artist (Georgios Stamatopoulos). The coin's outer ring depicts the 12 stars of the European flag.
	Ireland	The 30th anniversary of the EU flag	1 million coins	16 October 2015
The design shows the EU flag as a symbol that unites people and cultures with shared visions and ideals for a better common future. Twelve stars that morph into human figures are embracing the birth of a new Europe. At the top right, in semi-circle, are the issuing country 'éiRe' and the years '1985–2015'. At the bottom right are the initials of the artist (Georgios Stamatopoulos). The coin's outer ring depicts the 12 stars of the European flag.
	Austria	The 30th anniversary of the EU flag	2.5 million coins	30 October 2015
The design shows the EU flag as a symbol that unites people and cultures with shared visions and ideals for a better common future. Twelve stars that morph into human figures are embracing the birth of a new Europe. At the top right, in semi-circle, are the issuing country 'REPUBLIK ÖSTERREICH' and the years '1985–2015'. At the bottom right are the initials of the artist (Georgios Stamatopoulos). The coin's outer ring depicts the 12 stars of the European flag.
	Latvia	The 30th anniversary of the EU flag	1,010,000 coins	3 November 2015
The design shows the EU flag as a symbol that unites people and cultures with shared visions and ideals for a better common future. Twelve stars that morph into human figures are embracing the birth of a new Europe. At the top right, in semi-circle, are the issuing country 'LATVIJA' and the years '1985–2015'. At the bottom right are the initials of the artist (Georgios Stamatopoulos). The coin's outer ring depicts the 12 stars of the European flag.
	Germany	The 30th anniversary of the EU flag	30,125,000 coins	5 November 2015
The design shows the EU flag as a symbol that unites people and cultures with shared visions and ideals for a better common future. Twelve stars that morph into human figures are embracing the birth of a new Europe. At the top right, in semi-circle, are the issuing country 'BUNDESREPUBLIK DEUTSCHLAND' and the years '1985–2015'. At the right side, in between the flag and the years is the mint mark. At the bottom right are the initials of the artist (Georgios Stamatopoulos). The coin's outer ring depicts the 12 stars of the European flag.
	Italy	The 30th anniversary of the EU flag	1,005,000 coins	9 November 2015
The design shows the EU flag as a symbol that unites people and cultures with shared visions and ideals for a better common future. Twelve stars that morph into human figures are embracing the birth of a new Europe. At the top right, in semi-circle, are the issuing country 'REPUBBLICA ITALIANA' and the years '1985–2015'. At the right side, in between the flag and the years is the mint mark R. At the bottom right are the initials of the artist (Georgios Stamatopoulos). The coin's outer ring depicts the 12 stars of the European flag.
	France	The 30th anniversary of the EU flag	4,020,000 coins	16 November 2015
The design shows the EU flag as a symbol that unites people and cultures with shared visions and ideals for a better common future. Twelve stars that morph into human figures are embracing the birth of a new Europe. At the top right, in semi-circle, are the issuing country 'RÉPUBLIQUE FRANÇAISE' and the years '1985–2015'. At the right side, in between the flag and the years are the mint mark and the mint master mark. At the bottom right are the initials of the artist (Georgios Stamatopoulos). The coin's outer ring depicts the 12 stars of the European flag.
	Lithuania	The 30th anniversary of the EU flag	750,000 coins	17 November 2015
The design shows the EU flag as a symbol that unites people and cultures with shared visions and ideals for a better common future. Twelve stars that morph into human figures are embracing the birth of a new Europe. At the top right, in semi-circle, are the issuing country 'LIETUVA' and the years '1985–2015'. At the right side, in between the flag and the years is the mint mark. At the bottom right are the initials of the artist (Georgios Stamatopoulos). The coin's outer ring depicts the 12 stars of the European flag.
	Belgium	The 30th anniversary of the EU flag	412,500 coins	18 November 2015
The design shows the EU flag as a symbol that unites people and cultures with shared visions and ideals for a better common future. Twelve stars that morph into human figures are embracing the birth of a new Europe. At the top right, in semi-circle, are the issuing country in the three national languages 'BELGIE-BELGIQUE-BELGIEN' and the years '1985–2015'. At the right side, in between the flag and the years are the mint master mark and the mint mark, a helmeted profile of the archangel Michael. At the bottom right are the initials of the artist (Georgios Stamatopoulos). The coin's outer ring depicts the 12 stars of the European flag.
	Cyprus	The 30th anniversary of the EU flag	350,000 coins	30 November 2015
The design shows the EU flag as a symbol that unites people and cultures with shared visions and ideals for a better common future. Twelve stars that morph into human figures are embracing the birth of a new Europe. At the top right, in semi-circle, are the name of the issuing country 'ΚΥΠΡΟΣ KIBRIS' and the years '1985–2015'. At the bottom right are the initials of the artist (Georgios Stamatopoulos). The coin's outer ring depicts the 12 stars of the European flag.
	Portugal	The 30th anniversary of the EU flag	520,000 coins	30 November 2015
The design shows the EU flag as a symbol that unites people and cultures with shared visions and ideals for a better common future. Twelve stars that morph into human figures are embracing the birth of a new Europe. At the top right, in semi-circle, are the issuing country 'PORTUGAL' and the years '1985–2015'. At the right side, in between the flag and the years is the mint mark 'INCM'. At the bottom right are the initials of the artist (Georgios Stamatopoulos). The coin's outer ring depicts the 12 stars of the European flag.
	Spain	The 30th anniversary of the EU flag	4 million coins	1 December 2015
The design shows the EU flag as a symbol that unites people and cultures with shared visions and ideals for a better common future. Twelve stars that morph into human figures are embracing the birth of a new Europe. At the top right, in semi-circle, are the issuing country 'ESPAÑA' and the years '1985–2015'. At the right side, in between the flag and the years is the mint mark. At the bottom right are the initials of the artist (Georgios Stamatopoulos). The coin's outer ring depicts the 12 stars of the European flag.
	Luxembourg	The 30th anniversary of the EU flag	510,000 coins	3 December 2015
The design shows the EU flag as a symbol that unites people and cultures with shared visions and ideals for a better common future. Twelve stars that morph into human figures are embracing the birth of a new Europe. At the top right, in semi-circle, are the issuing country 'LËTZEBUERG' and the years '1985–2015'. In between the flag and the years is the mint master mark. At the bottom right are the initials of the artist (Georgios Stamatopoulos). The coin's outer ring depicts the 12 stars of the European flag. Note: In accordance with the national law, the coin shows an effigy of the Grand Duke as a latent image.
	Slovenia	The 30th anniversary of the EU flag	1 million coins	7 December 2015
The design shows the EU flag as a symbol that unites people and cultures with shared visions and ideals for a better common future. Twelve stars that morph into human figures are embracing the birth of a new Europe. At the top right, in semi-circle, are the issuing country 'SLOVENIJA' and the years '1985–2015'. At the bottom right are the initials of the artist (Georgios Stamatopoulos). The coin's outer ring depicts the 12 stars of the European flag.
	Estonia	The 30th anniversary of the EU flag	350,000 coins	10 December 2015
The design shows the EU flag as a symbol that unites people and cultures with shared visions and ideals for a better common future. Twelve stars that morph into human figures are embracing the birth of a new Europe. At the top right, in semi-circle, are the issuing country 'EESTI' and the years '1985–2015'. At the bottom right are the initials of the artist (Georgios Stamatopoulos). The coin's outer ring depicts the 12 stars of the European flag.
	Malta	The 30th anniversary of the EU flag	300,000 coins	18 December 2015
The design shows the EU flag as a symbol that unites people and cultures with shared visions and ideals for a better common future. Twelve stars that morph into human figures are embracing the birth of a new Europe. At the top is the issuing country 'MALTA' and at the right the years '1985–2015'. At the bottom right are the initials of the artist (Georgios Stamatopoulos). The coin's outer ring depicts the 12 stars of the European flag.
	Greece	The 30th anniversary of the EU flag	750,000 coins	23 December 2015
The design shows the EU flag as a symbol that unites people and cultures with shared visions and ideals for a better common future. Twelve stars that morph into human figures are embracing the birth of a new Europe. At the top right, in semi-circle, are the issuing country HELLENIC REPUBLIC in Greek and the years '1985–2015'. In between the flag and the years is the mint mark. At the bottom right are the initials of the artist (Georgios Stamatopoulos). The coin's outer ring depicts the 12 stars of the European flag.

=== 2016 coinage ===
Image	Country	Feature	Volume	Date
	Austria	200th anniversary of the founding of Austria's central bank Oesterreichische Nationalbank	16,060,000 coins	2 December 2015 (sets); January 2016 (rolls)
The design depicts two gods of Roman mythology featured in the carved relief above the entrance to the main building of the Oesterreichische Nationalbank (OeNB): to the left, Mercury, the messenger of the gods and the god of merchants and commerce; to the right, Fortuna, the goddess of fate and prosperity, who is portrayed with a horn of plenty. The background picture, running from the left to the right edges of the core, shows the OeNB's main premises. An ornamental band hugging the bottom of the coin centre evokes the red-white-red pattern of the Austrian national flag, with hatched vertical lines symbolizing the colour red, as laid down in the rules of heraldic design. The years '1816' and '2016' to the left of Mercury refer to the OeNB's founding year and its bicentennial. The inscriptions running along the edges of the gold-coloured centre read 'Republik Österreich' (Republic of Austria) and '200 Jahre Oesterreichische Nationalbank' (200 years Oesterreichische Nationalbank). The coin's outer ring depicts the 12 stars of the European flag.
	Estonia	100 years since the birth of Paul Keres	500,000 coins	7 January 2016
The coin features a portrait of the great Estonian chess player Paul Keres with some chess pieces. At the top left in semi-circle is the inscription 'PAUL KERES'. At the left side is the name of the issuing country 'EESTI' and underneath is the year of issuance '2016'. The coin's outer ring depicts the 12 stars of the European flag.
	Ireland	100 years since Easter Rising	4.5 million coins	20 January 2016
The designs shows the statue of Hibernia which stands on the top of the General Post Office building whose seizure back in 1916 marked the beginning of the Easter rising. She is a symbol of Ireland. Her name was taken from the ancient Greek reference for Ireland and her form was realised by the sculptor John Smyth. She is viewed as a witness to the events of 1916 and for one hundred years since she has seen the nation blossom before her based on the ideals set out in the Proclamation. She continues to look forward and is a symbol of the past, present and future of the country. At the top of the inner circle, the inscription 'HIBERNIA' appears in hand-rendered lettering that takes influence form the historic Book of Kells. The sunrays reflect well the underlying concept of the Rising and the Proclamation e.g. dawning of the new nation/Republic. The image of the statue is flanked by the years '1916' and '2016'. At the bottom of the inner circle appears the name of the issuing country 'éire' and underneath it the year of issuance '2016'. The coin's outer ring depicts the 12 stars of the European flag.
	Spain	Old city of Segovia and its aqueduct Seventh of the UNESCO World Heritage Sites series	4 million coins	5 February 2016
The design depicts in the foreground the aqueduct of Segovia. At the top of the inner circle and in circular sense is the name of the issuing country 'ESPAÑA' and underneath it the year of issuance '2016'. At the top right is the mint mark. The coin's outer ring depicts the 12 stars of the European flag.
	Germany	Zwinger Palace in Dresden; Eleventh of the Bundesländer I series	30,663,000 coins	5 February 2016
The design shows a view from the inner yard of the world-famous Dresden Zwinger to the Crown Gate. The inner part also features the name 'SACHSEN' and the issuing country's country code 'D' at the bottom, the mint mark of the respective mint ('A', 'D', 'F', 'G' or 'J') as well as the engraver's mark (the initials 'JT' — Jordi Truxa) right at the top and the year '2016' left at the top. The coin's outer ring depicts the 12 stars of the European flag.
	France	XV European Football Championship	10,020,500 coins	5 February 2016
Held every four years since 1960, the UEFA men's football European Championship, commonly referred to as 'the Euro', will take place in France from 10 June to 10 July 2016. Euro 2016, the fifteenth edition of the European Football Championship, is organised by the Union of European Football Associations and brings together the best men's football teams in Europe. The winner of the competition receives a small-scale version of the Henri Delaunay Cup, named after the man who invented the competition. The design of the coin features the Henri Delaunay Cup in the middle of an outline map of France, along with the two marks of the Paris Mint. The letters RF for République Française (French Republic) are to the right of the map of France, and the name of the competition 'UEFA EURO 2016 France' is written above it. Below the map, a football stands out in the foreground. All of this is set on a background that features graphical elements representing the competition. The coin's outer ring depicts the 12 stars of the European flag.
	Slovakia	Slovak Presidency of the Council of the European Union	1 million coins	7 March 2016
The design is dominated by the coat of arms of the Slovak Republic at its centre against a background of dynamic centripetal lines representing the position and importance of the Slovak Republic during its presidency in the Council of the European Union. To the right of the coat of arms of the Slovak Republic is the year '2016'. Around the edge of the inner circle are the country name 'SLOVENSKO' (Slovakia) and the inscription 'PREDSEDNÍCTVO SR V RADE EÚ' (Slovak Presidency of the EU Council), which are separated by graphical symbols. The mint mark of the Kremnica Mint, composed of the letters 'MK' between two dies, and the stylised initials of the designer of the national side, Vladimír Pavlica, 'VP', are placed in the lower part of the composition. The coin's outer ring depicts the 12 stars of the European flag.
	Belgium	2016 Summer Olympics – Rio de Janeiro	375,000 coins	24 March 2016
The inner part of the coin depicts, from top to bottom, a stylised figure, the five Olympic rings and the inscription 'TEAM BELGIUM'. The year 2016 is written on the left-hand side of the coin. The country code 'BE' appears on the right-hand side of the coin, between the mark of the Brussels mint, a helmeted profile of the archangel Michael, and the signature mark of the Master of the Mint. The coin's outer ring depicts the 12 stars of the European flag.
	San Marino	550 years since the death of Donatello	87,800 coins	5 April 2016
The design depicts, in the foreground on the left, a portrait of David, being a detail of the bronze sculpture by Donatello. At centre top, the mintmark 'R'; on the right, the name of the issuing country 'SAN MARINO'; at bottom right, the inscription 'Donatello', the dates '1466–2016' and, in the centre, the initials of the artist 'MB'. The coin's outer ring depicts the 12 stars of the European flag.
	Finland	90th anniversary of the death of Eino Leino	1 million coins	25 April 2016
At the inner part of the coin is a flame, and a poker pointing upwards to the right. The inscription 'EINO LEINO', in semi-circle and the year of issuance '2016' are placed at the right. At the bottom left is the indication of the issuing country 'FI' and the mint mark. The coin's outer ring depicts the 12 stars of the European flag.
	Italy	550 years since the death of Donatello	1.5 million coins	29 April 2016
Head of the David by Donatello (detail of the bronze sculpture kept in Florence, National Museum of Bargello): on the left the logo of the Italian Republic 'RI'; below on two lines, '1466' and '2016'; on the right 'C.M.', the initials of the author Claudia Momoni; below 'DONATELLO'. The coin's outer ring depicts the 12 stars of the European flag.
	Portugal	Portuguese athletes participating in the 2016 Summer Olympics	680,000 coins	3 May 2016
The design depicts a visual composition based on the well-known work of art signed by the author, Mrs Joanna Vasconcelos, the 'Heart of Viana', inspired by traditional jewelry from the North of Portugal (around the city of Viana do Castelo). It symbolises the support of the Portuguese people to the national team by the occasion of the Games. At the left and the right, in semi-circle, are the inscriptions 'JOANA VASCONCELOS' and 'EQUIPA OLÍMPICA DE PORTUGAL 2016', respectively. At the bottom is the mintmark 'INCM'. The coin's outer ring depicts the 12 stars of the European flag.
	Lithuania	Baltic Culture	1 million coins	3 May 2016
The design shows an amber disc, one of the most characteristic symbols of the Baltic culture. The disc is decorated with a crosspiece of drilled dots — an ornament symbolising the world's axis. At the top is the name of the issuing country 'LIETUVA', flanked by the mint mark and the year of issuance '2016'. The coin's outer ring depicts the 12 stars of the European flag.
	Luxembourg	50 years of Grand Duchess Charlotte Bridge	517,500 coins	6 May 2016
The design shows the bridge 'Grand Duchess Charlotte' which is the main route connecting the city centre of Luxembourg to the urban quarter of Kirchberg, the site of the city's European Union institutions. The text 'Pont Grande-Duchesse Charlotte' (Bridge Grand Duchess Charlotte) and underneath the year '1966' are inscribed on the image of the bridge. At the top of the design are depicted the effigy of the Grand Duke Henri of Luxembourg and at its left the year of issuance '2016'. At the bottom appears the name of the issuing country 'LUXEMBOURG'. The coin's outer ring depicts the 12 stars of the European flag.
	Italy	2200 years since the death of Plautus	1,500,000 coins	21 May 2016
Theatre masks representing two characters of the New Comedy, the young woman and the slave, from a mosaic of the 2nd century A.D. (Rome, Capitoline Museums); around construction plan of a Roman theatre and the logo of the Italian Republic 'RI'; on the left side 'R' and on the right side 'LDS', initials of the author Luciana De Simoni; below '184 a. C.', '2016' and 'PLAUTO'. The coin's outer ring depicts the 12 stars of the European flag.
	Belgium	International Missing Children's Day	1,020,000 coins	25 May 2016
The inner part of the coin displays in its centre the face of a child surrounded by the words 'MISSING-DISPARU-VERMIST', 'WWW.CHILDFOCUS.BE' and the trilingual indication of nationality 'BELGIQUE-BELGIE-BELGIEN' followed by the year 2016. The mark of the Brussels mint, a helmeted profile of the archangel Michael and the signature mark of the Master of the Mint appear to the left and right respectively of the face. The coin's outer ring depicts the 12 stars of the European flag.
	Monaco	150th anniversary of the founding of Monte Carlo by Charles III	15,000 coins	1 June 2016
The design shows CHARLES III within the background MONTE CARLO. At the top is the name of the issuing country 'MONACO' flanked by the mint mark and the mint master mark. At the bottom, in semi-circle from left to right is the inscription '1866 CHARLES III FONDE MONTE CARLO 2016'. The coin's outer ring depicts the 12 stars of the European flag.
	Vatican City	The 200th anniversary of the Vatican Guard	105,000 coins	2 June 2016
The national face features a Vatican Guard in front of the Dome of St. Peter's Basilica. At the top, in semi-circle is the inscription 'CORPO DELLA GENDARMERIA 1816–2016'. At the bottom, in semi-circle is the name of the issuing country 'CITTÀ DEL VATICANO'. The mint mark 'R' appears at the left of the design and the name of the designer 'D. Longo' appears at the right. The coin's outer ring depicts the 12 stars of the European flag.
	Slovenia	The 25th anniversary of independence of the Republic of Slovenia	1 million coins	20 June 2016
Over the left part of the inner circle is obliquely positioned a line. At its right, in the upper part of the coin is the inscription '25 LET' and below it the inscription 'REPUBLIKA SLOVENIJA'. Underneath these inscriptions is the original Prešeren's written record of the part of the Slovenian hymn Zdravljica 'dočákat' dan'. At the bottom of the inner circle is the year '2016'. The coin's outer ring depicts the 12 stars of the European flag.
	Latvia	Latvian agricultural industry	1,010,000 coins	19 July 2016
The designs shows a Latvian brown cow which is one of the symbols of Latvian dairy farming both in folklore and in life. Underneath the design, at the left side there is the inscription of the year of issuance '2016' and at the bottom of the inner circle the name of the issuing country 'LATVIJA'. The coin's outer ring depicts the 12 stars of the European flag.
	Portugal	50 years since inauguration of 25 April Bridge	500,000 coins	19 July 2016
The design depicts the image of the bridge. At the top right is the inscription 'PORTUGAL'. At the bottom right are the inscriptions 'PONTE', '25 DE ABRIL', '1966' and '2016', one below the other. At the bottom left is the mintmark 'INCM' and at the bottom centre is the name of the designer 'JOSÉ AURÉLIO'. The coin's outer ring depicts the 12 stars of the European flag.
	Malta	Ġgantija; First of the Maltese Prehistoric Sites series	350,000 coins	22 August 2016
The coin depicts the Ġgantija Temples situated on the Island of Gozo. Ġgantija is a megalithic temple complex dating to the Neolithic ages. It is one of the world's oldest free-standing structures, as well as one of the oldest religious structures. Built approximately in the 36th century BC, Ġgantija pre-dates Stonehenge and the Egyptian Pyramids. At the top right the inscription 'ĠGANTIJA TEMPLES' and underneath the years '3800–3200 BC'. At the bottom left the name of the country of issuance 'MALTA' and underneath the year of issuance '2016', flanked by the mint master mark and the mint mark. The coin's outer ring depicts the 12 stars of the European flag.
	France	100 years since the birth of François Mitterrand	10,020,000 coins	12 September 2016
The design shows a profile of a pensive François Mitterrand. Adjacent is his personal emblem of a half oak/half olive tree. Above are the dates marking the centenary of his birth ('1916' and '2016') and his name. At the bottom, the indication of the issuing country 'RF'. The coin's outer ring depicts the 12 stars of the European flag.
	San Marino	400 years since the death of William Shakespeare	85,000 coins	22 September 2016
The design depicts a portrait of the poet. On the right, in a semi-circle, the dates '1616–2016' and the name of the issuing country 'San Marino'; on the bottom right, the initials of the artist 'MB'. On the left, in a semi-circle, the inscription 'William Shakespeare'; on the bottom left, the mintmark 'R'. The coin's outer ring depicts the 12 stars of the European flag.
	Vatican City	Holy Year of Mercy	105,000 coins	13 October 2016
The national face features St Martin of Tours sharing his cloak with a poor man. The design is surrounded by the inscriptions 'GIUBILEO DELLA MISERICORDIA' at the left and 'CITTÀ DEL VATICANO' at the right, both in semi-circle. At the right there is as well the year of issuance '2016' and at the bottom the mint mark 'R' and the name of the artist 'M. CRISCIOTTI'. The coin's outer ring depicts the 12 stars of the European flag.
	Finland	100th anniversary of the birth of Georg Henrik von Wright	1 million coins	17 October 2016
At the inner part of the coin is an ancient Doric pillar, and an oak branch at the left. The inscription 'GEORG HENRIK VON WRIGHT' is placed in semi-circle from left to right and the year of issuance '2016' is placed on the top at the right. On the top at the left is the indication of the issuing country 'FI' and the mint mark. The coin's outer ring depicts the 12 stars of the European flag.
	Latvia	Vidzeme; First of the Latvian Historical Regions series	1,030,000 coins	15 November 2016
The designs shows the coat of arms of the historical region of Latvia — Vidzeme or Livland. At the top there is the inscription of the issuing country 'LATVIJA' and at the bottom the inscription 'VIDZEME'. At the right is the year of issuance '2016'. The coin's outer ring depicts the 12 stars of the European flag.
	Malta	Solidarity through love First of the From Children in Solidarity series	380,000 coins	5 December 2016
This coin is envisaged to commemorate the role of the Malta Community Chest Fund in Society through a programme for secondary school students entitled 'From Children in Solidarity'. This programme identifies the social role of children in five different areas with the first theme being 'Solidarity through Love'. This design was created by Ms Sarah Cilia a secondary school student who has expressed this theme through two hands forming a heart shape which displays a representation of the Maltese flag. At the bottom of the design is the inscription 'MALTA 2016'. Two stylised representations of human bodies are designed on the left wrist and two on the right one. The coin's outer ring depicts the 12 stars of the European flag.
	Greece	150 years since the Arkadi Monastery torching	750,000 coins	16 December 2016
The design features the Arkadi Monastery. Inscribed, at centre, is the wording 'ARKADI MONASTERY' and along the inner edge at left 'HELLENIC REPUBLIC', in Greek. Visible at upper right is the year of issuance '2016' and below the central inscription a palmette (the mintmark of the Greek Mint). Inscribed at lower right is the monogram of the artist (George Stamatopoulos). The coin's outer ring depicts the 12 stars of the European flag.
	Greece	120 years since the birth of Dimitri Mitropoulos	750,000 coins	16 December 2016
The design features the portrait of Dimitri Mitropoulos against the background of music notes. Inscribed along the inner edge at left is the wording '120 YEARS OF THE BIRTH OF DIMITRI MITROPOULOS' and 'HELLENIC REPUBLIC', in Greek. At upper left appears the year of issuance '2016' and a palmette (the mintmark of the Greek Mint). Visible at lower right is the monogram of the artist (George Stamatopoulos). The coin's outer ring depicts the 12 stars of the European flag.
	Andorra	25th anniversary of the Radio and Television of Andorra	85,000 coins	1 June 2017
The design shows a microphone and an antenna circled by several circular lines with the inscription '25è ANIVERSARI DE RÀDIO I TELEVISIÓ D'ANDORRA', the year of issuance '2016' and the name of the State of issuance 'ANDORRA'. This commemorative coin celebrates the 25th anniversary of the establishment of the Andorran public media with the beginning of the broadcast of the Andorran public radio and public television. The coin's outer ring depicts the 12 stars of the European flag.
	Andorra	150 years of the New Reform 1866	85,000 coins	1 June 2017
The design shows the main room of 'Casa de la Vall' (premises of the Andorran Parliament) with the inscription '150 ANYS DE LA NOVA REFORMA DE 1866', the year of issuance '2016' and the name of the State of issuance 'ANDORRA'. This commemorative coin celebrates the 150 years of the New Reform Decree, one of the biggest steps on the Andorran and on the Consell General (Andorran Parliament) history, which represented a social and political transformation in the Principality of Andorra. The coin's outer ring depicts the 12 stars of the European flag.

=== 2017 coinage ===
Image	Country	Feature	Volume	Date
	Luxembourg	50 years since the foundation of the current Luxembourg Army	316,000 coins	2 January 2017
The design shows on the right hand the effigy of His Royal Highness, the Grand-Duke Henri, looking to the right and on the left hand the text '50 Joer Fräiwëllegen-Arméi' composed as logo. At the top of the design is depicted the year-date '2017', flanked by the mintmark and the initials of the Mintmaster. At the bottom appears the name of the issuing country 'LËTZEBUERG'. The coin's outer ring depicts the 12 stars of the European flag.
	Slovakia	Universitas Istropolitana – 550 years since the start of teaching	1 million coins	4 January 2017
The design shows the figure of a teacher and two students positioned before the facade of the building of the former Universitas Istropolitana in Bratislava. In the upper left of the design is a medallion of King Matthias Corvinus, the founder of the university. Above the medallion is the inscription '1467', the year in which the university was opened. The country of issuance 'SLOVENSKO' appears at the base of the inner circle, above the year of issuance '2017'. Along the left edge of the inner circle is the inscription 'UNIVERZITA', and along the right edge 'ISTROPOLITANA'. In the lower left of the design is the mint mark of the Kremnica Mint (Mincovňa Kremnica), consisting of the initials 'MK' placed between two dies. Below the mint mark are the stylised letters 'MP', the initials of the designer, Mária Poldaufová. The coin's outer ring depicts the 12 stars of the European flag.
	Slovenia	10th anniversary of the adoption of the Euro	1 million coins	2 February 2017
The design shows 10 flying swallows which form a circle. At the lower half, in semi-circle, the inscription '10 LET SKUPNE EVROPSKE VALUTE'. At the top left the inscription 'SLOVENIJA 2017'. Between the inscriptions is engraved a dot. The coin's outer ring depicts the 12 stars of the European flag.
	Spain	Monuments of Oviedo and the Kingdom of Asturias: Santa María del Naranco; Eighth of the UNESCO World Heritage Sites series	538,500 coins	3 February 2017
The design depicts in the foreground Santa Maria del Naranco Church. At the top of the inner circle and in circular sense is the name of the issuing country 'ESPAÑA' and underneath, to the right, the year of issuance '2017'. At the left side of the inner circle is the mint mark. The coin's outer ring depicts the 12 stars of the European flag.
	Germany	Porta Nigra in Trier; Twelfth of the Bundesländer I series	30 million coins	3 February 2017
The design shows the Porta Nigra in Trier which is probably the best-preserved Roman city gate north of the Alps. The inner part also features the name 'RHEINLAND-PFALZ' and the issuing country's code 'D' at the bottom. The mint mark of the respective mint ('A', 'D', 'F', 'G' or 'J') appears at the left and the year '2017' appears at the top. At the right, the initials of the designer 'CH' (Chocola Frantisek). The coin's outer ring depicts the 12 stars of the European flag.
	France	100 years since the death of Auguste Rodin	10 million coins	3 February 2017
For the 100th anniversary of his death, Monnaie de Paris pays tribute to the illustrious French sculptor Auguste Rodin. Born in 1840, he is one of the major icons of the realistic style. His works such as The Thinker, The Kiss, The Hell's Door or The Calais' Bourgeois remain timeless masterpieces of the world sculpture. The design represents Auguste Rodin and The Thinker, his best known work, like forehead to forehead. The RF mention standing for République Française is drawn as sculpted on the top of the coin. The name of the artist 'A. Rodin' and the relevant dates '1917–2017' are inscribed in his beard. The coin's outer ring depicts the 12 stars of the European flag.
	Italy	400 years since the completion of St Mark's Basilica	1.5 million coins	22 March 2017
Façade of the Basilica of San Marco in Venice; in the exergue the dates '1617' and '2017', respectively year of the completion of the Basilica and year of the issue of the coin, beside the logo of the Italian Republic 'RI'; below the inscription 'SAN MARCO'; on the right 'LDS', initials of the author Luciana De Simoni; on the top the inscription 'VENEZIA', and the mintmark of the Mint of Rome 'R'. The coin's outer ring depicts the 12 stars of the European flag.
	San Marino	750 years since the birth of Giotto	73,100 coins	30 March 2017
On the left a detail from the clock tower of Santa Maria del Fiore in Florence, one of Giotto's architectural works; vertically, the words SAN MARINO, GIOTTO and the dates 1267–2017; on the right a detail from the portrait of Giotto and the abbreviation of the artist Luciana De Simoni (LDS); on the bottom, the letter R, indicating the 'Zecca' (mint) of Rome. The coin's outer ring depicts the 12 stars of the European flag.
	Belgium	200 years University of Liège	200,000 coins	21 April 2017
The inner part of the piece represents the logo of the University of Liege, with the dates 1817 — 2017 below, surrounded by the inscription 200 ANS UNIVERSITE DE LIEGE — 200 YEARS UNIVERSITY OF LIEGE and the country indication BE. The mintmark of Brussels, a helmeted head of the Archangel Michael and the mint directors' mintmark, the coat of arms of the municipality Herzele, are located respectively on the right and left of the country indication. The coin's outer ring depicts the 12 stars of the European flag.
	Malta	Ħaġar Qim; Second of the Maltese Prehistoric Sites series	405,000 coins	31 May 2017
The coin depicts the prehistoric temples of Hagar Qim. At the top right the inscriptions 'HAGAR QIM', 'TEMPLES' and the years '3600–3200 BC' one under the other. At the bottom left the name of the country of issuance 'MALTA' and underneath the year of issuance '2017'. At the bottom right the initials 'NGB' of the artist Noel Galea Bason. The coin's outer ring depicts the 12 stars of the European flag.
	Finland	100 years of independence	2.5 million coins	1 June 2017
The inner part of the coin has a mosaic design, with the more sparsely set pieces on the right forming a cartographic likeness of Finland. The text 'SUOMI FINLAND', the year of independence '1917' and the year of issuance '2017' are placed vertically one below another at the left. In the middle right is the indication of the issuing country 'FI' and the mint mark. The coin's outer ring depicts the 12 stars of the European flag.
	Vatican City	1950 years since the death of the martyrs Saint Peter and Paul the Apostle	90,000 coins	1 June 2017
The design features Saint Peter and Saint Paul and their symbols, respectively the keys and the sword. At the top is the inscription 'CITTÀ DEL VATICANO', in semi-circle. At the bottom, in semi-circle is the inscription '1950o DEL MARTIRIO DEI SANTI PIETRO E PAOLO'. At the bottom left is the year of issuance '2017' and at the bottom right is the mint mark 'R'. Between them is the name of the artist 'G. TITOTTO'. The coin's outer ring depicts the 12 stars of the European flag.
	Italy	2000 years since the death of Titus Livius	1.5 million coins	23 June 2017
Bust of the Roman historian Titus Livius, taken from a work by Lorenzo Larese Moretti; on the left the logo of the Italian Republic 'RI', and 'C.M.' initials of the author Claudia Momoni; on the right '17' and '2017', respectively year of the death of Livius and year of the issue of the coin, and the mintmark of the Mint of Rome 'R'; around circle of dots and the inscription 'TITO • LIVIO'. The coin's outer ring depicts the 12 stars of the European flag.
	Estonia	Estonia's road to independence	1.5 million coins	26 June 2017
The coin features the sinuous trunk of an oak tree where on one side there are depicted the branches and on the other side the leaves. The branches symbolize the time of revolutions and hardships from which the road to Estonia's Independence was paved. The leaves symbolize the strength, achievements and longevity of Estonia. At the bottom left side of the trunk there is the word 'MAAPÄEV' (Provisional Assembly of Estonia) and above that the year '1917'. At the bottom right side there is the name of the issuing country 'EESTI' and below that the year of issuance '2017'. The coin's outer ring depicts the 12 stars of the European flag.
	Greece	60 years since the death of Nikos Kazantzakis	750,000 coins	10 July 2017
The design features a profile portrait of Nikos Kazantzakis, one of Greece's greatest 20th century writers. Inscribed along the inner circle, at the left, is the wording 'HELLENIC REPUBLIC' and the name 'NIKOS KAZANTZAKIS' (in Greek). At the top is the year of issuance '2017' and at centre left a palmette (the mint mark of the Greek Mint). Also visible at lower right is the monogram of the artist (George Stamatopoulos). The coin's outer ring depicts the 12 stars of the European flag.
	Portugal	150 years of Public Security (PSP)	520,000 coins	13 July 2017
The design shows human figures and buildings, symbolic representations of citizens and cities, where the public security is mainly assured and the simplified police symbol. The legends include the year '1867' and the year of issue '2017', the country of issue 'PORTUGAL', the subject of commemoration ('SEGURANÇA PÚBLICA' – Public Security), the three main issues related to citizenship ('DIREITOS', 'LIBERDADES' e 'GARANTIAS' – Rights, Freedoms and Warranties), and the author's name JOSÉ DE GUIMARÃES. The coin's outer ring depicts the 12 stars of the European flag.
	San Marino	International year of Sustainable Tourism	73,100 coins	31 August 2017
The design shows in the center Planet Earth surrounded by waves; to the right a circle with the letter A, symbol of the designer Andrew Lewis. Arched, above the writing "TURISMO SOSTENIBILE", below "SAN MARINO" and the year "2017"; to the right the initials of the engraver Uliana Pernazza "UP INC."; to the left the letter "R" of the Italian Mint which took care of the mintage. The United Nations General Assembly approved the adoption of 2017 as the International Year of Sustainable Tourism for Development. The idea of sustainable Tourism indicates a kind of travelling that respects the planet, it doesn't alter the natural, social and artistic environment and it doesn't inhibit the growth of social and economic activities. It is a kind of tourism opposite to mass tourism and it tends to promote the weakest economies. The Republic of San Marino dedicated a 2 euro commemorative coin, designed by the Canadian artist Andrew Lewis to this theme, in order to promote a new mentality and to encourage tourists' respect for environment. The coin's outer ring depicts the 12 stars of the European flag.
	Lithuania	Vilnius City of Culture	1 million coins	31 August 2017
The design shows a fragment of the Vilnius city panorama. At the left side is the inscription 'VILNIUS' and the mark of the designer. At the top right is the name of the issuing country 'LIETUVA' and the year of issuance '2017'. At the centre is the mintmark. The coin's outer ring depicts the 12 stars of the European flag.
	France	25 years of Breast cancer awareness	10 million coins	25 September 2017
Since the 1990s, the fight against breast cancer has been a major cause around the world. On the occasion of the 25th anniversary of the pink ribbon, iconic symbol of this fight, Monnaie de Paris has decided to support this cause. For nearly 15 years, a pink ribbon prize has been presented every year to support research efforts and innovation. The design represents a woman's bust symbolically protected by a hand and the ribbon. It is surrounded, at the right side, by the inscription '25e ANNIVERSAIRE DU RUBAN ROSE' (25th anniversary of the pink ribbon). The right side also features the years '1992 – 2017', the indication of the issuing country 'RF' and the mintmarks. The coin's outer ring depicts the 12 stars of the European flag.
	Belgium	200 years Ghent University	200,000 coins	29 September 2017
The inner part of the piece represents the logo of the Ghent University, with the dates 1817 – 2017 below, surrounded by the inscription 200 JAAR UNIVERSITEIT GENT – 200 YEARS GHENT UNIVERSITY and the country indication BE. The mintmark of Brussels, a helmeted head of the Archangel Michael and the mint directors' mintmark, the coat of arms of the municipality Herzele, are located respectively on the right and left of the country indication. The coin's outer ring depicts the 12 stars of the European flag.
	Vatican City	100 years since the visions of Fátima	105,000 coins	5 October 2017
The design features the three young shepherds to whom Mary appeared, on the background the Sanctuary of Fatima. At the top is the inscription 'CITTÀ DEL VATICANO' in semi-circle and right under is the year '1917'. Underneath the year, from left to right, is the inscription 'FATIMA 2017'. At the left side is the mintmark 'R' and at the bottom the name of the designer 'O.ROSSI'. The coin's outer ring depicts the 12 stars of the European flag.
	Greece	Archaeological site of Philippi	750,000 coins	12 October 2017
The design features part of Basilica B and linear motifs inspired by a border pattern from an ancient Greek mosaic discovered at the site. Inscribed along the inner circle is the wording 'ARCHAEOLOGICAL SITE OF PHILIPPI' and 'HELLENIC REPUBLIC' (in Greek). Also inscribed in the background is the year of issuance '2017' and to the right a palmette (the mint mark of the Greek Mint). Visible at the lower left is the monogram of the artist (George Stamatopoulos). The coin's outer ring depicts the 12 stars of the European flag.
	Finland	Finnish nature	500,000 coins	23 October 2017
The inner part of the coin has a design forming a cartographic likeness of the moon seen from Harmaja, Finland. On the top of the moon there is a crow sitting on a branch. The year of issuance '2017' is placed at the center bottom. At the center left is the indication of the issuing country 'FI'. The mint mark is placed center right. The coin's outer ring depicts the 12 stars of the European flag.
	Luxembourg	200 years since the birth of Grand Duke William III	311,000 coins	26 October 2017
The design shows on the left hand the effigy of His Royal Highness, the Grand-Duke Henri, looking to the left and on the right hand the effigy of HRH the Grand-Duke Guillaume III. At the top of the design is depicted the year-date '2017'. At the bottom appears the text 'GRANDS-DUCS DE LUXEMBOURG'. The name 'GUILLAUME III' followed by the indication of the year of birth '*1817' is depicted above the respective effigy. The coin's outer ring depicts the 12 stars of the European flag.
	Cyprus	Paphos, European Capital of Culture 2017	430,000 coins	3 November 2017
The design shows the 'Paphos Ancient Odeon', a small amphitheatre dating back to the 2nd century AD. Nowadays it is used in the summer for musical theatrical performances and it will be the venue of a number of events to be held within the program of 'Paphos 2017 – European Capital of Culture'. The issuing country's name 'ΚΥΠΡΟΣ KIBRIS' and the phrase 'Πάφος 2017 – Πολιτιστική πρωτεύουσα Ευρώπης' (i.e. Paphos 2017 – European capital of Culture) are inscribed on the inner part of the national side of the coin. The coin's outer ring depicts the 12 stars of the European flag.
	Monaco	200 years since the establishment of the Compagnie des Carabiniers du Prince	15,000 coins	13 November 2017
The design shows a CARABINIER and in the background the Palace of Monaco. At the top is the inscription 'MONACO' flanked by the mintmark and the mint master mark. At the bottom are the years '1817–2017' and underneath the inscription 'CARABINIERS DU PRINCE'. The coin's outer ring depicts the 12 stars of the European flag.
	Malta	Solidarity and peace Second of the From Children in Solidarity series	380,000 coins	13 November 2017
The coin's theme centres on the concept of solidarity and peace. The design was created by a school student and depicts two children holding the Maltese flag with the dove of peace flying over them. At the bottom is the name of the issuing country 'Malta' and at the right side is the year of issuance '2017'. The coin's outer ring depicts the 12 stars of the European flag.
	Latvia	Kurzeme; Second of the Latvian Historical Regions series	507,000 coins	14 November 2017
The design shows the coat of arms of the region of Kurzeme. At the top, the name of the issuing country 'LATVIJA' and at the bottom the inscription 'KURZEME'. At the right hand side, the year of issuance '2017'. The coin's outer ring depicts the 12 stars of the European flag.
	Latvia	Latgale; Third of the Latvian Historical Regions series	507,000 coins	14 November 2017
The design shows the coat of arms of the region of Latgale. At the top, the name of the issuing country 'LATVIJA' and at the bottom the inscription 'LATGALE'. At the right hand side, the year of issuance '2017'. The coin's outer ring depicts the 12 stars of the European flag.
	Portugal	150 years since the birth of Raul Brandão	520,000 coins	21 November 2017
The design shows the face of Raul Brandão. At the left side is the inscription RAUL BRANDÃO and underneath the years '1867' and '2017'. At the bottom right is the inscription of the country of issuance 'PORTUGAL' and at the top right is the name of the author 'LUIS FILIPE DE ABREU' followed by the mintmark 'INCM'. The coin's outer ring depicts the 12 stars of the European flag.
	Andorra	100 years of the anthem of Andorra	85,000 coins	8 February 2018
The design depicts a partial reproduction of the anthem of Andorra published in 1914. The central part of the design reproduces the first notes of the anthem flanked by an ornamentation of floral style and the inscription 'Himne Andorrà' (Andorran anthem). The upper part of the design shows the year of issuance '2017' and the inscription '100 anys de l'himne d'Andorra' (100 years of the anthem of Andorra). This coin commemorates the 100th anniversary of its admission as the national anthem of Andorra by agreement of the Consell General (Andorran Parliament) of 2 April 1917. The coin's outer ring depicts the 12 stars of the European flag.
	Andorra	Andorra – The Pyrenean country	85,000 coins	8 February 2018
The design reproduces on its upper part a triangle, consisting of three undulating strips representing a simplified version of the map of the country, with the inscriptions 'Andorra' and 'EL PAÍS DELS PIRINEUS' (the Pyrenean country). These three elements make up the brand owned by the Government of Andorra, which is used to provide a uniform, consistent and coordinated image to all graphic communication and, at the same time, achieve an unmistakable and instant identification. The lower part of the design depicts the year of issuance '2017'. The coin's outer ring depicts the 12 stars of the European flag.

=== 2018 coinage ===
Image	Country	Feature	Volume	Date
	Austria	100 years since the foundation of the Republic of Austria	18,100,100 coins	6 December 2017
The design depicts the statue of Pallas Athena in front of the Greek-style building of the Austrian Parliament in Vienna. The goddess of wisdom serves as a symbol of the Austrian parliamentarism and stands for knowledge, reason and strategic talent. At the left side is the year '2018' and underneath the text '100 JAHRE' (100 YEARS). The text 'REPUBLIK ÖSTERREICH' (AUSTRIAN REPUBLIC) is inscribed at the bottom right in semi-circle. The coin's outer ring depicts the 12 stars of the European flag.
	Luxembourg	150 years since the Constitution of Luxembourg	316,000 coins	27 December 2017
The design shows on the left hand the effigy of His Royal Highness, the Grand-Duke Henri, looking to the right. At the right hand of the design are depicted the year-dates '1868–2018' as well as the text '150 ans'. Below the effigy of the Grand-Duke appear the text 'Constitution du Grand-Duché de Luxembourg' and a lateral cut view of an open booklet. The coin's outer ring depicts the 12 stars of the European flag.
	Italy	70 years since the Constitution of Italy	4 million coins	2 January 2018
Enrico De Nicola, provisional Head of State, signs the act of promulgation of the Constitution of the Italian Republic on 27 December 1947; on his right, the Head of Government Alcide De Gasperi, on the left, Umberto Terracini, President of the Italian Constituent Assembly. Above, the inscription 'COSTITUZIONE' and the monogram of the Italian Republic 'RI'; in exergue, the inscription 'CON SICURA COSCIENZA', 'R', the mintmark of the Mint of Rome, and the dates '1948 • 2018', respectively year of the coming into force of the Italian Constitution and year of the issue of the coin. The coin's outer ring depicts the 12 stars of the European flag.
	Slovakia	25th anniversary of the establishment of the Slovak Republic	1 million coins	3 January 2018
The design symbolises Slovakia's entry into the European Union and the euro area by showing a stylised portal arching over both a map of Slovakia and a euro symbol surrounded by the European Union stars, some covered by the map. The Slovak coat of arms appears on the left of the design. At the lower left side, in semi-circle is the name of the issuing country 'SLOVENSKÁ REPUBLIKA'. The date of the country's establishment '1.1.1993' and the year of issuance '2018' appear, one above the other, below the right side of the map. Between the map and the date are the mint mark of the Kremnica Mint (Mincovňa Kremnica), consisting of the initials 'MK' placed between two dies, and the stylised letters 'PK', the initials of the designer, Pavel Károly. The coin's outer ring depicts the 12 stars of the European flag.
	Germany	100 years since the birth of Helmut Schmidt	30 million coins	30 January 2018
The design portrays Helmut Schmidt in a characteristic pose as he engages in dialogue with his interlocutor. In semi-circle at the top right the inscription 'HELMUT SCHMIDT' and at the right side the years '1918–2015'. The mint mark of the respective mint appears underneath the years. At the left side is the code of the issuing country 'D' and underneath is the year of issuance '2018'. At the bottom there are the initials of the artist. The coin's outer ring depicts the 12 stars of the European flag.
	Germany	Charlottenburg Palace in Berlin; Thirteenth of the Bundesländer I series	30 million coins	30 January 2018
The design shows the main building of the Charlottenburg Palace from the side of the Cour d' Honneur. The inner part also features the name 'BERLIN' and the mint mark of the respective mint ('A', 'D', 'F', 'G' or 'J') at the bottom, the issuing country's country code 'D' right at the top, the year '2018' left at the top and the engraver's mark left at the bottom. The coin's outer ring depicts the 12 stars of the European flag.
	Estonia	100 years since independence Joint issue with Latvia and Lithuania	500,000 coins	31 January 2018
The three Baltic States are symbolically represented as a braid. They are united by their history: a common past, present and future. A stylised numeral representing the 100th anniversary, and the heraldic signs of all three States, are featured as well. At the left side is the name of the issuing country 'EESTI' and at the right side is the year of issuance '2018'. The design was selected by public voting in all three Baltic countries. The coin's outer ring depicts the 12 stars of the European flag.
	Latvia	100 years since independence Joint issue with Estonia and Lithuania	512,000 coins	31 January 2018
The three baltic States are symbolically represented as a braid. They are united by their history: a common past, present and future. A stylized numeral representing the 100th anniversary, and the heraldic signs of all three States, are featured as well. At the left side is the name of the issuing country 'LATVIJA' and at the right side is the year of issuance '2018'. The design was selected by public voting in all three Baltic countries. The coin's outer ring depicts the 12 stars of the European flag.
	Lithuania	100 years since independence Joint issue with Estonia and Latvia	1 million coins	31 January 2018
The three Baltic States are symbolically represented as a braid. They are united by their history: a common past, present and future. A stylised numeral representing the 100th anniversary, and the heraldic signs of all three States, are featured as well. At the left side is the name of the issuing country 'LIETUVA' and the mint mark and at the right side is the year of issuance '2018' and the mark of the designer 'JP'. The design was selected by public voting in all three Baltic countries. The coin's outer ring depicts the 12 stars of the European flag.
	Spain	50 years since the birth of Felipe VI of Spain	400,000 coins	2 February 2018
The design reproduces King Felipe VI's coat of arms. On the left hand side, in semi-circle, is the word 'ESPAÑA' and below the year of issuance 2018. At the bottom right, in semi-circle, is the inscription '50 ANIVERSARIO DE S.M. FELIPE VI'. The mint mark is represented at the top right. The coin's outer ring depicts the 12 stars of the European flag.
	Spain	Old town of Santiago de Compostela; Ninth of the UNESCO World Heritage Sites series	300,000 coins	2 February 2018
The City of Santiago de Compostela was declared World Cultural Heritage by UNESCO in 1985, considering its urban beauty and monumental integrity added to the deep echoes of its spiritual and cultural significance of the Middle Ages: the Camino de Santiago Pilgrimage. The Camino de Santiago (The Way of St. James) is a large network of ancient pilgrim routes stretching across Europe and coming together at the tomb of St. James in Santiago de Compostela in north-west Spain. The design reproduces the sculpture of Santiago as a central figure in the canvas of the Puerta Santa of Santiago de Compostela Cathedral. On the left hand side, in semi-circle, is the word "ESPAÑA", at the bottom left the year of issuance "2018" and underneath the mint mark. The coin's outer ring depicts the 12 stars of the European flag.
	Estonia	100 years since independence	1,317,800 coins	19 February 2018
The design depicts simultaneously the numbers 18 and 100, which symbolize the time when Estonia became an independent country and furthermore reflect the past hundred years. At the bottom right is the text 'SADA AASTAT EESTI VABARIIKI' and next to it the name of the country 'EESTI' and the year of issuance '2018'. The coin's outer ring depicts the 12 stars of the European flag.
	France	Bleuet de France	10,020,000 coins	19 February 2018
For 100 years, the cornflower (Bleuet de France) has been the flower of remembrance and solidarity in France. It started as a means of helping injured veterans of the First World War, but before long had been adopted by the whole French nation as a symbol of gratitude for the sacrifices the soldiers had made to defend their country and their ideals. Today, as in the past, the cornflower still provides moral and financial support to veterans and victims of wars past and present and to victims of terrorism. It also helps pass on to young people standards and values such as respect, peace and tolerance. This flower of remembrance honours all those who fought and are still fighting for our freedom today. The design features the cornflower in the centre of the coin. It is surrounded by the words 'Le Bleuet de France, fleur de mémoire et de solidarité' (Bleuet of France, flower of remembrance and solidarity). The dates '1918–2018' as well as the letters RF for République Française (French Republic) and the mint marks are also included in the design. The coin's outer ring depicts the 12 stars of the European flag.
	Italy	60 years since the formation of the Ministry of Health	3 million coins	5 March 2018
The design shows an allegorical representation of Health with some symbols of the activities of the Ministry: Environment, Research, Nutrition and Medicine. On the left the logo 'RI', acronym of the Italian Republic; above the mintmark of the Mint of Rome 'R'; at the base of the female figure the initials of the author Silvia Petrassi. From left to right, in semi-circle, the inscription 'MINISTERO DELLA SALUTE' and the dates '1958–2018'. The coin's outer ring depicts the 12 stars of the European flag.
	San Marino	500 years since the birth of Tintoretto	60,500 coins	5 April 2018
The centre of the coin depicts a detail from Tintoretto's painting 'The Visitation' (the embrace between the Virgin Mary and Elizabeth), and the dates '1518–2018'; at the edge: 'SAN MARINO' written above, and 'Tintoretto' below; on the left are the initials of the artist Luciana de Simoni 'LDS' and the letter 'R' identifying the Mint of Rome. The coin's outer ring depicts the 12 stars of the European flag.
	Andorra	25th anniversary of the Andorran Constitution	75,000 coins	12 April 2018
The design depicts the 'Monument to the Men and Women of Andorra who launched the Constitution', which stands in the square of the Consell General (Andorra's Parliament). This monument shows the silhouettes of a man and a woman and commemorates the will expressed by the Andorran citizenry, in the referendum held on 14 March 1993, to become a constitutional state, democratic and social, as expressed in article 1 of the Constitution. To the right of the monument there is the map of Andorra with the Latin inscription 'VIRTVS VNITA FORTIOR' (virtue united is stronger) inside, which is the state motto of the Principality of Andorra. Surrounding the design there are the inscriptions '25è ANIVERSARI DE LA CONSTITUCIÓ 1993–2018' (25th anniversary of the Constitution 1993–2018) and the name of the country 'ANDORRA'. The coin's outer ring depicts the 12 stars of the European flag.
	Slovenia	World Bees Day	1 million coins	14 May 2018
In the middle of the inner ring of the coin is the image of honeycomb in a form of a globe, which shows the eastern hemisphere. Around the honeycomb on the left upper side is the inscription 'SVETOVNI DAN ČEBEL', and on the lower right side the inscription 'SLOVENIJA 2018'. The coin's outer ring depicts the 12 stars of the European flag.
	Portugal	250 years since the foundation of the Imprensa Nacional Casa da Moeda	520,000 coins	22 May 2018
The design displays the inscription '1768–2018 IMPRENSA NACIONAL DUZENTOS E CINQUENTA 250 ANOS PORTUGAL MMXVIII' as if the letters and numbers were books displayed in a library. At the bottom of the inner ring there is the name of the artist 'Eduardo Aires' at the left side and the mintmark 'INCM' at the right side. The Official Printing Works are responsible with the publication of the Portuguese Official Journal containing all the legislative activity of the country, books of the highest cultural relevance, and other cultural activities. The coin's outer ring depicts the 12 stars of the European flag.
	Finland	Koli National Park	1 million coins	28 May 2018
The design shows a drawing from the top of the Finnish national landscape Koli. The year of issuance '2018' is placed at the center bottom. The indication of the issuing country 'FI' is at the center left and the mint mark at the center right. The coin's outer ring depicts the 12 stars of the European flag.
	Vatican City	European Year of Cultural Heritage	86,000 coins	1 June 2018
The design features the Statue of Laocoön and His Sons, also called the Laocoön Group, a fundamental work of the world sculpture, foundational for the Vatican Museums. At the center bottom, the inscription of the issuing country 'Città del VATICANO'. From left to right, in semi-circle, the inscription 'ANNO EUROPEO DEL PATRIMONIO CULTURALE'. At the top right the year of issuance '2018' and the mintmark 'R'. At the bottom right the name of the artist 'D. LONGO'. The coin's outer ring depicts the 12 stars of the European flag.
	Belgium	50th anniversary of May 1968 events in Belgium	257,500 coins	19 June 2018
The design represents students with a pamphlet and flag in their hands and refers to student demonstrations that took place in Belgium in connection with the sociocultural changes of May 1968. It was an important national event that shaped Belgium's national politics and influenced subsequent Government reforms, now 50 years ago. The mintmark of Utrecht (the Mercury's wand) is located on the left together with the Belgian mint master mark (the coat of arms of the municipality Herzele). The year mark 2018 and the country code BE are located at the left as well, just like the initials LL of the designer of the coin, Mr Luc Luycx. An auditorium marks the back, which is a reference to students. The coin's outer ring depicts the 12 stars of the European flag.
	Malta	Mnajdra; Third of the Maltese Prehistoric Sites series	335,000 coins	21 June 2018
The design features the Maltese prehistoric temples of Mnajdra, a Unesco World Heritage Site. Mnajdra is a prehistoric site consisting of three temples nestled around an oval forecourt. It is situated on the Southern coast of Malta, some 500 meters away from Hagar Qim. Mnajdra is best known for its astronomical alignments and the South temple seems to have been constructed to mark the sunrise on the equinox and the solstice. The Oldest parts of this complex date around 3 600–3 200 BC. At the top right of the design there are the inscriptions 'MNAJDRA', 'TEMPLES' and the years '3 600–2 500 BC', one underneath the other. At the bottom left there is the name of the issuing country 'MALTA' and underneath there is the year of issuance '2018'. The coin's outer ring depicts the 12 stars of the European flag.
	Monaco	250 years since the birth of François Joseph Bosio	16,000 coins	25 June 2018
The design shows Mr BOSIO and a statue as the background image. The inscription 'MONACO' is at the top of the image in semi-circle. At the bottom, in semi-circle as well, there are two inscriptions: 'FRANÇOIS JOSEPH BOSIO' and underneath '1768 – SCULPTEUR – 2018'. At the left and right sides of these two inscriptions, there are the mintmark and the mint master mark. The coin's outer ring depicts the 12 stars of the European flag.
	Lithuania	Lithuania's Independence Centenary Song Celebration	500,000 coins	26 June 2018
The design features stylised figures of people and birds, typical of one of the Lithuanian folk art genres — paper cuttings, symbolic of folk dance and song. The inscription of the issuing country 'LIETUVA' is at the center bottom, the year of issuance '2018' is at the left hand side and the mark of the Lithuanian Mint is at the right hand side. The coin's outer ring depicts the 12 stars of the European flag.
	France	Simone Veil	15 million coins	26 June 2018
The design displays a portrait of Simone Veil, an icon in the combat for women's rights. Simone Veil, born Jacob, left us in June 2017 at the age of 89. After surviving deportation to Auschwitz, she went on to become one of the most important actors in Europe's building. Her deportation registration number appears on her collar. The background depicts the European Parliament on which her name, key dates, indication of the country 'RF', year of issuance '2018' and the mintmarks are inscribed. The coin's outer ring depicts the 12 stars of the European flag.
	Portugal	250 years since the foundation of Ajuda Botanical Garden	520,000 coins	25 July 2018
The design shows a very old Dracaena tree that is in the Ajuda Botanical Garden premises and is a symbol of the garden. At the top of the design, from left to right, in semi-circle, there is the inscription '250 ANOS JARDIM BOTÂNICO DA AJUDA'. At the bottom, from left to right, in semi-circle, there is the inscription 'PORTUGAL 2018'. Right underneath the image of the trees, at the left side, there are the initials of the artist 'J. FAZENDA' and at the right side the mintmark 'INCM'. The coin's outer ring depicts the 12 stars of the European flag.
	Luxembourg	175 years since the death of Grand Duke William I	311,000 coins	26 August 2018
The design shows on the right hand the effigy of His Royal Highness, the Grand Duke Henri, looking to the left and on the left hand the effigy of HRH the Grand Duke Guillaume Ist. Between both effigies are depicted vertically the year-dates '1772–1843' as well as the name 'Guillaume Ier'. At the bottom appears the text 'LUXEMBOURG' and the year-date '2018'. The coin's outer ring depicts the 12 stars of the European flag.
	San Marino	420 years since the birth of Gian Lorenzo Bernini	63,100 coins	20 September 2018
The centre of the coin features a detail from Bernini's sculpture 'Bust of Costanza Bonarelli', and the dates '1598–2018'; at the edge, on the left is the inscription 'SAN MARINO', on the right the inscription 'BERNINI', the letter 'R' identifying the Mint of Rome and the initials of the artist Annalisa Masini 'A.M.'. The coin's outer ring depicts the 12 stars of the European flag.
	Belgium	50 years since the launch of European satellite ESRO 2B	257,500 coins	20 September 2018
The design shows the ESRO 2B satellite, the first successful satellite of the European Space Research Organization and launched in May 1968, circling around planet Earth. The mintmark of Utrecht (the Mercury's wand) is located on the bottom together with the Belgian mint master mark, the coat of arms of the municipality Herzele, the country code BE and the initials LL referring to the designer of the coin, Mr Luc Luycx. The coin's outer ring depicts the 12 stars of the European flag.
	Latvia	Zemgale; Fourth of the Latvian Historical Regions series	507,000 coins	26 September 2018
The design shows the coat of arms of the region of Zemgale. At the top, the name of the issuing country 'LATVIJA' and at the bottom the inscription 'ZEMGALE'. At the right hand side, the year of issuance '2018'. The coin's outer ring depicts the 12 stars of the European flag.
	Vatican City	50 years since the death of Padre Pio	94,000 coins	4 October 2018
The design features the right profile of a portrait of Padre Pio. At the top, from left to right, in semi-circle is the inscription of the issuing country 'CITTÀ DEL VATICANO'. At the bottom is the inscription 'Padre Pio' and at its right the mint mark 'R'. At the left hand of the design is the year '1968' and at the right is the year of issuance '2018'. At the bottom left is the name of the artist 'P.DANIELE'. The coin's outer ring depicts the 12 stars of the European flag.
	Finland	Finnish Sauna culture	1 million coins	22 October 2018
The design shows a Finnish landscape with a typical Finnish lakeside sauna placed in the centre. The year of issuance '2018' is placed at the centre bottom. The indication of the issuing country 'FI' is at the centre left and the mint mark at the centre right. The coin's outer ring depicts the 12 stars of the European flag.
	Greece	70th anniversary of the union of the Dodecanese with Greece	750,000 coins	25 October 2018
The design features in the central part a rose, the canting badge of Rhodes, inspired from a coin minted by the ancient city of Rhodes, one of the most characteristic coins of the Dodecanese, with stylised waves fanning out from the centre. Inscribed along the inner edge is the wording '1948–2018 THE UNION OF THE DODECANESE WITH GREECE' and 'HELLENIC REPUBLIC' (in Greek). Also visible at left is a palmette (the mintmark of the Greek mint) and, at right, the monogram of the artist (George Stamatopoulos). The coin's outer ring depicts the 12 stars of the European flag.
	Greece	75 years since the death of Kostis Palamas	750,000 coins	25 October 2018
The design features a portrait of the Greek poet Kostis Palamas (1859–1943). Inscribed along the inner edge at left is the wording 'HELLENIC REPUBLIC' and the name 'KOSTIS PALAMAS' (in Greek). Also inscribed is a palmette (the mintmark of the Greek Mint) and the year of issuance '2018'. Visible at the lower right is the monogram of the artist (George Stamatopoulos). The coin's outer ring depicts the 12 stars of the European flag.
	Malta	Cultural heritage Third of the From Children in Solidarity series	320,000 coins	7 November 2018
The design was created by a school student and depicts a variety of themes intrinsic to Maltese heritage including: an allusion to the prehistoric temples, which are the world's oldest free-standing structures, a church dome and spire, which is a characteristic feature of the Maltese town and village skyline and a representation of a traditional Maltese boat carrying a Maltese flag. The name of the issuing country 'Malta' is at the top of the inner circle of the coin and the year '2018' at the bottom. The coin's outer ring depicts the 12 stars of the European flag.
	Andorra	70th anniversary of the Universal Declaration of Human Rights	75,000 coins	26 November 2018
The design of the coin depicts seven staircases (representing the seven parishes or administrative divisions of Andorra) in the shape of mountains that lead to the valley, where there is the name of the issuing country 'ANDORRA' and the year of issue '2018'. These staircases are, at the same time, the branches of a tree symbolizing humankind, of which Andorra is an integral part. 30 leaves come out of the branches of this tree representing the 30 articles of the Universal Declaration of Human Rights. The Catalan inscription '70 ANYS DE LA DECLARACIÓ UNIVERSAL DELS DRETS HUMANS' (70 years of the Universal Declaration of Human Rights) surrounds the design, strengthening this commemorative event. The coin's outer ring depicts the 12 stars of the European flag.

=== 2019 coinage ===
Image	Country	Feature	Volume	Date
	Luxembourg	100th anniversary of Grand Duchess Charlotte's accession to the throne	306,000 coins	27 December 2018
The design shows on the left hand the effigy of His Royal Highness, the Grand Duke Henri, and on the right hand the effigy of the Grand Duchess Charlotte. At the bottom is the name of the issuing country 'LUXEMBOURG' and underneath the year of issuance '2019'. At the top, in semi-circle around the effigies is the inscription 'Centenaire de l'accession au trône de la Grande-Duchesse Charlotte' (Centenary of the accession to the throne of Grand Duchess Charlotte). The coin's outer ring depicts the 12 stars of the European flag.
	Ireland	Centenary of the first sitting of Dáil Éireann	1 million coins	21 January 2019
The design depicts the first sitting of Dáil Éireann in the Round Room. The large Round Room of the Mansion House arcs above the vast congregation of the nation's first elected Dáil. The words 'An Chéad Dáil', at the centre of the design, together with the year '1919' at the top, are inscribed in a traditional uncial font. At the bottom are inscribed the name of the country and the year of issuance 'ÉIRE 2019'. The coin's outer ring depicts the 12 stars of the European flag.
	Belgium	450 years since the death of Pieter Bruegel the Elder	155,000 coins	24 January 2019
The inner part of the piece depicts the portrait of the famous Belgian artist Pieter Bruegel the Elder, together with a painting on an easel. Above this, you can find the name P. Bruegel, the years 1569, with a subtle obelisk referring to the year of death, and 2019, the year of issuance. As the Royal Dutch Mint will strike the coins, the mintmark of Utrecht, a mercury staff is located on the left together with the Belgian mint director mintmark, the coat of arms of the municipality Herzele, the country code BE. The initials LL referring to the designer of the coin, Mr Luc Luycx, are located on the right. Finally, around the edge of the inner part small dots form a circle. The coin's outer ring depicts the 12 stars of the European flag.
	Italy	500 years since the death of Leonardo da Vinci	3 million coins	25 January 2019
The design shows a detail of the painting 'Dama con l'ermellino' (Lady with an Ermine) by Leonardo da Vinci (Czartoryski Museum in Krakow). On the left, the inscription 'Leonardo', the initials of the author Maria Angela Cassol 'MAC' and the logo 'RI' acronym of the Italian Republic; on the right, 'R', mintmark of the Mint of Rome and the dates '1519–2019', respectively the year of Leonardo's death and the year of the coin issuance. The coin's outer ring depicts the 12 stars of the European flag.
	Germany	70 years since the constitution of the Federal Council; The Bundesländer I series was interrupted in 2019 and this coin was issued instead.	30,507,300 coins	29 January 2019
The design shows a highly detailed and finely sculpted rendering of the Bundesrat building. The upper half of the coin's inner section includes the mint mark of the respective mint ('A', 'D', 'F', 'G' or 'J'), the artist's initials and the year '2019'. The lower half of the coin's inner section contains the inscription 'BUNDESRAT' and Germany's issuing country code 'D'. The coin's outer ring depicts the 12 stars of the European flag.
	Spain	Old town of Ávila with its extra-muros churches Tenth of the UNESCO World Heritage Sites series	500,000 coins	1 February 2019
The city of Avila has preserved the auterity and purity of the mediaeval style, surrounded by the most complete walls of Spain. The design reproduces at the centre a detail of the Avila wall. At the top side circular ascending the word 'ESPANA', the year of issuance '2019' and the mint mark. The coin's outer ring depicts the 12 stars of the European flag.
	Andorra	2019 FIS Alpine Ski World Cup final	60,000 coins	11 March 2019
The 2019 Ski World Cup Finals will be held in the Principality of Andorra from 11 to 17 March 2019. With this event, the Principality of Andorra will host one of the most important alpine skiing competition in the world. For the Principality of Andorra, it will be the most prestigious winter sport event that has ever been held in the country, and will be a turning point in the country's trajectory as a sport destination. The design of the coin shows in the foreground a skier sliding down a slope. In the background, four curved lines, from the official logo of these Ski World Cup Finals, represent the slopes where the competition will take place. Some snowflakes complete the design together with the inscription 'FINALS DE LA COPA DEL MÓN D'ESQUÍ ANDORRA 2019' (Andorra 2019 Ski World Cup Finals). The coin's outer ring depicts the 12 stars of the European flag.
	San Marino	500 years since the death of Leonardo da Vinci	54,150 coins	4 April 2019
The centre of the coin depicts an angel painted by Leonardo da Vinci in 'The Baptism of Christ'; at the edge, on the left is the inscription 'SAN MARINO', on the right the inscription '1519 Leonardo 2019'; on the left are the initials of the artist Uliana Pernazza 'UP' and on the bottom right, the letter 'R' identifying the Mint of Rome. The coin's outer ring depicts the 12 stars of the European flag.
	Slovakia	100 years since the death of Milan Rastislav Štefánik	1 million coins	25 April 2019
The design features a portrait of Milan Rastislav Štefánik. To the left of the portrait are the dates of Štefánik's birth '1880' and death '1919', one above the other. At the left side of the inner part of the coin, in semi-circle, are the name 'MILAN RASTISLAV ŠTEFÁNIK' and the name of the issuing country 'SLOVENSKO'. The year of issuance '2019' is between the portrait and the right side. Below the year are the stylised letters 'PV', the initials of the designer, Peter Valach, and below them is the mint mark of the Kremnica Mint (Mincovňa Kremnica), consisting of the letters 'MK' placed between two dies. The coin's outer ring depicts the 12 stars of the European flag.
	Vatican City	90th anniversary of the Foundation of the Vatican City State	79,000 coins	7 May 2019
The design features a portrait of Pope Pius XI (Sovereign of the State in 1929) and the Lateran in Rome. At the top, from left to right, in semi-circle is the inscription of the issuing country 'STATO DELLA CITTÀ DEL VATICANO'. At the bottom are the years '1929' and '2019' and underneath the name of the artist 'FUSCO'. The coin's outer ring depicts the 12 stars of the European flag.
	Portugal	500 years since the circumnavigation of Magellan	770,000 coins	8 May 2019
The Spanish expedition to the East Indies began in 1519 and ended in 1522, resulting in the first circumnavigation of the Earth. The design depicts the effigy of Fernão De Magalhães. At the right side, in semicircle, is the inscription 'CIRCUM NAVEGAÇÃO' (circumnavigation) and underneath the inscription '1519 FERNÃO DE MAGALHÃES'. At the left side, in semicircle, is the year of issuance '2019' and the name of the issuing country 'PORTUGAL'. The coin's outer ring depicts the 12 stars of the European flag.
	Belgium	25 years since the creation of the European Monetary Institute	155,000 coins	9 May 2019
The inner part of the piece depicts the portrait Alexandre Lamfalussy, the first president of the EMI, on the right with his name below. On the left-hand side, the abbreviation EMI stands central with the year 1994 above, referring to date of the establishment of the Institute and the designation of Lamfalussy as its first president. Below 'EMI', several coins are depicted falling on each other with the inscription €, 'ECU' and 'BEF' from top to bottom. Given the fact that this is a Belgian issuance, we have chosen for 'BEF', the abbreviation of our former national currency. The purpose of this representation is to symbolise the transition of the national currencies to a European single currency, the euro as the EMI's main focus was on establishing the European System of Central Banks, including the ECB and the new currency On the upper part of the left side of the coin is an inscription 'European Monetary Institute'. As the Royal Dutch Mint will strike the coins, the mintmark of Utrecht, a mercury staff is located on the left with the Belgian mint director mintmark, the coat of arms of the municipality Herzele. The country code BE and the year mark 2019 are located on the bottom. The initials LL referring to the designer of the coin, Mr Luc Luycx, are inscribed on the right. The coin's outer ring depicts the 12 stars of the European flag.
	Malta	Ta' Ħaġrat Temples; Fourth of the Maltese Prehistoric Sites series	335,000 coins	13 May 2019
The design features Ta' Haġrat, a prehistoric temple located in Mġarr, a small village in the northwest of Malta. The temple consists of two structures the largest of which dates to around 3 600–3 200 BC. This temple has a monumental doorway, which is its most distinctive characteristic. The inscription 'TA'HAĠRAT TEMPLES 3600–3000 BC' appears at the top of the design. At the bottom are the name of the issuing country 'MALTA' and the year of issuance '2019'. The coin's outer ring depicts the 12 stars of the European flag.
	Estonia	150th anniversary of the first Estonian Song Festival	1 million coins	29 May 2019
The design is inspired by the Song Celebration procession, which moves like the waves on the sea with cheers of pride and joy and a panoply of national dress. The design unites music, national costumes, and the various sites of the great and powerful Song Celebration of the nation by the sea. The design also features the first notes of the Estonian national anthem and, at the bottom, the words 'Laulupidu 150' (Song Celebration 150). At the top is the year of issuance '2019' and underneath the name of the issuing country 'EESTI'. The coin's outer ring depicts the 12 stars of the European flag.
	Portugal	600 years since the discovery of Madeira and Porto Santo	770,000 coins	6 June 2019
The event, known as the first Portuguese territorial discovery, marked a historic milestone in the consolidation of Portugal as a maritime power and gave rise to the Portuguese Age of Discoveries (1418–1522). The design depicts the Madeira Archipelago and the island of Porto Santo. In semicircle are the inscriptions '600 anos do Descobrimento da Madeira e de Porto Santo' and 'PORTUGAL 2019'. The coin's outer ring depicts the 12 stars of the European flag.
	France	60 years since the creation of Asterix	310,000 coins	7 June 2019
For 60 years, Asterix has been a true icon of the French culture. Created in 1959 by scenarist René Goscinny and cartoonist Albert Uderzo, this character embodies the Frenchman with his smartness and sharpness through the Gallic identity. Apart from its artistic line, depicting contemporary society with humour has brought Asterix a great international fame for many years. Since its inception, it has been translated into all the languages of the European Union meeting a huge success. The reputation of Asterix is for example as strong in Germany as in France. It has also been very well established in the United Kingdom, the Netherlands, Spain, Portugal, Italy and Scandinavia for many years. Beyond the French icon, Asterix has become a true figure of the European 9th art. The design represents Asterix in profile wearing his famous winged helmet. He is surrounded by laurels and Roman inscriptions referring to his 60 years. At the top is the inscription 'ASTERIX' and underneath the indication of the issuing country 'RF' (standing for République Française). The year of issuance '2019' is inscribed at the bottom, together with the French mintmark and mintmaster mark. The coin's outer ring depicts the 12 stars of the European flag.
	Lithuania	Sutartinės, Lithuanian songs	500,000 coins	10 July 2019
The design features linear motifs, symbolising polyphonic melodies of the unique Lithuanian heritage — folk songs sutartinės. The lines are widening and narrowing again, spinning into a swirl decorated with various miniature geometric and nature figures. The inscription of the issuing country 'LIETUVA', as well as the inscription 'SUTARTINĖS' (Lithuanian multipart songs) and the year of issuance '2019' are depicted in semicircle. The mark of the Lithuanian Mint is featured as well. The coin's outer ring depicts the 12 stars of the European flag.
	Greece	100 years since the birth of Manolis Andronikos	750,000 coins	11 July 2019
Manolis Andronicos (1919–1992) was one of Greece's greatest archaeologists. His discovery of the royal tombs at Vergina in 1977 brought to light exquisite finds that attest to the splendour of ancient Macedonian civilisation. The design features a portrait of Manolis Andronicos. Inscribed along the inner edge at left is the name 'MANOLIS ANDRONICOS 1919–1992', along with the minting year and a palmette (mintmark of the Greek Mint); inscribed along the inner edge at right is the wording 'HELLENIC REPUBLIC'. Also visible at the right is the monogram of the artist (George Stamatopoulos). The coin's outer ring depicts the 12 stars of the European flag.
	Greece	150 years since the death of Andreas Kalvos	750,000 coins	11 July 2019
Born in Zante, Andreas Kalvos (1792–1869) is one of the most important modern Greek poets. Combining a solid neo-classicist education with the high ideals of Romanticism and archaicising with demotic Greek, he expressed both the revolutionary ideas of his time and his personal vision. The national side of the coin features a portrait of Andreas Kalvos. Inscribed along the inner edge at the left is the name 'ANDREAS KALVOS 1792–1869', along with the minting year and a palmette (mintmark of the Greek Mint); inscribed along the inner edge at the right is the wording 'HELLENIC REPUBLIC'. Also visible at the right is the monogram of the artist (George Stamatopoulos). The coin's outer ring depicts the 12 stars of the European flag.
	San Marino	550 years since the death of Filippo Lippi	54,150 coins	29 August 2019
The centre of the coin features the Madonna and Child, a detail from Filippo Lippi's 'Madonna and Child with Two Angels'; above are the inscriptions 'SAN MARINO' and 'FILIPPO LIPPI' and on the left are the year '1469' and the letter 'R' identifying the Mint of Rome. On the bottom left are the initials of the artist Maria Angela Cassol 'M.A.C.', and in the centre the year '2019'. The coin's outer ring depicts the 12 stars of the European flag.
	Lithuania	Samogitia; First of the Lithuanian Ethnographical Regions series	500,000 coins	10 September 2019
The design features a bear standing on its hind legs, with a chain collar on the neck. It has been depicted on the coat of arms of Samogitia since the 16th century. The bear is situated against a shield topped with a crown, which is held by an armoured soldier (a symbol of courage, sacrifice and patriotism) and a goddess with an anchor (a symbol of hope). Below is a Latin inscription 'PATRIA UNA' (one fatherland). The design is surrounded by the inscriptions 'LIETUVA' (Lithuania) and 'ŽEMAITIJA' (Samogitia), the year of issuance '2019' and the mintmark of the Lithuanian Mint. The coin's outer ring depicts the 12 stars of the European flag.
	Monaco	200th anniversary of Honoré's V accession to the throne	15,000 coins	12 September 2019
The design shows the effigy of Prince Honoré V. At the left is the inscription 'HONORÉ V' and at the right the name of the issuing country 'MONACO'. At the bottom, in semi-circle, is the inscription '1819 — Avènement — 2019'. The coin's outer ring depicts the 12 stars of the European flag.
	Latvia	Coat of arms of Latvia's rising sun	307,000 coins	17 September 2019
The coin is dedicated to the history of the Coat of arms of Latvia and features the motif of a rising sun. This motif was originally part of the design proposal for the symbol of the autonomous Latvia, created by artist Ansis Cīrulis in 1917. Later on this motif emerged as one of the basic elements of the Coat of arms of Latvia. The motif of a rising sun has also been used by artist Ansis Cīrulis before, in the design of the Latvian riflemen's badge and his other artworks. After the foundation of the Republic of Latvia in 1918 variations of the motif of a rising sun appeared in all design proposals for the Coat of arms of the new State. The Coat of arms of Latvia was officially adopted in 1921. The design shows the motif of the rising sun, with stylised letters B and L (an abbreviation from the words 'Brīvā Latvija' (Free Latvia)) in the centre. It also bears an inscription 'UZLECOŠĀ SAULE' (The rising sun), the name of the issuing country 'LATVIJA' and the year of issuance '2019'. The coin's outer ring depicts the 12 stars of the European flag.
	Luxembourg	100 years of Universal Suffrage in Luxembourg	308,500 coins	19 September 2019
The design shows on the left hand the effigy of His Royal Highness, the Grand Duke Henri, and on the right hand a ballot box where a ballot paper is being inserted by a hand. At the bottom is the name of the issuing country 'LUXEMBOURG'. At the top, in semi-circle form is the inscription 'Centenaire du suffrage universel' (Centenary of the universal franchise) and underneath the inscription '1919 – 2019', the latter being the year of issuance. The coin's outer ring depicts the 12 stars of the European flag.
	Vatican City	25 years since the restoration of the Sistine Chapel	84,000 coins	1 October 2019
The design features the Last Judgment in the Sistine Chapel. At the left, in semi-circle is the inscription of the issuing country 'CITTÀ DEL VATICANO'. At the right, in semi-circle, are the inscriptions 'CAPPELLA SISTINA — FINE DEI RESTAURI' and '1994–2019'. At the right side is the mintmark 'R' and at the bottom the name of the artist 'D. LONGO'. The coin's outer ring depicts the 12 stars of the European flag.
	France	30 years since the Fall of the Berlin Wall; Joint issue with Germany	15 million coins	10 October 2019
Thirty years ago, the Berlin Wall fell. Beyond the impact on German society, it was an event with global consequences. On 9 November 1989, this occasion marks the end of the cold war and announces an appeasement after several decades of international tensions. At the European level, it is the first step towards the reunification of one of the leading countries of the European Union. This major change was after materialised by the Moscow Treaty of which France was a signatory. The European Union welcomed then 16 million new citizens in just one year; almost the structural and economic effect of welcoming a new country! The design represents the Berlin Wall, opened in its centre, letting the doves (allegories of the international appeasement), and the jubilant crowd pass. In the background, the Brandenburg Gate, Berlin's symbol par excellence, is represented. The mention '30 years of the fall of the Berlin Wall/30 Jahre Mauerfall' is inscribed on one side of the wall. At the bottom of the design is the year of issuance '2019' and at its right the indication of the issuing country 'RF' (standing for République Française). The coin's outer ring depicts the 12 stars of the European flag.
	Germany	30 years since the Fall of the Berlin Wall; Joint issue with France	30,297,000 coins	10 October 2019
Thirty years ago, the Berlin Wall fell. Beyond the impact on German society, it was an event with global consequences. On 9 November 1989, this occasion marks the end of the cold war and announces an appeasement after several decades of international tensions. At the European level, it is the first step towards the reunification of one of the leading countries of the European Union. This major change was after materialised by the Moscow Treaty of which France was a signatory. The European Union welcomed then 16 million new citizens in just one year; almost the structural and economic effect of welcoming a new country! The design represents the Berlin Wall, opened in its centre, letting the doves (allegories of the international appeasement), and the jubilant crowd pass. In the background, the Brandenburg Gate, Berlin's symbol par excellence, is represented. The mention '30 Jahre Mauerfall' (30 years of the fall of the Berlin Wall) is inscribed on one side of the wall. At the bottom of the design is the year of issuance '2019' and at its right the indication of the issuing country 'D'. The coin's outer ring depicts the 12 stars of the European flag.
	Malta	Nature and Environment; Fourth of the From Children in Solidarity series	320,000 coins	21 October 2019
The design was created by a school student and depicts a fruit tree and a stylised representation of the sun. At the bottom left is the name of the issuing country 'MALTA' and underneath the year of issuance '2019'. The coin's outer ring depicts the 12 stars of the European flag.
	Finland	Constitution Act of 1919	500,000 coins	31 October 2019
The design shows three circular fields that are joined at the centre. The three fields represent the trias politica, separation of powers into three different branches: a legislative, an executive, and a judiciary power. The year of issuance '2019' is placed centre left. The indication of the issuing country 'FI' and the mint mark are placed bottom right. The coin's outer ring depicts the 12 stars of the European flag.
	Andorra	600 years since the constitution of the General Council of Andorra	60,000 coins	11 November 2019
The design commemorates the 600th anniversary of the creation of the Consell de la Terra (Council of the Land). It was a representative body created in 1419, predecessor of the Consell General (General Council), the parliament of Andorra. The design depicts the upper part of the entry portal of Casa de la Vall (the parliament's old seat), with the coat of arms of the country and a fragment of a window above it. Two compact groups of human faces on both sides of the design, as if they were stones of the building, mean the cohesion of Andorrans as a social community united in history, institutions and values. The inscription '600 ANYS DEL CONSELL DE LA TERRA' (600 years of the Council of the Land) at the top, and the name of the issuing country 'ANDORRA' and both year dates '1419' and '2019' in the middle of the number '600' below complete the design. The coin's outer ring depicts the 12 stars of the European flag.
	Estonia	100 years since the foundation of the Estonian language University of Tartu	1 million coins	19 November 2019
The coin will mark the centenary of the University of Tartu as being established as the first Estonian language university. It was founded in 1632 by Swedish King Gustav II Adolf and is one of the oldest universities in northern and eastern Europe. In 1919 it became the first Estonian language university. The design depicts a motif of the main building of the university. It also bears the inscriptions 'RAHVUSÜLIKOOL 100'(National University 100) and 'UNIVERSITAS TARTUENSIS', the year '1632', the issuing country 'EESTI' and the year of issuance '2019'. The coin's outer ring depicts the 12 stars of the European flag.
	Slovenia	100 years since the foundation of the University of Ljubljana	1 million coins	25 November 2019
The University of Ljubljana's logo is the core of the design. On the left side the university's façade above the solid square of its logo is replaced with the inscription '100 LET UNIVERZE V LJUBLJANI'. The design's background is textured in order to achieve a larger impact of the inscription with the solid square. On the lower part of the right side is the inscription 'SLOVENIJA 2019'. The coin's outer ring depicts the 12 stars of the European flag.
