= Tal-Qadi Temple =

Megalithic temple in Malta

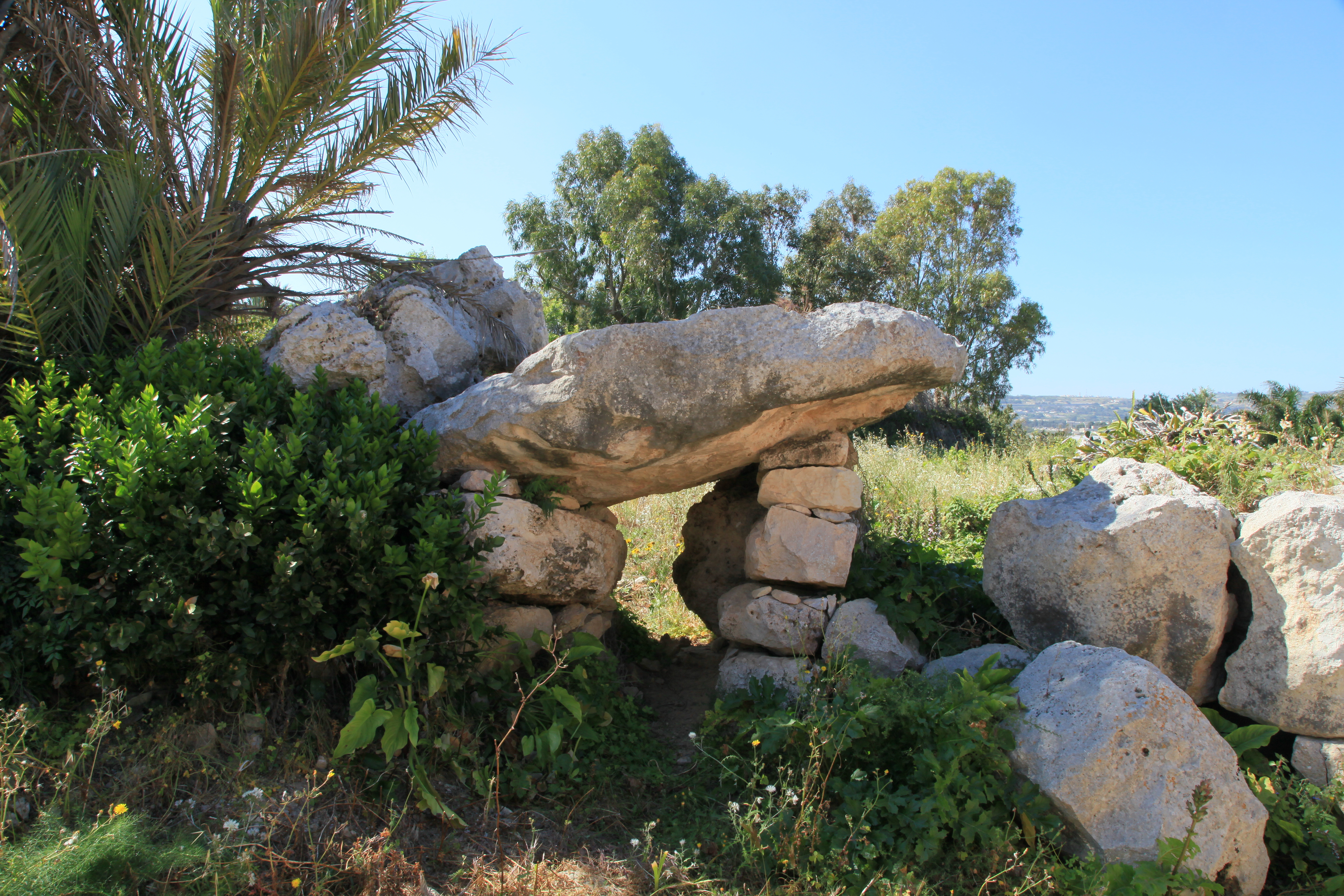
- The temple in 2014

- Location in Malta
- 35°56′11.96″N 14°25′13.74″E
- Type: Temple
- Periods: Tarxien phase Tarxien Cemetery phase
- Location: Naxxar, Northern Region, Malta
- Part of: Megalithic Temples of Malta

History
- Built: c. 3150 BC

Site notes
- Material: Limestone
- Excavation dates: 1927–1952
- Archaeologists: Themistocles Zammit; L. Upton Way
- Discovered: 1916 by Henry Sant
- Condition: Poorly preserved ruins
- Owner: Government of Malta
- Public access: Yes

The Tal-Qadi Temple is a megalithic temple in Salina, limits of Naxxar, Malta. It is in a very bad state of preservation, with only the temple's general outline still visible.

== Site ==
The site of Tal-Qadi was possibly in use around 4000 BC during the Ġgantija phase of Maltese prehistory, but the temple itself was built during the Tarxien phase between 3300 and 3000 BC. The temple continued to be used during the Tarxien Cemetery phase, since pottery shards from that era have been found.

Tal-Qadi is the only temple in Malta which is orientated to the north-east. Most other temples face the south or south-east, but in the case of Tal-Qadi, this would not have been possible since there is a steep slope in that direction.

Today, the temple is in poor condition, with few remains visible apart from its general outline. The remains of a central area and two apses can still be seen. The temple probably contained another two apses, giving it a four-apse shape which was typical of the late temple period. No traces of the temple's façade exist.

== Excavation and recent history ==
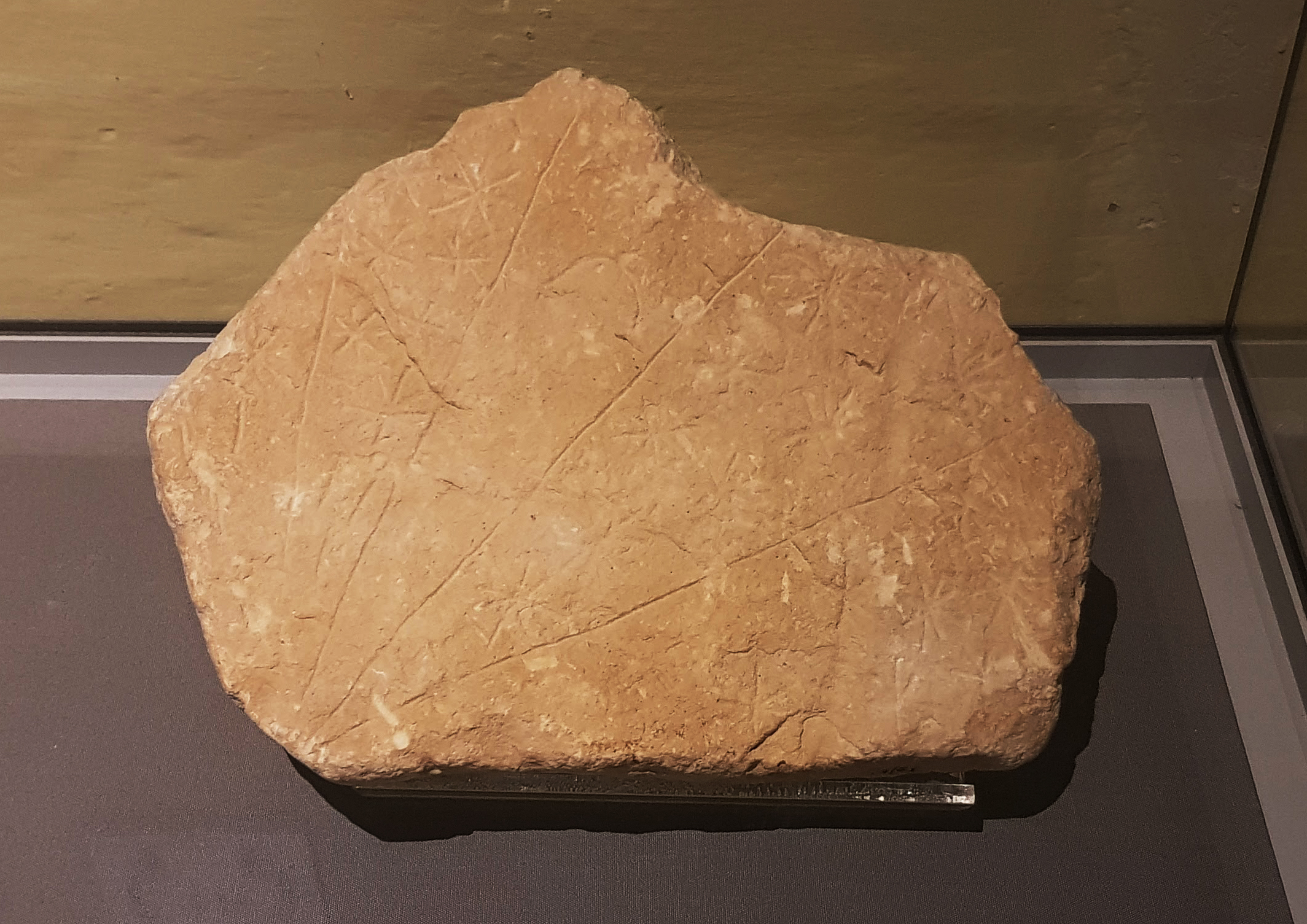
The tablet at the Archeology Museum

The scattered remains of the temple, spread out on an upper and a lower field, were discovered by Henry Sant, a government civil engineer, in 1916. The area was excavated in 1927 by Themistocles Zammit and L. Upton Way. According to Zammit, years before the identification of the temple, the tenant of the site had destroyed a group of upright stones. These might have been the remains of the temple's missing façade or its outer casing.

The remains of the temple were surveyed and mapped in 1952.

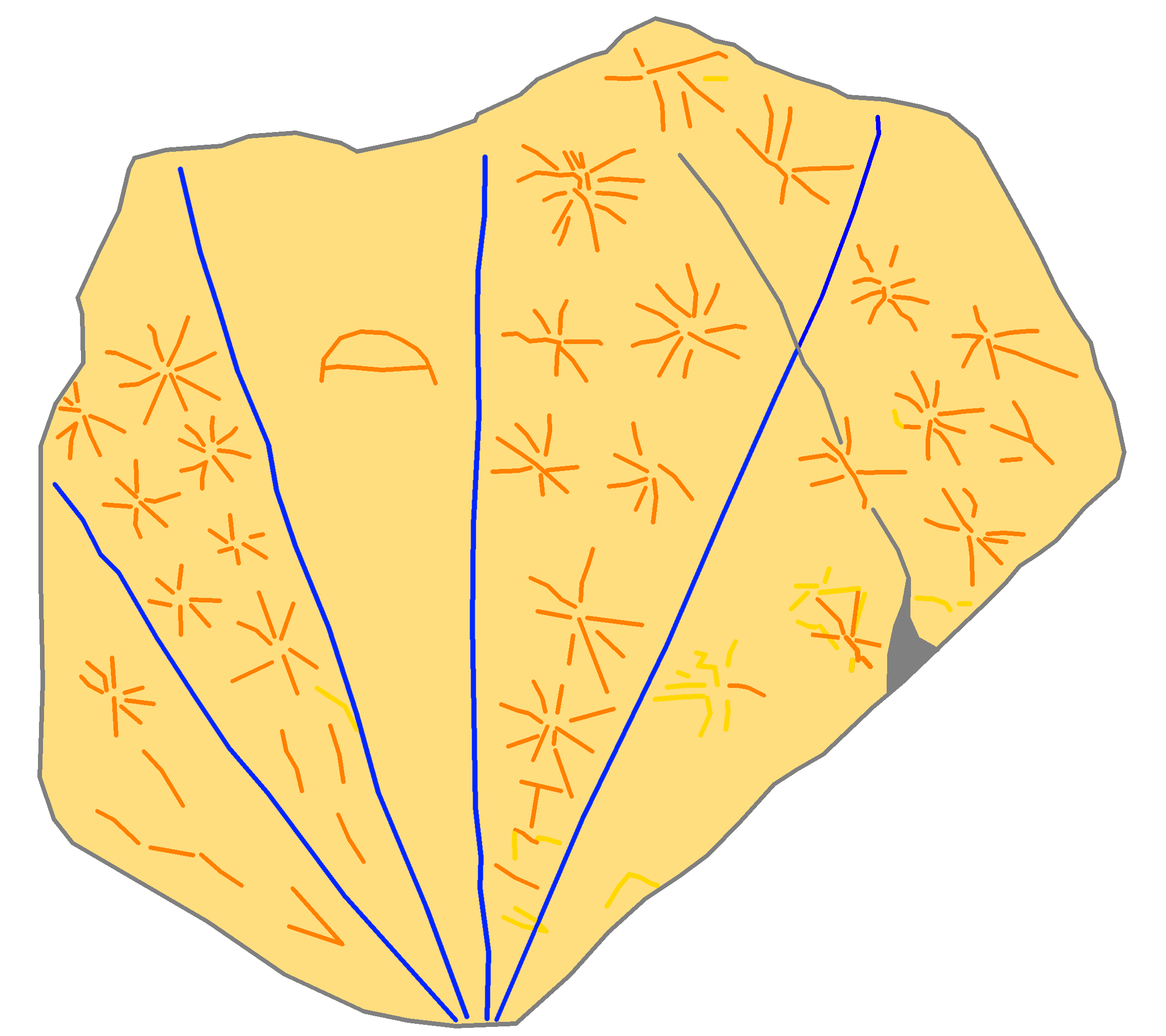
Sketch of the sky tablet of Tal-Qadi after

During the early excavations, a broken globigerina limestone slab showing five sections separated by lines, and incised with star-like figures and a crescent shape in the middle was found. This slab possibly was a star map or a moon calendar. It is now located in the National Museum of Archaeology in Valletta.

The following pictures explain how the sky tablet of Tal-Qadi can be used in order to measure the ecliptic latitude of The Moon or the planets that always apparently move along the arc of the ecliptic:

Application of the sky tablet of Tal-Qadi for the measurement of the ecliptic latitude of Venus

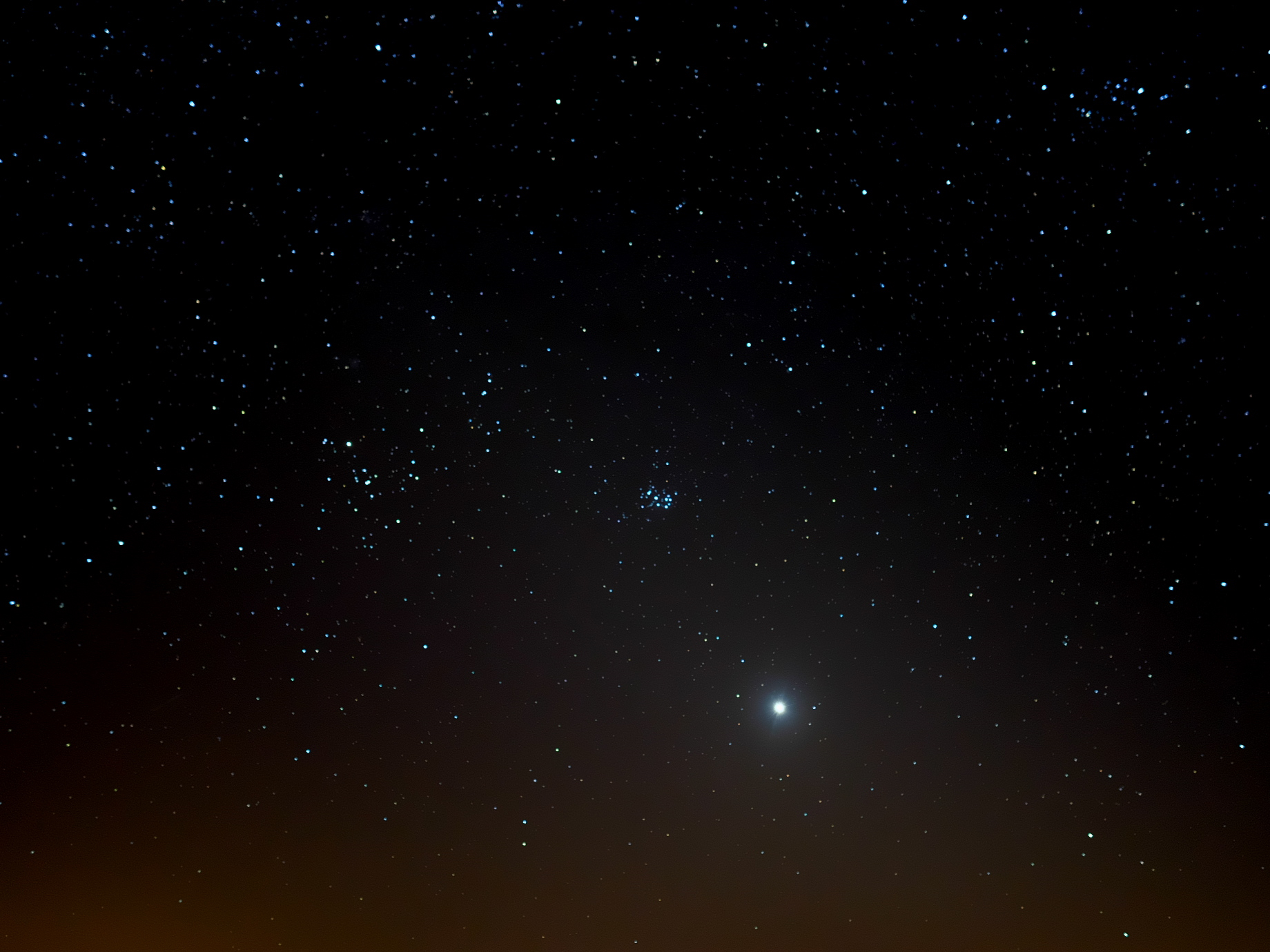
The bright Venus in the cone of the zodiacal light 8 degrees above the western horizon on 23 March 2020. This was eleven days before Venus approached the Golden Gate of the Ecliptic (centre) between the Pleiades (right) and the Hyades together with Aldebaran (left) in the constellation Taurus (centre).

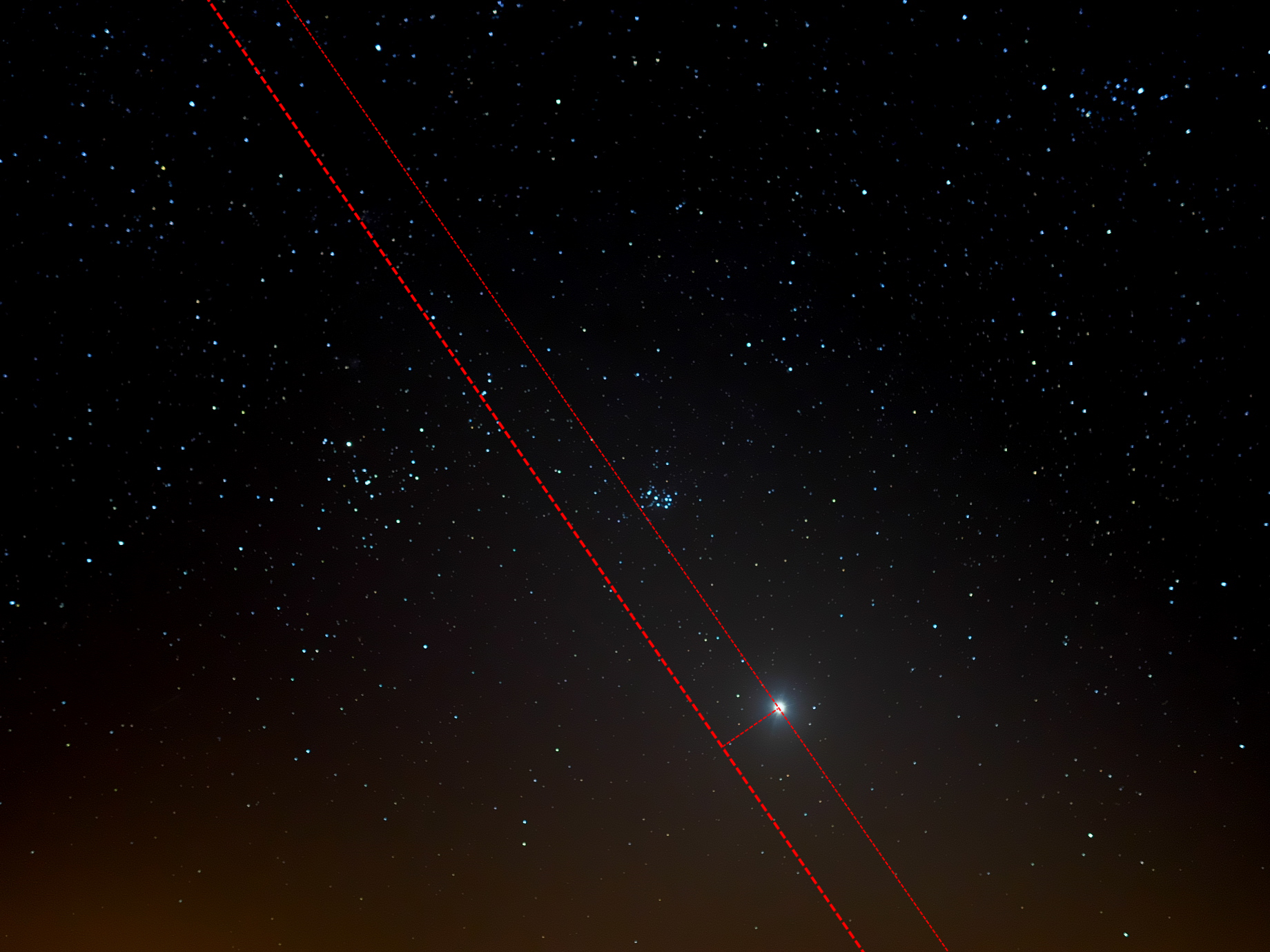
The ecliptic latitude of Venus (thin red dashed line), i.e. her distance from the ecliptic (thick red dashed line), is 3.0 degrees.

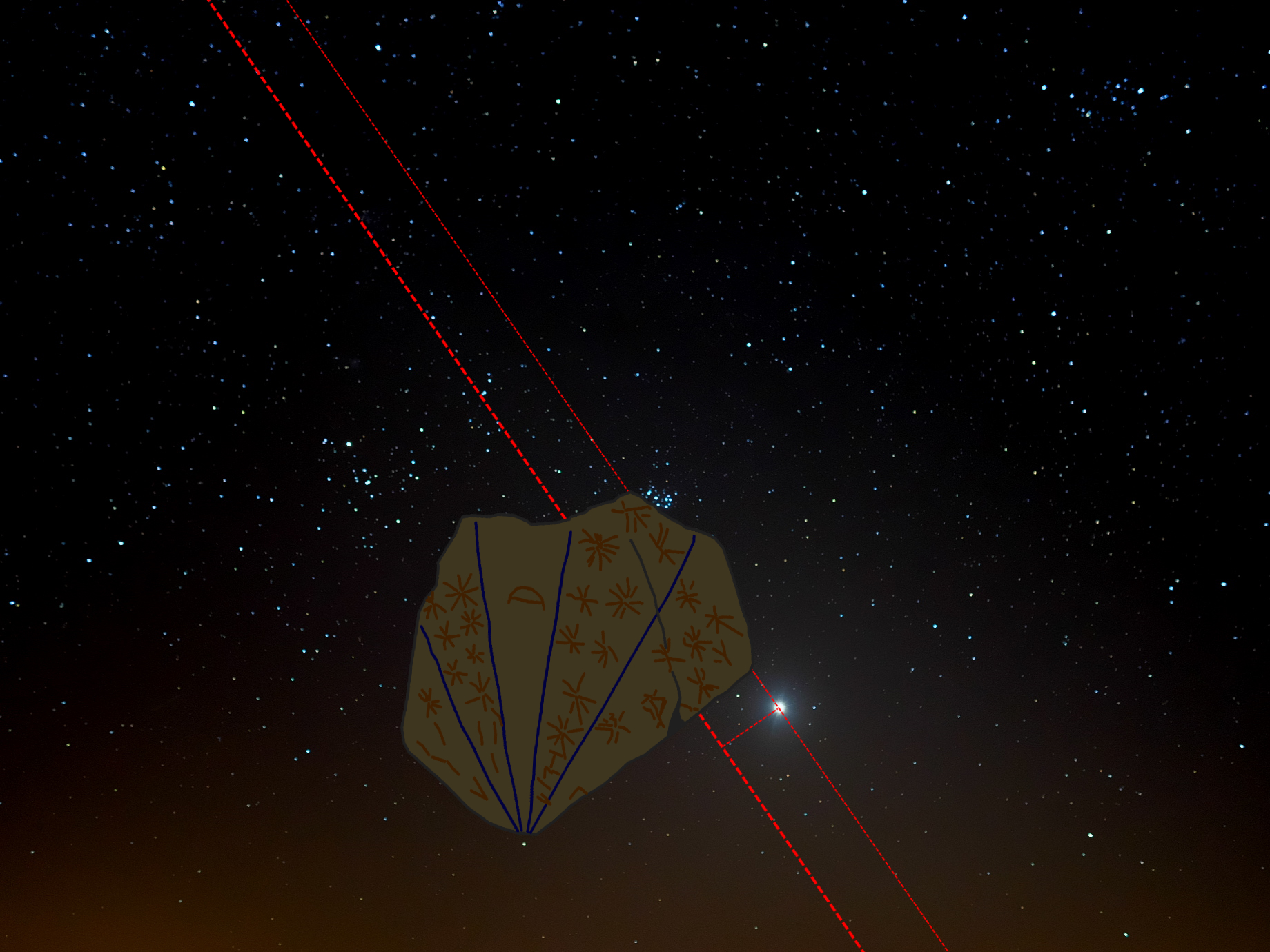
Measurement of the ecliptic latitude along the long straight edge of the tablet that was aligned to the fixed stars displayed on the sky tablet

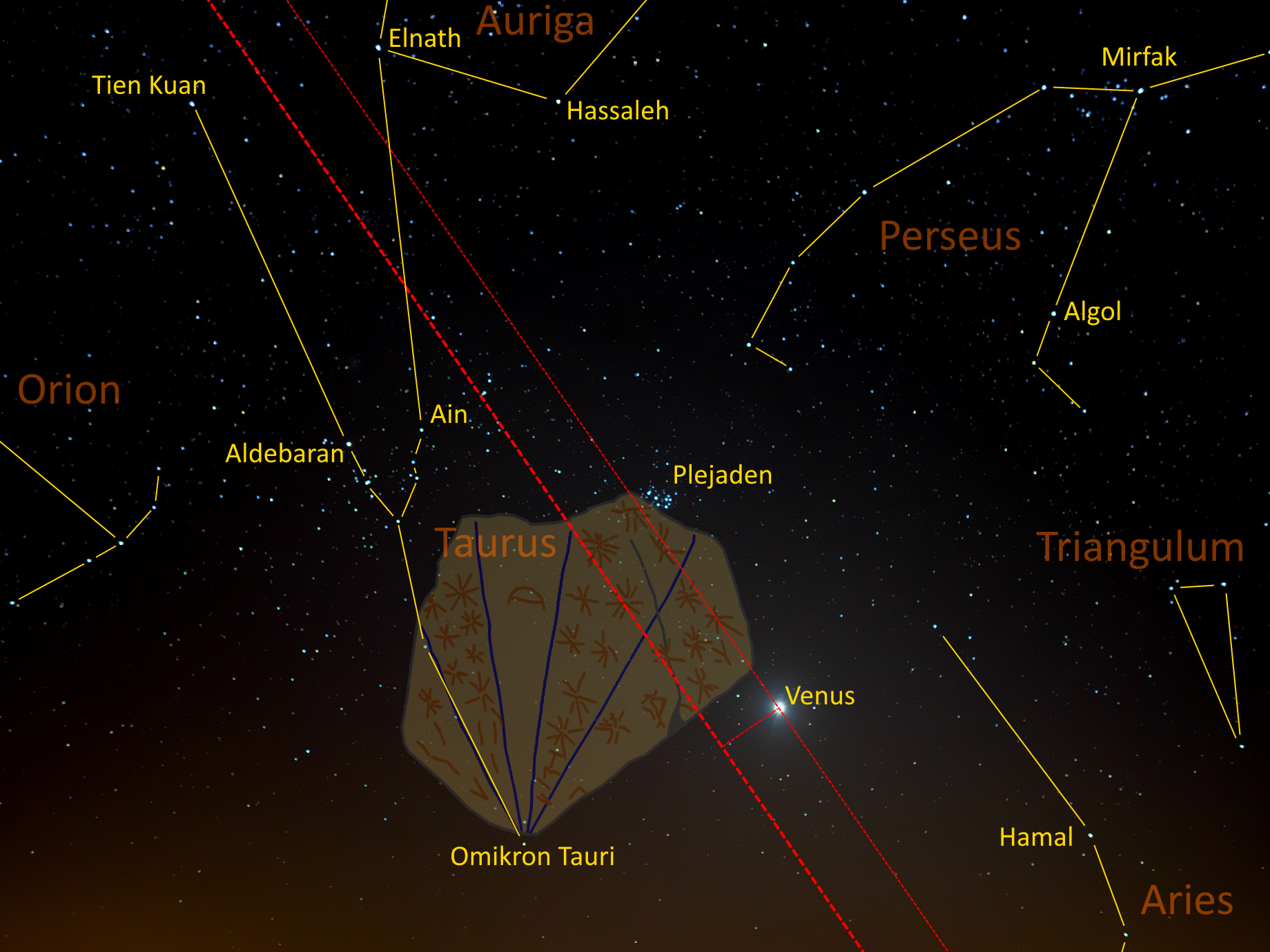
Position of the aligned tablet between the bright stars of the night sky with the present-day constellations

== Full history ==
- Full history p. 36-44.
