= National Museum of Archaeology, Malta =

National Museum of Archaeology
- Mużew Nazzjonali tal-Arkeoloġija
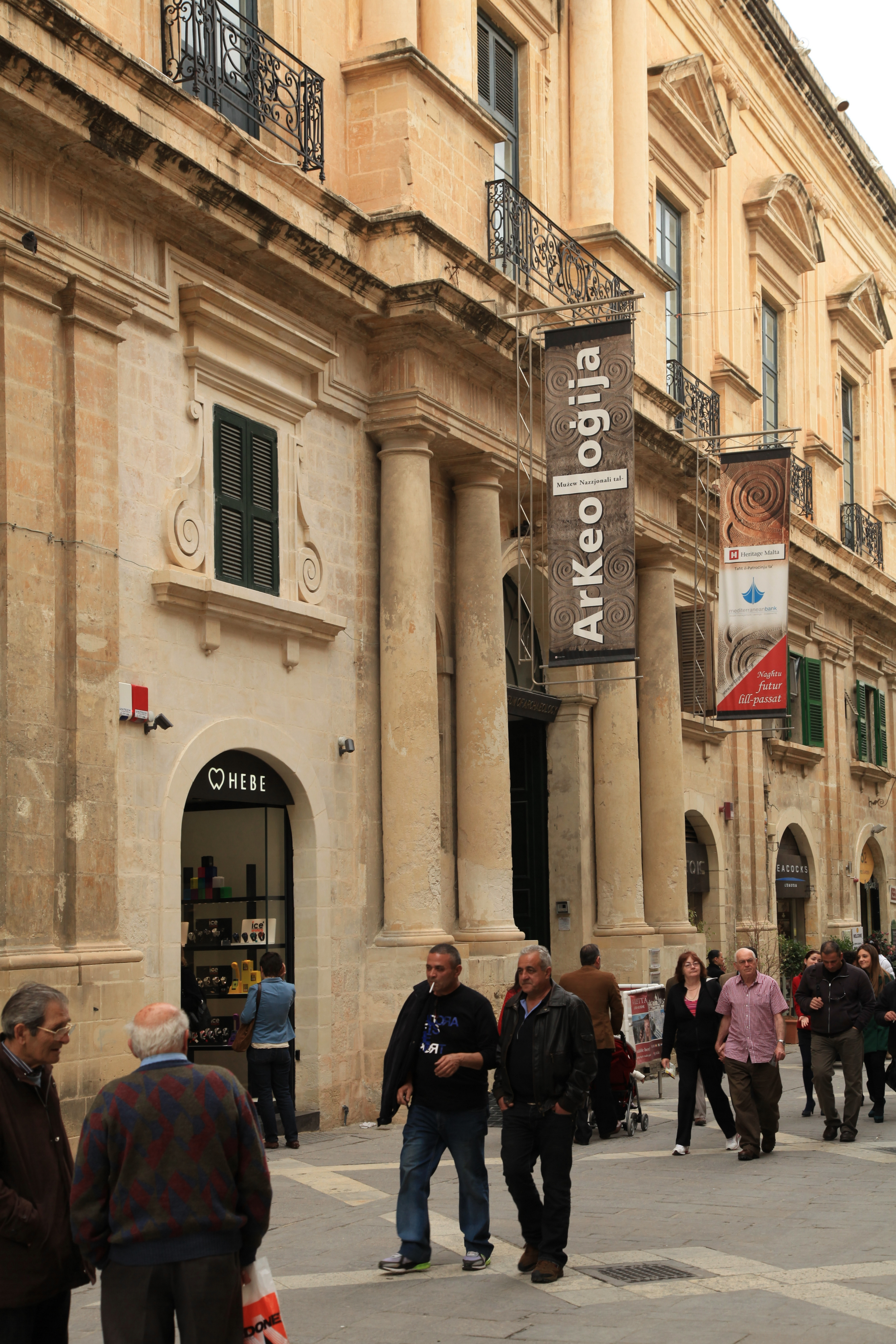
- National Museum of Archaeology at Auberge de Provence
- Former name: National Museum
- Established: January 1958
- Location: Auberge de Provence, Republic Street, Valletta, Malta
- Coordinates: 35°53′51″N 14°30′40.5″E
- Type: Archaeology Museum
- Public transit access: 200 metre walk from Valletta City Gate
- Website: www.heritagemalta.org

The National Museum of Archaeology (Maltese: Mużew Nazzjonali tal-Arkeoloġija) is a Maltese archaeological museum located in Valletta, with artefacts from Maltese prehistory, Phoenician times and a notable numismatic collection. It is managed by Heritage Malta.

== History ==
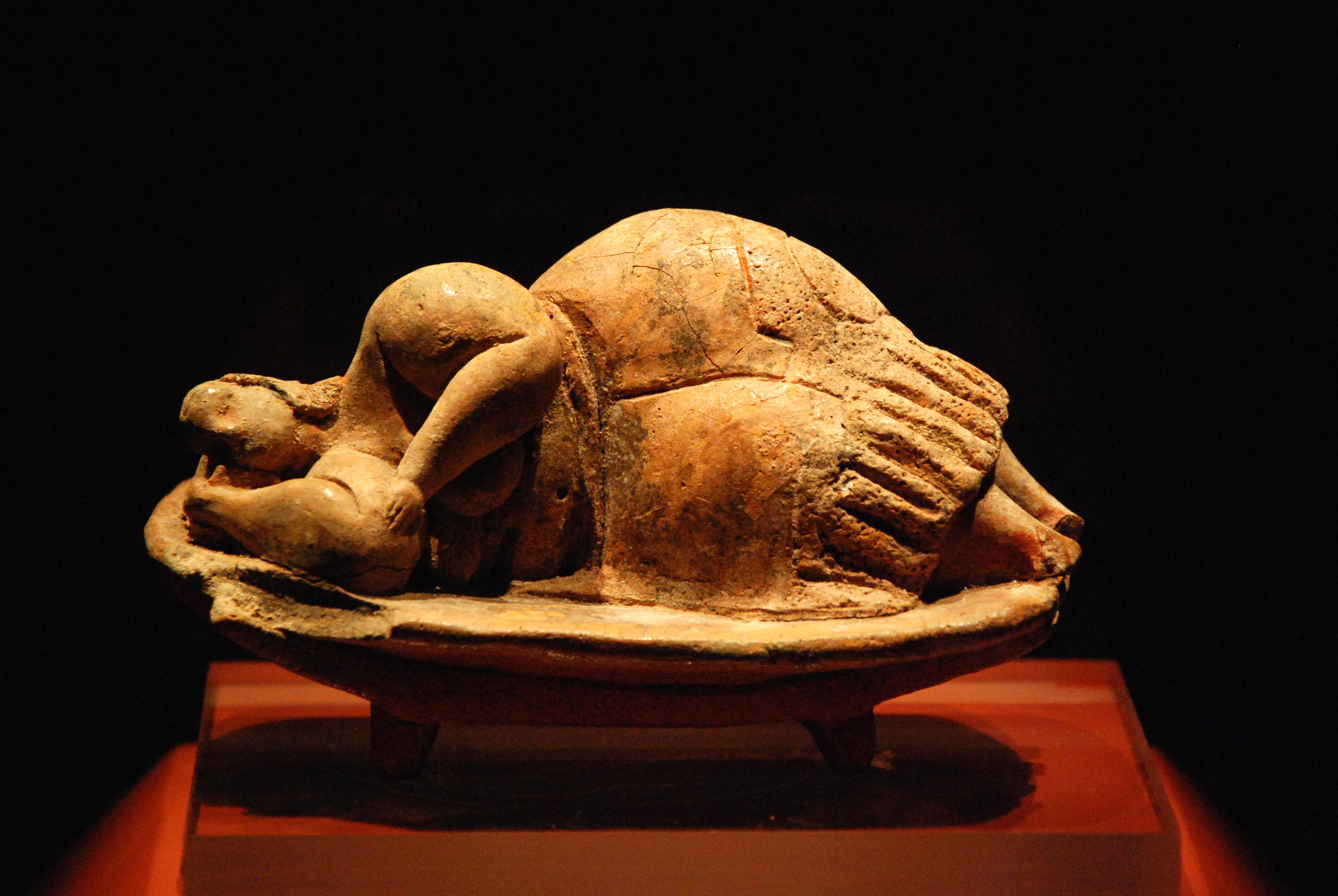
Sleeping Lady from Ħal Saflieni Hypogeum

The Auberge de Provence was opened as the National Museum in 1958 by Agatha Barbara, the then Minister of Education. The museum originally included the archaeological collection on the ground floor and fine arts on the first floor. The first curator was Captain Charles G. Zammit, the son of the eminent Maltese archaeologist Sir Themistocles Zammit.

In 1974, the fine arts collection was moved to the National Museum of Fine Arts, newly established in the Admiralty House building in South Street, Valletta, and the National Museum was renamed the National Museum for Archaeology.

The museum was refurbished and upgraded in 1998. Artefacts were placed in climate-controlled displays so that the exhibition met with current conservation standards.

== Building ==
The Auberge de Provence is a baroque building in Republic Street, Valletta, built for the Order of Saint John in 1571. It was designed by the Maltese architect Girolamo Cassar, who directed the building of most important buildings in the early days of Valletta. The building was subject to various alterations during its history, including an extensive reconstruction of the façade to integrate shops at ground floor level during the early seventeenth century. The Gran Salon on the first floor is the most ornate room in the building. The Knights used it for business discussions, and as a refectory and banqueting hall, where they sat at long tables according to seniority.

When Napoleon expelled the Knights from Malta in 1798 the Auberge was leased to the Malta Union Club. Though the lease was to expire in 2002, on 12 August 1955 the Auberge was assigned to house Malta's National Museum.

== Collection ==
The ground floor of the museum exhibits prehistoric artefacts from the Maltese islands, from the Għar Dalam phase (5200 BC), the earliest appearance of settlement on the island, up to the Tarxien phase (2500 BC).

=== Early Neolithic Period Room (5200–3800 BC) ===
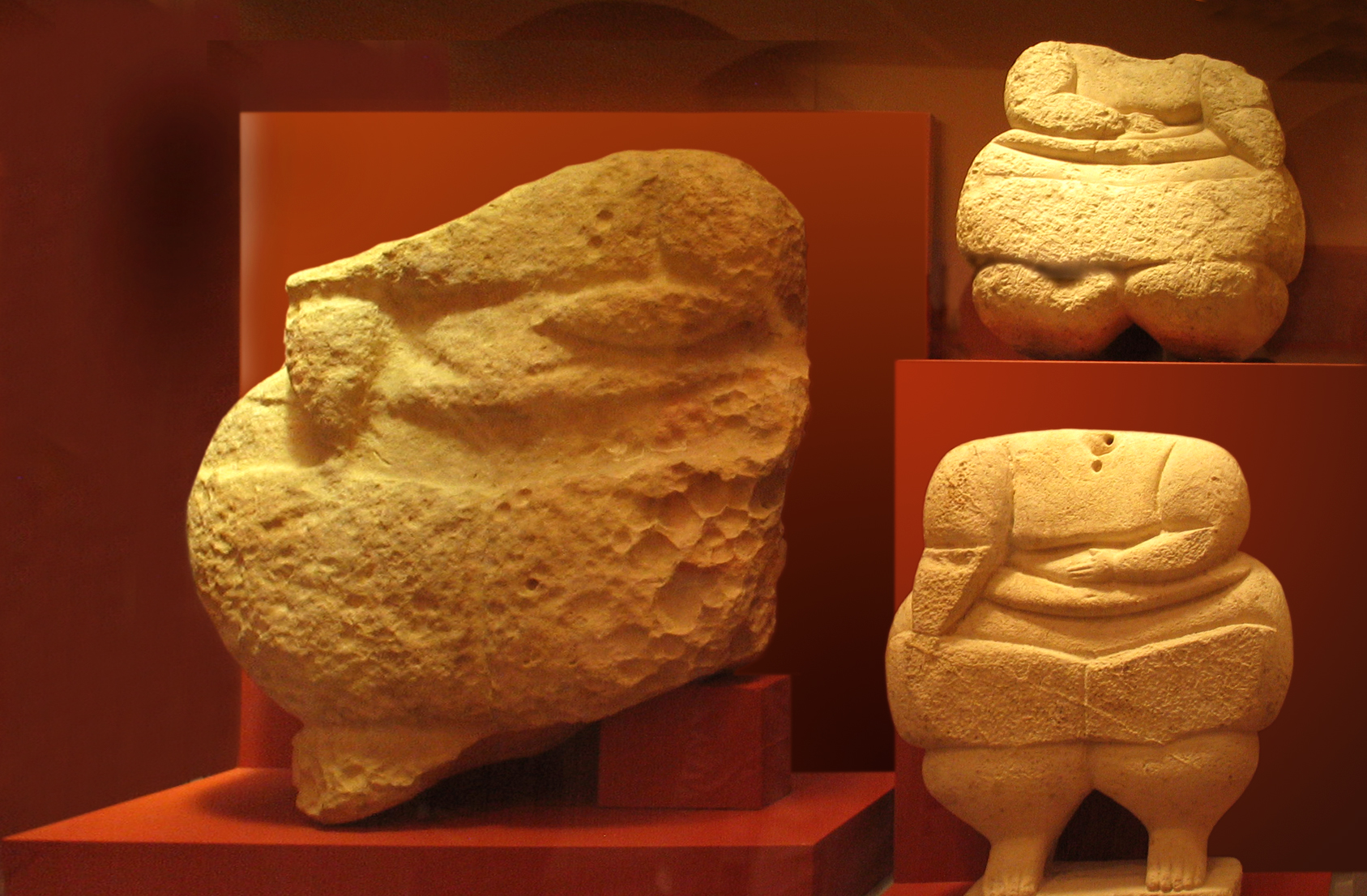
Corpulent figures from Ħaġar Qim

This room exhibits artefacts from the early Neolithic Period, including decorated pottery from the Għar Dalam, Grey Skorba, Red Skorba and Żebbuġ phases.

Of particular importance are the Red Skorba figurines, the earliest local representations of the human figure and the predecessors of the statues of later temple periods.

The exhibition features a reconstruction of the rock-cut tombs that were a characteristic of the early Neolithic period in Malta. Rock-cut tombs reached their climax in burials like the Ħal Saflieni Hypogeum and the Xagħra Stone Circle; photographs of both sites are displayed in the museum.

=== Temple Period Rooms (3800–2500 BC) ===
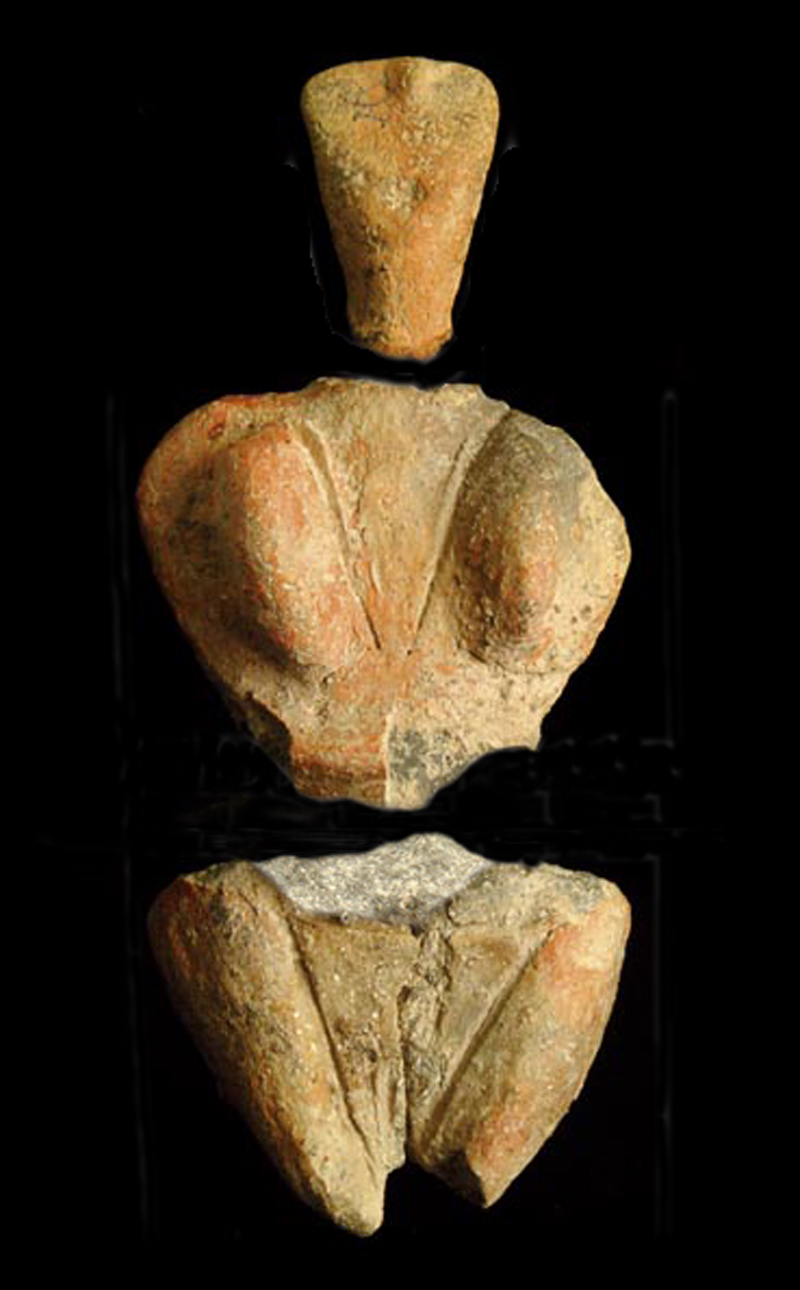
Red Skorba figurine

These rooms show examples of architecture, human representation and other items that date from the Mġarr, Ġgantija, Saflieni and Tarxien phases of Maltese prehistory. The temples that were built at this time are considered to be the world's first free standing monuments and are listed in the UNESCO World Heritage List.

The museum exhibits numerous corpulent statues representing human bodies unearthed from temple excavations, along with phallic representations. Until recently the statues were called Mother Goddesses, Fat Ladies, Deities and Priests among other names, but it is now argued that these statues were probably asexual and represented a human being, irrespective of whether it was male or female. The representations vary in size and shape, with the largest being as tall as 2.7 m and the smallest 4 mm.

The discovery of temple altars and corpulent human representations suggests that some type of cult existed on the islands of Malta and Gozo in prehistory. Given the corpulency of the statues it may be that the cult was tied to a fertility rite. Fertility at this time must have been very important since, apart from family growth, it also meant the reproduction of crops and animals.

The exhibition includes altars excavated from the Tarxien Temples that were probably used for animal sacrifices. They were brought to the museum for conservation reasons.

=== Bronze Age Hall (2400 – 700BC) ===
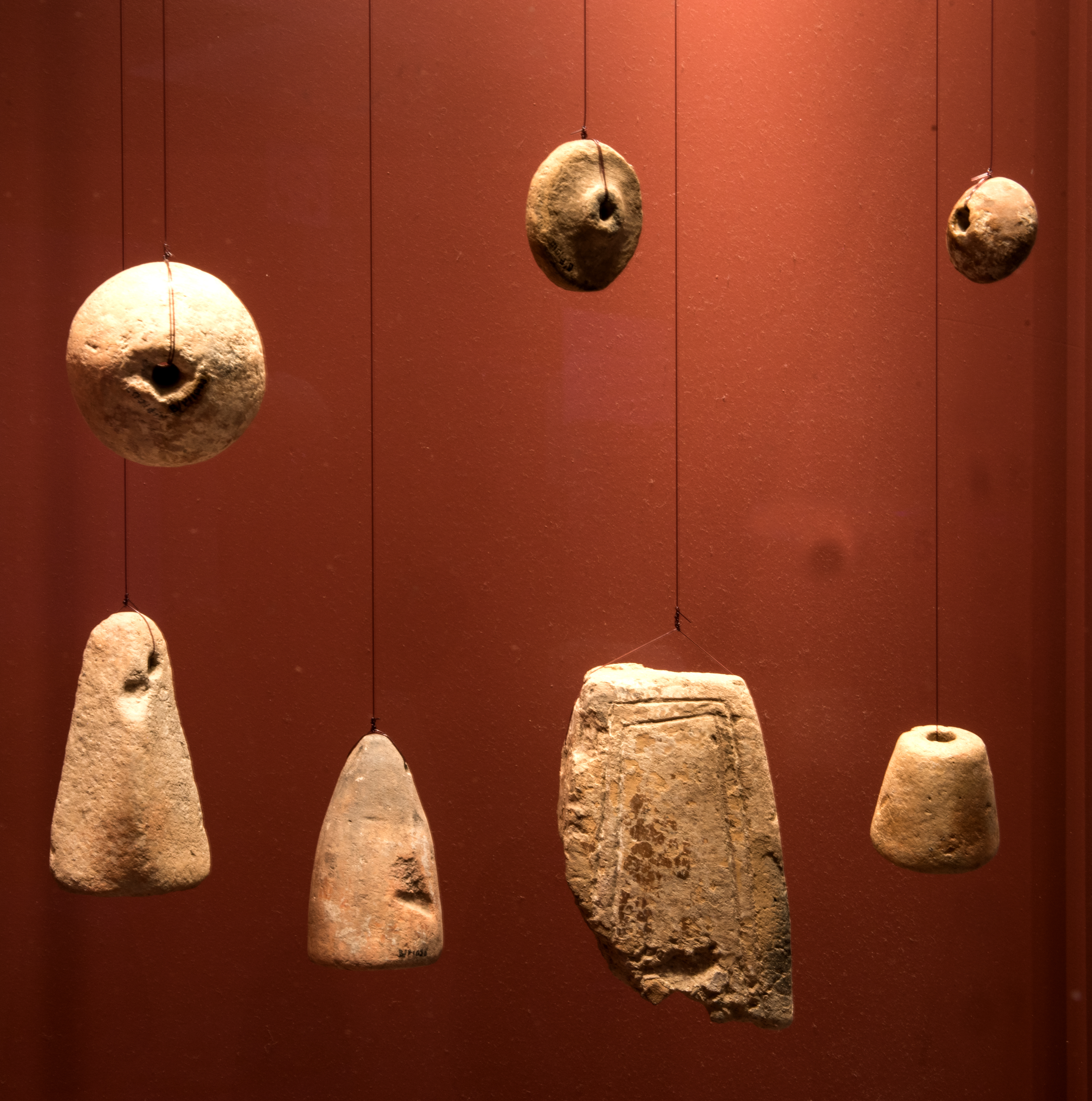
Stone weight looms

The Bronze Age Hall tells us about the culture and rituals of new peoples that moved to the Islands c. 2,400BC.

The remains from the Bronze Age attest to a total break with the culture of the Temple Period. The richly decorated temples which defined the previous culture, are replaced by fortified settlements, built into rocky natural defences, that bear witness to more defensive newcomers.

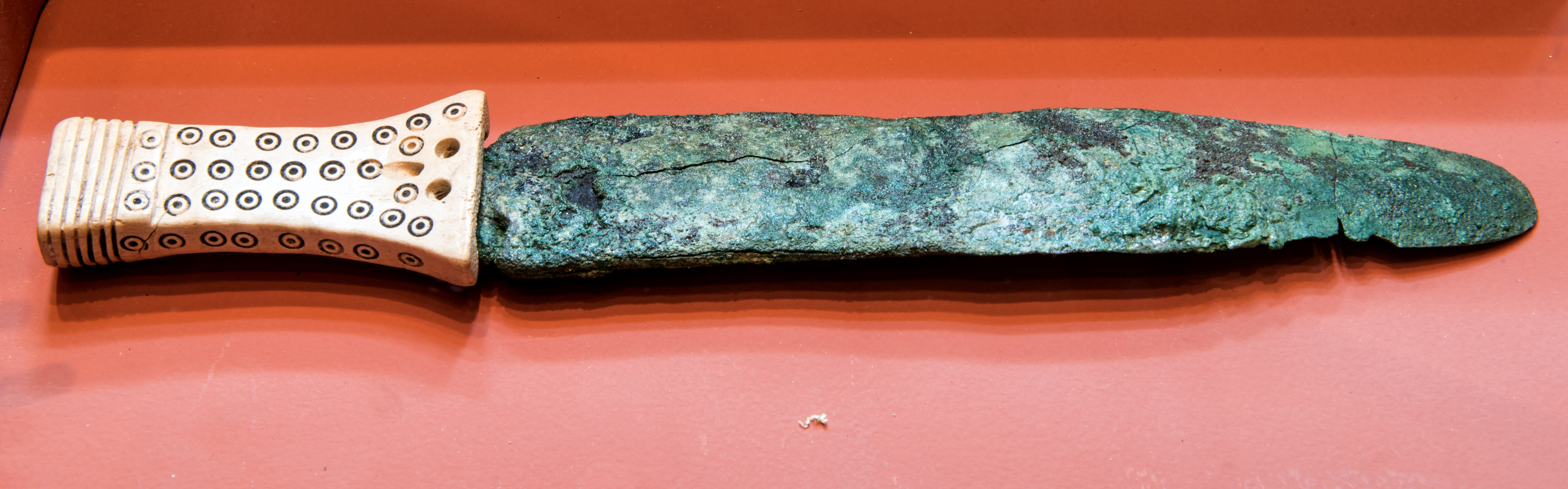
Dagger with a carved bone handle

The Maltese Islands themselves do not have the metal resources by which this culture is defined. Metal ore, to make copper and bronze objects such as the knives and axe heads we see in the display, needed to be imported. On the other hand, the whorls and loom weights are testimony to a well-developed textile industry, and may have been an important export to balance payments.

The pottery from this period is marked by geometric lines and new pottery forms. Ashes and burnt bones found in intact pots are evidence of cremation ceremonies, a practice which seems to have been introduced during this period. Body ornaments made of fish-bones, shell and faience, as well as daggers and axes, discovered in Bronze Age burial sites, accompanied the cremated remains.

Of note are a new highly stylized form of body representation which are completely different to the ones belonging to the previous Temple period. They are flattened figures with disk-like torsos, narrow heads and no arms. The torsos are inscribed with the same geometric motifs that adorn contemporary pottery.

=== Cart-Ruts Room ===
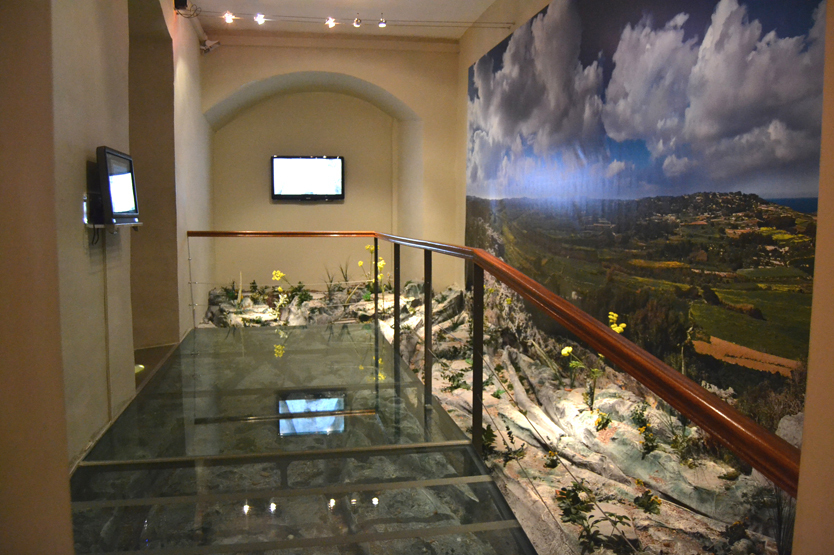
Cart Ruts Room

Here we find a reproduction of the mysterious cart-ruts, which are widespread throughout Malta and Gozo.

Although some are thought to be Bronze Age, their precise period has not yet been established, and neither has their use. Were they used as a mode of transport, using wheeled or sliding carts, or were they water channels?

The model and accompanying video by the late and renowned Dr. David Trump shows features such as depth, slope, lurches and forkings which give a sense of their configuration in the Maltese landscape, and delves into a number of possibilities.

=== Phoenician Hall ===
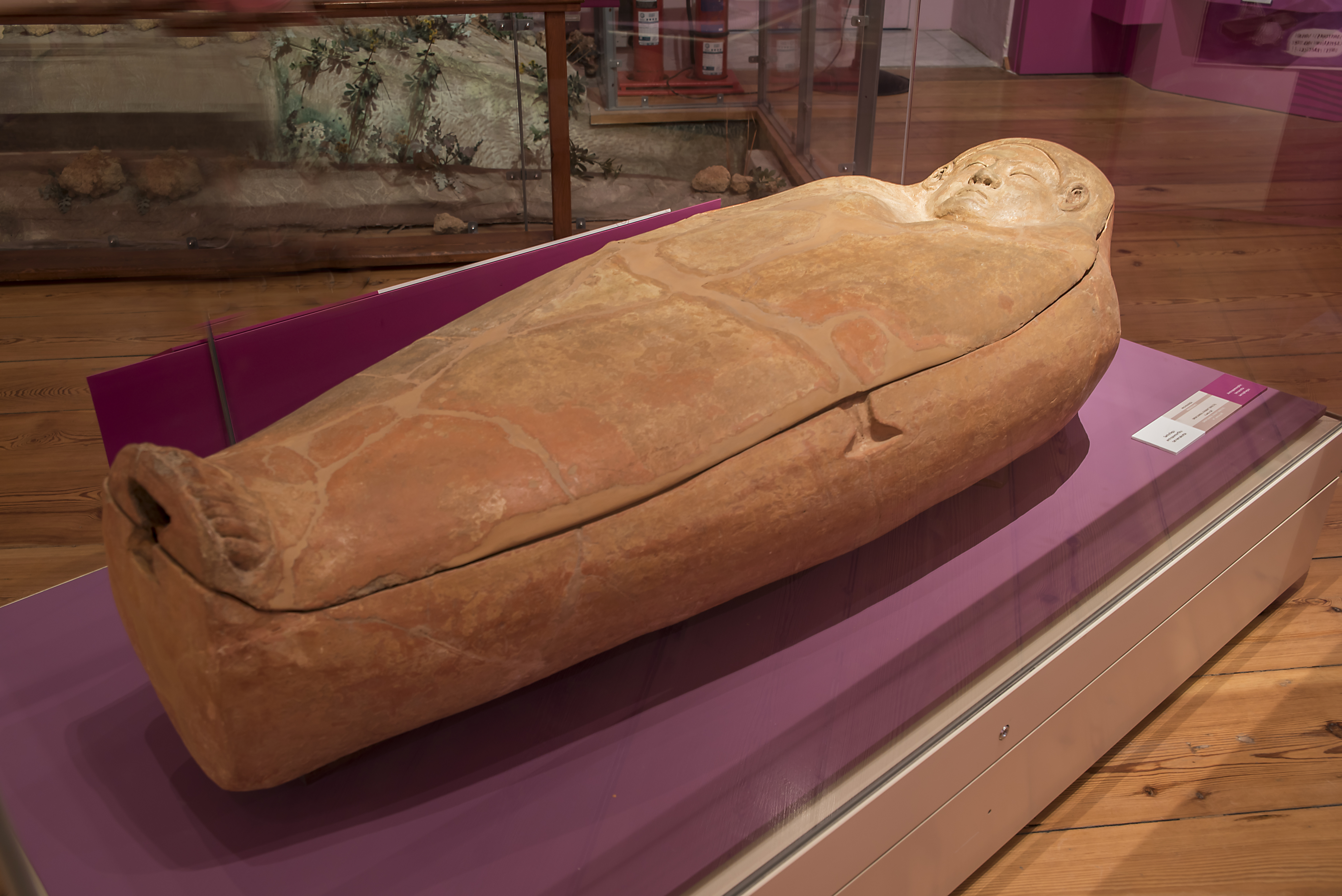
Phoenician Sarcophagus

The Phoenician Hall collection contains examples of pottery, jewellery and glass-ware produced by the Phoenicians, some locally as an important outpost in the Western Mediterranean. Notable objects include the Mdina stele inscription, and an amulet made of solid gold consisting of two standing gods, Horus and Anubis, soldered together back to back and a hollow bronze amulet with the head of Horus which contained a tiny papyrus scroll with an inscription. Both amulets were found in tombs, and are evidence of the strong Egyptian influence in Phoenician belief, ritual and afterlife.

A whole section is devoted to mortuary customs. Both cremation and inhumation were practiced during this period. Pride of place is given to a terracotta anthropoid sarcophagus discovered in a rock-cut tomb in 1797.

=== National Numismatic Collection ===
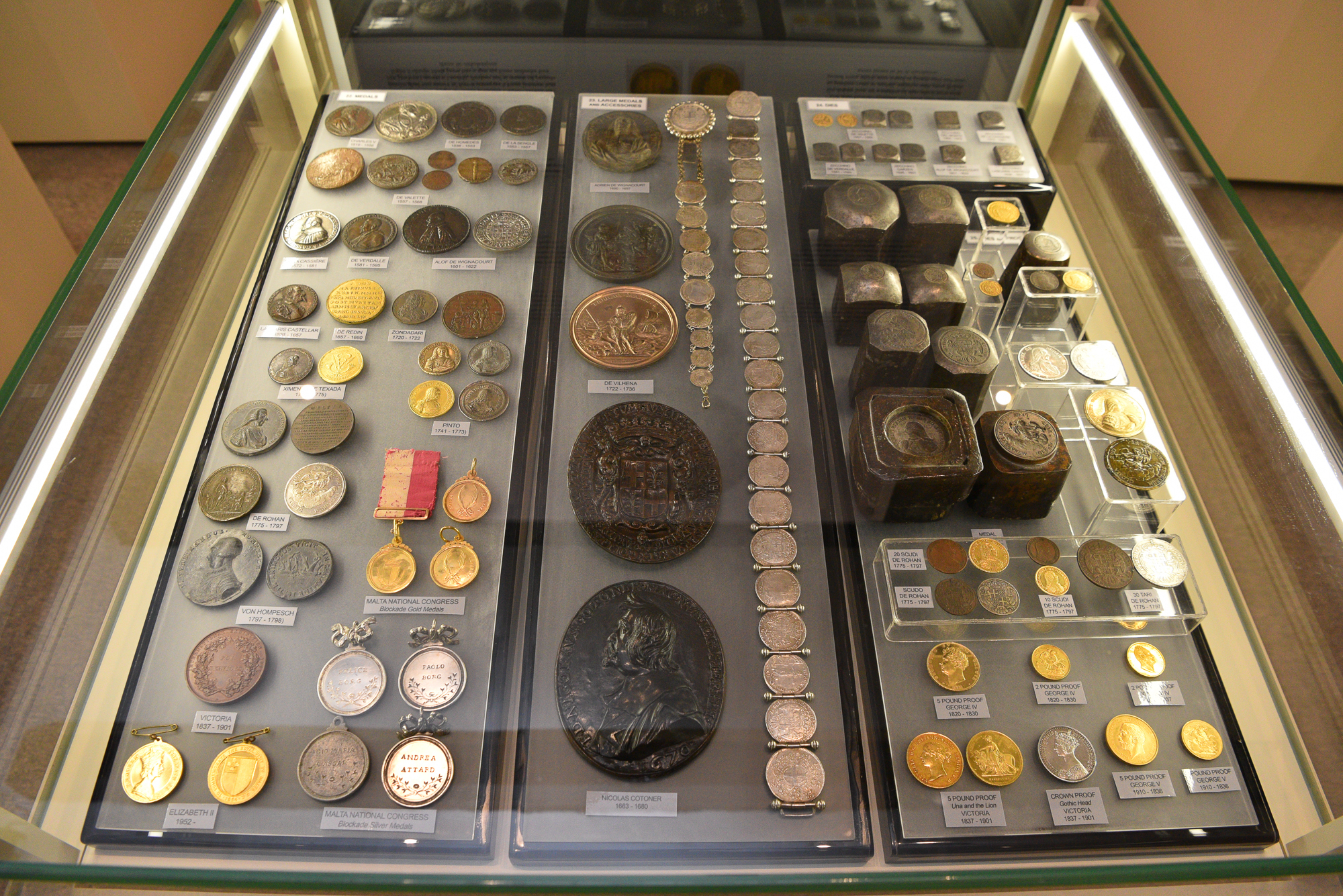
Numismatic Hall

On the top floor, one can visit the National Numismatic Collection. Stemming from a donation bequeathed by Prof. Salvatore Luigi Pisani (1828–1908) in 1899, the collection has continued to grow and now consists of more than 16,000 coins, commemorative medals and dies.

The coins are testimony to centuries of foreign rulers, almost each imprinting their gods, themselves or their coats of arms on local coinage. The collection boasts coins from each occupation including, Punic, Roman, Byzantine, Muslim, Norman, Aragonese, the Order of St John and British. The museum houses the most comprehensive collection of coinage from the Order of St. John including rare specimens.

The coins and medals mark important events. One of note is the copper fiduciary coins, introduced by La Valette following the building of Valletta. It is marked with the words NON AES SED FIDES (not copper but trust) and replaced the silver scudi with copper coins, a testimony to the changing relationship of the Order to the Islands which it would occupy for another two hundred years.

== Plans ==
The museum plans to open the first floor galleries and expand the exhibition in the near future to include archaeological artefacts from the Roman and Medieval Periods.

== Opening hours ==
Between January and September, the museum is open Monday to Sunday from 9 am until 5 pm, with last admission at 4.30 pm.

During the months of October, November and December, opening hours are from 9 am until 6 pm, with last admission at 5.30 pm.

It is closed on Good Friday, Christmas Eve and Christmas Day, and New Year's Eve and New Year's Day.

== See also ==
- List of museums in Malta
