= Skorba Temples =

Skorba
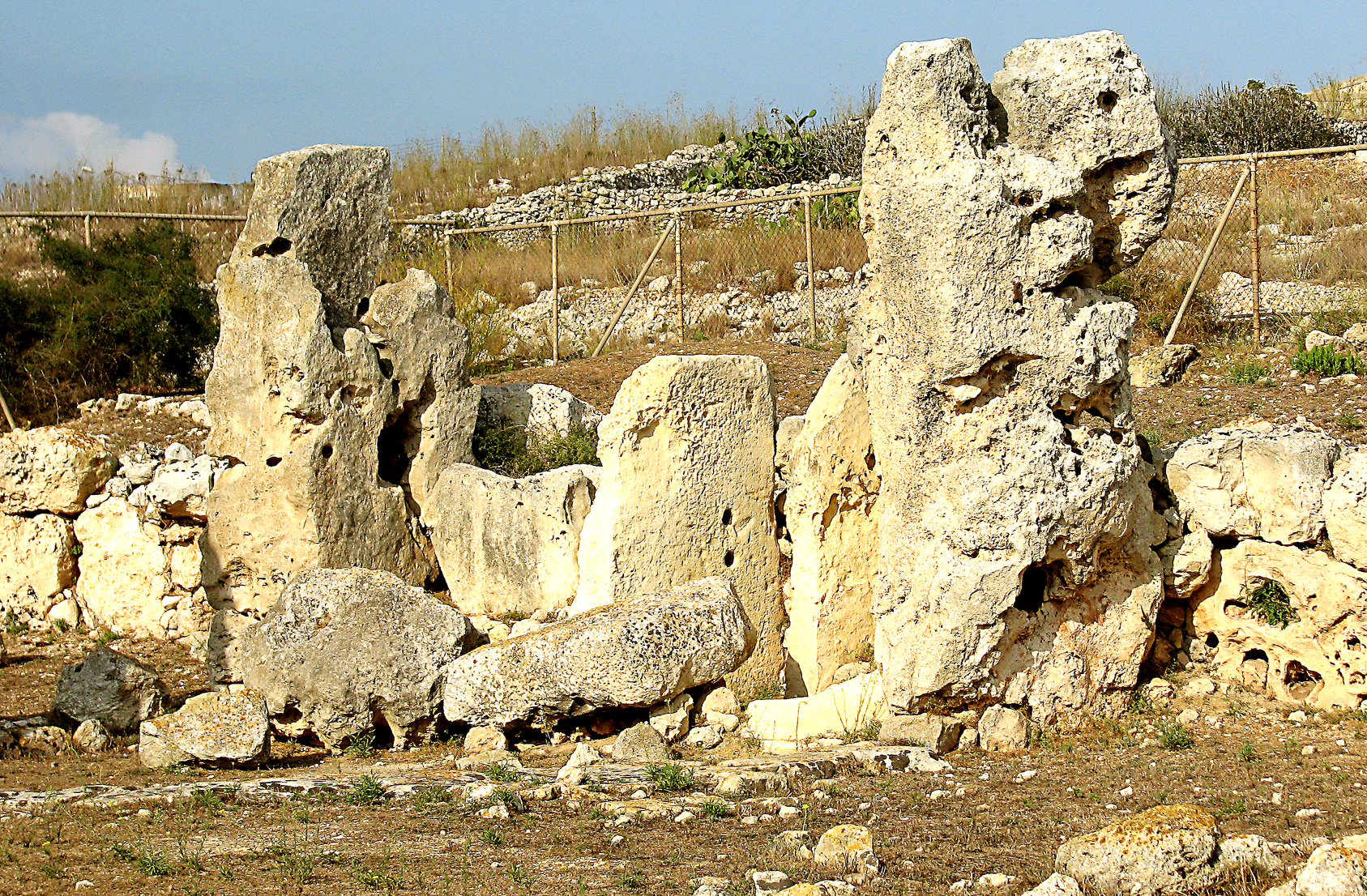

- Location within Malta
- 35°55′14.84″N 14°22′39.58″E
- Type: Temple; Village
- Periods: Għar Dalam phase Grey Skorba phase Red Skorba phase Ġgantija phase Tarxien phase
- Location: Żebbiegħ, Mġarr, Malta

History
- Built: c.4850 BC (earliest remains) c.3600 BC (temple)

Site notes
- Material: Limestone
- Excavation dates: 1914–1961
- Archaeologists: David Trump
- Condition: Ruins
- Owner: Government of Malta
- Management: Heritage Malta
- Public access: Yes
- Website: Heritage Malta

UNESCO World Heritage Site
- Part of: Megalithic Temples of Malta
- Criteria: Cultural: (iv)
- Reference: 132ter-005
- Inscription: 1980 (4th Session)
- Extensions: 1992, 2015
- Area: 0.103 ha (11,100 sq ft)

The Skorba temples are megalithic remains on the northern edge of Żebbiegħ, in the Northern Region of Malta, which have provided detailed and informative insight into the earliest periods of Malta's neolithic culture. The site was only excavated in the early 1960s, rather late in comparison to other megalithic sites, some of which had been studied since the early 19th century. The site's importance has led to its listing as a UNESCO World Heritage Site, a listing it shares with six other megalithic temples in Malta.

This later excavation allowed the use of modern methods of dating and analysis. The temple itself is not in good condition, especially in comparison to the more complete temples of Ħaġar Qim and Tarxien. However, the importance of this site does not lie in the actual remains but rather in what was garnered from their excavation.

== Description ==
The Żebbiegħ area around Skorba appears to have been inhabited very early in the Neolithic period. When the eminent Maltese historian Sir Temi Żammit excavated the nearby temples of Ta' Ħaġrat, only a single upright slab protruded from a small mound of debris on the Skorba site. Although it was included on the Antiquities List of 1925, archeologists ignored this mound until David H. Trump excavated it between 1960 and 1963.

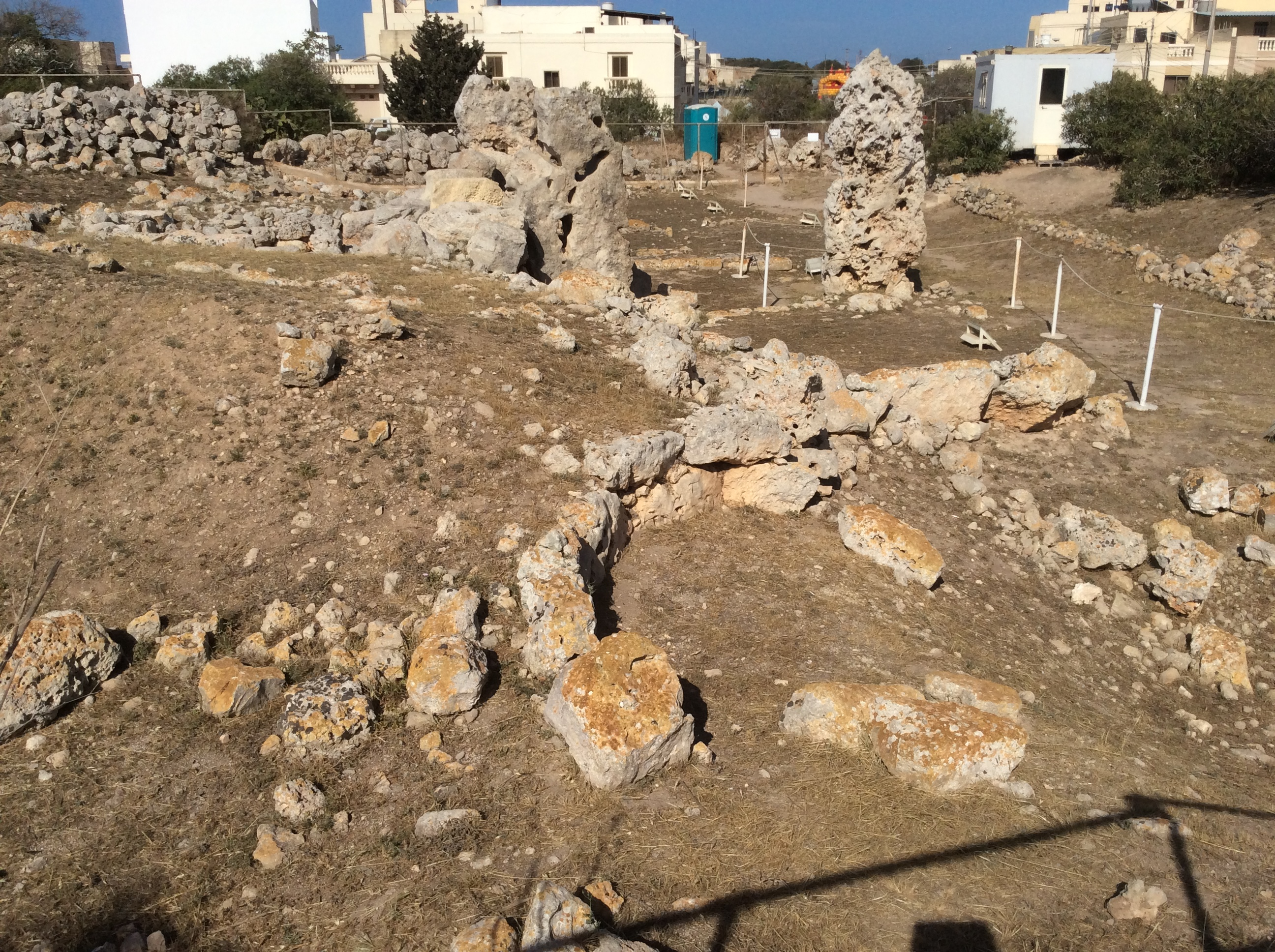

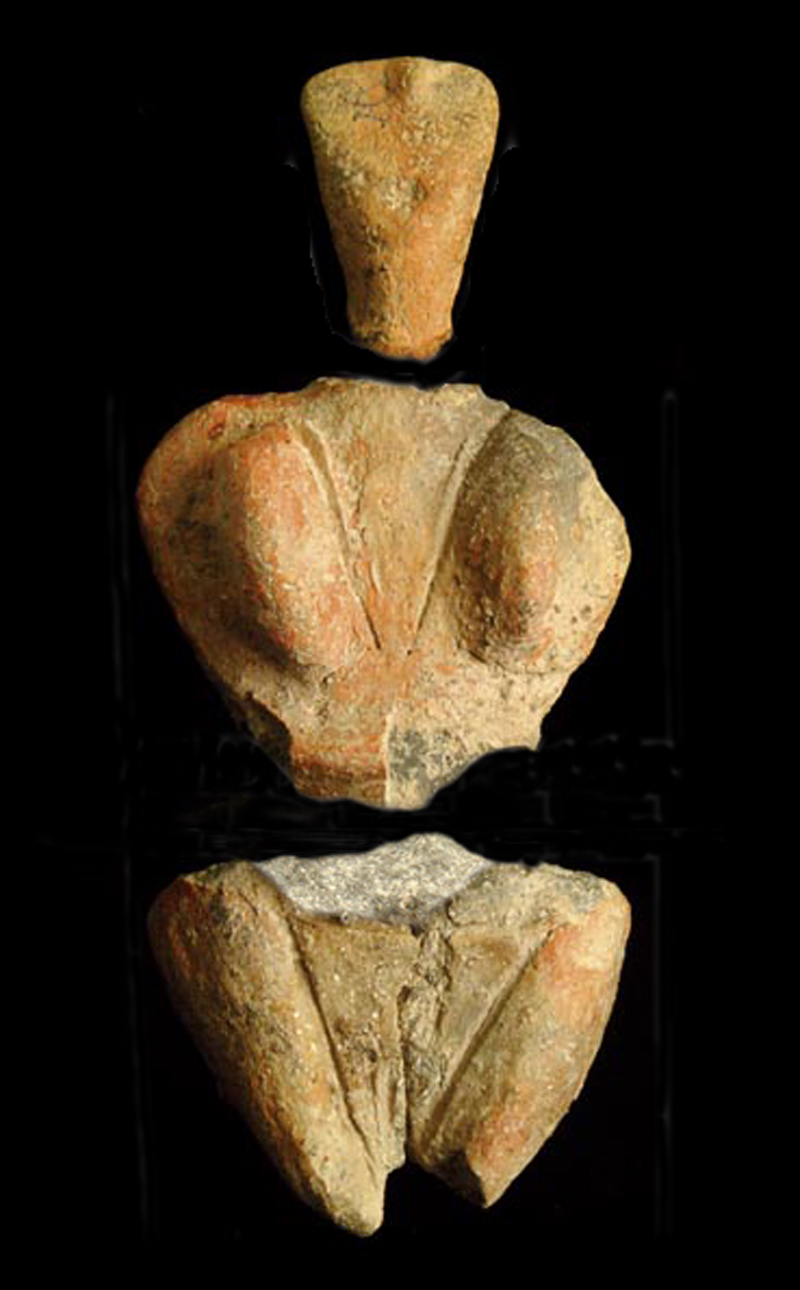
Terracotta Mother Goddess found at Skorba (National Museum of Archaeology, Valletta)

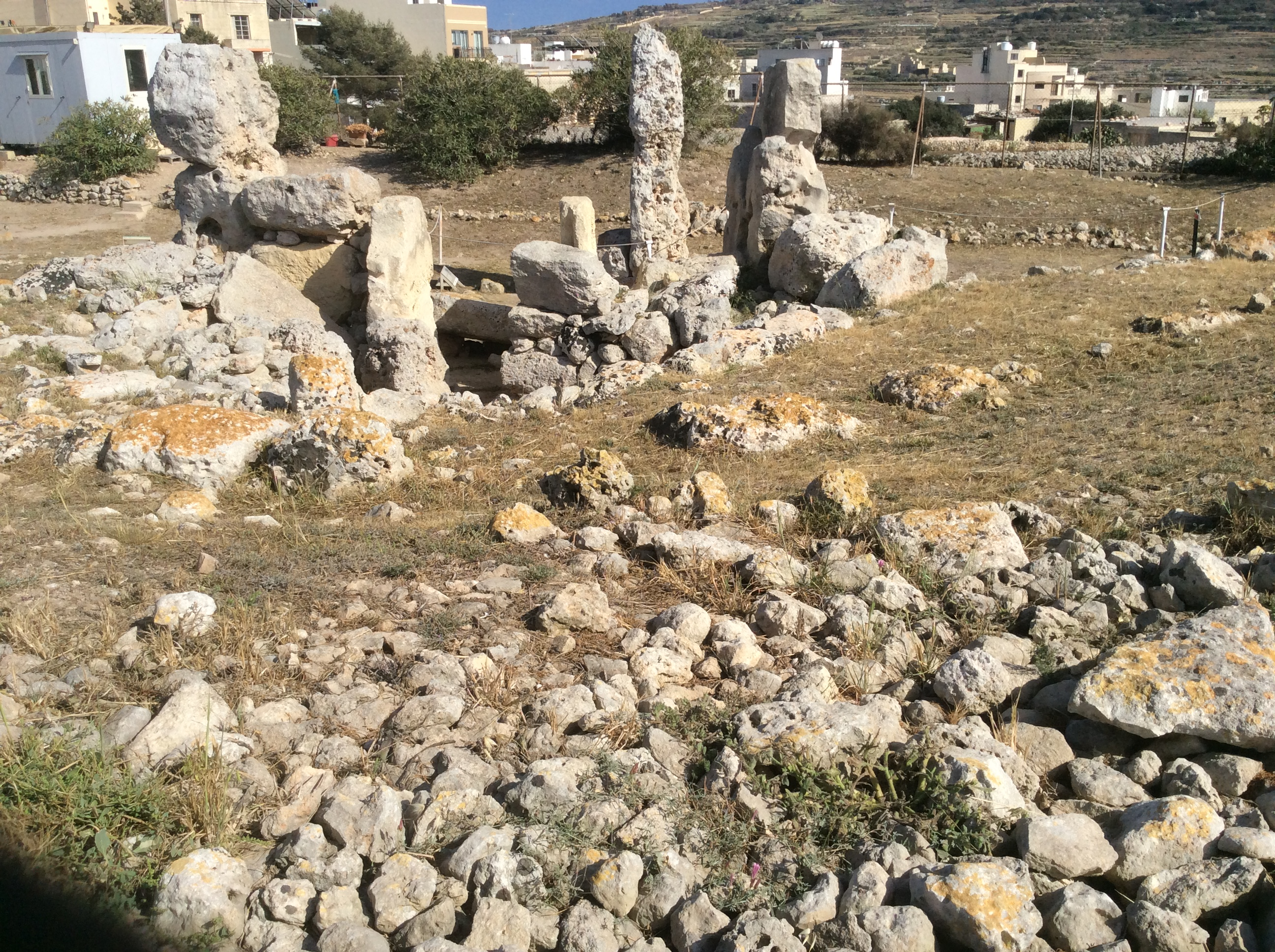
Entire Skorba Temple

The remains on the site are a series of megalithic uprights (one of them 3.4m high), the lowest course of the temples' foundations, paving slabs with libation holes in the entrance passage, and the torba (a cement-like material) floor of a three-apse temple. This three-apse shape is typical of the Ġgantija phase. Unfortunately, the greater part of the first two apses and the whole of the façade have been razed to ground level.

The north wall is in a better state of preservation. Originally, the entrance of the temple opened on a court, but in later additions during the Tarxien phase, the temple's doorway was closed off, with altars set in the corners formed by the closure. East of this temple, a second monument was added in the Tarxien phase, with four apses and a central niche.

For a period of roughly twelve centuries before the temples were built, a village already stood on the site. Its oldest extant structure is the eleven metre long straight wall to the west of the temples’ first entrance. Deposits at its base contained material from the first known human occupation of the island, the Għar Dalam phase, including charcoal, which carbon analysis dated to 4850 BC.

== Pottery ==
The pottery found on the site is divided into two styles, the Grey Skorba phase distinguished by grey-colored pottery with no motifs, and the Red Skorba phase, which is exactly like the grey Skorba but colored using red ocher.

== See also ==
- Old European culture
- List of megalithic sites
