= Santa Verna =

Megalithic temple site in Malta

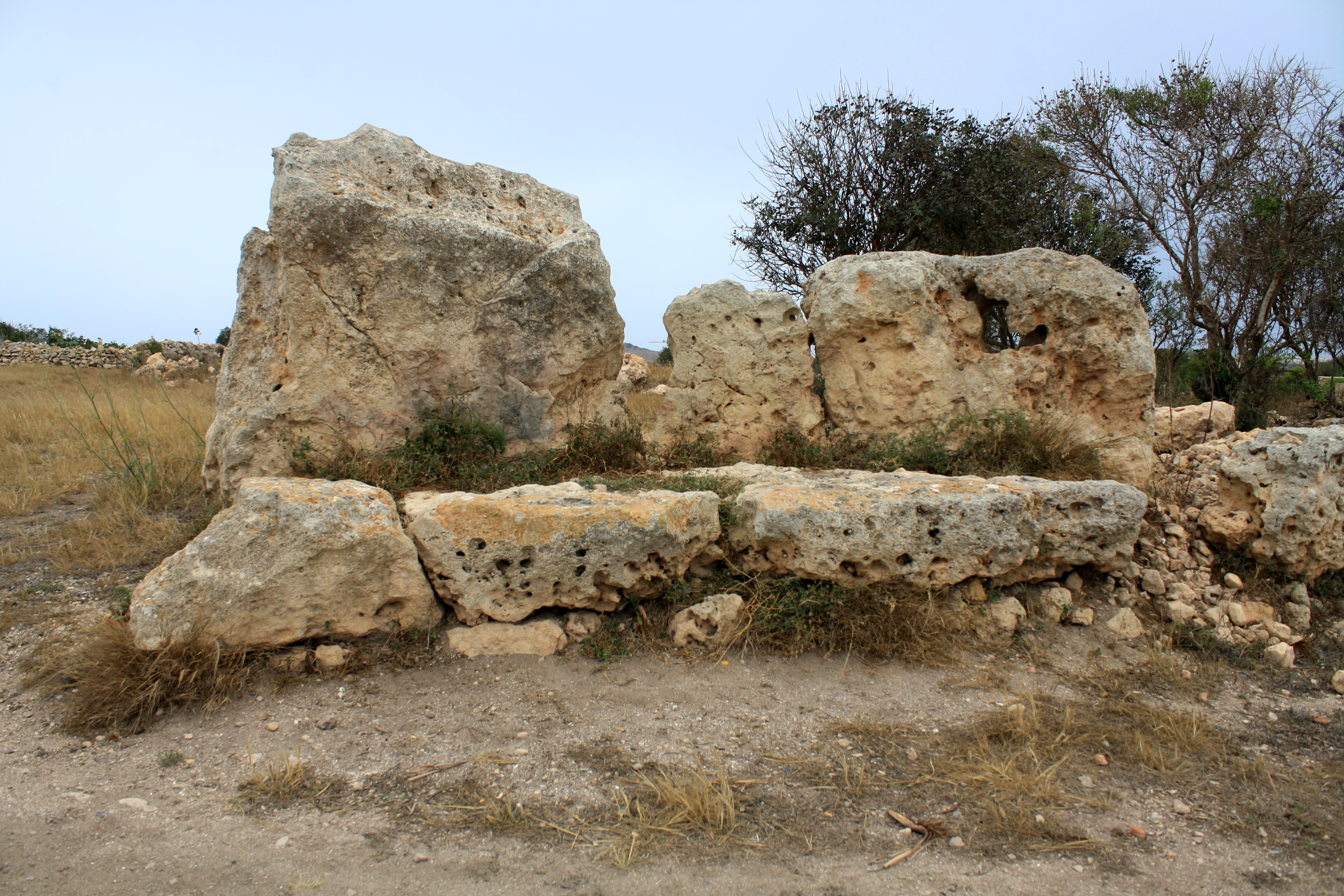
- Remains of Santa Verna temple in 2016

- Location in Malta
- 36°2′44.1″N 14°15′31″E
- Type: Settlement
- Periods: Għar Dalam phase Ġgantija phase
- Location: Xagħra, Gozo, Malta
- Part of: Megalithic Temples of Malta

History
- Built: c. 5000 BC

Site notes
- Material: Limestone
- Excavation dates: 1911, 1961, and 2015
- Archaeologists: T. Eric Peet; Thomas Ashby; R. N. Bradley; David H. Trump
- Condition: Poorly preserved ruins

Santa Verna is a megalithic site in Xagħra on the island of Gozo, Malta. The site was originally occupied by a village and a megalithic temple. Although the temple is in poor condition now, in ancient times it was probably one of the major temples in the Maltese islands. The site takes its name from a chapel dedicated to Saint Venera that once stood close to the temple.

== Site ==
Santa Verna was originally a prehistoric village, and the earliest pottery remains date back to around 5000 BC, during the Għar Dalam phase. The temple itself was built in the following centuries and it had a trefoil shape, which was typical of the time. In its heyday, Santa Verna was probably an important temple, which rivaled other major temples such as Ġgantija, Tarxien and Ħaġar Qim.

The only remains of the temple that survive today are three upright megaliths, another three horizontal blocks lining their eastern side, and the earth floor which makes it possible to see the temple's original outline.

== Excavations ==
The megalithic remains at Santa Verna were found by Nikola Said, a worker at the Public Works Department. They were also noted by the archaeologist Manuel Magri in the early 20th century. The site was excavated in 1911 by Thomas Ashby and R. N. Bradley. During the excavations, two complete skeletons and several incomplete ones were found, including one of a child. Many smaller artifacts were also found during the excavations.

The remains were included on the Antiquities List of 1925. Another excavation was made in 1961 by David Trump, when the remains of the village that predates the temple were found. More extensive excavations funded by the European Research Council in 2015 revealed the five-apsed plan of the temple during the Ġgantija phase, further evidence of the earlier settlement, and recovered samples of ancient animal bones, wheat, barley and legumes.
