= Mġarr (disambiguation) =

Mġarr is a town in the north-west of Malta.

Mġarr could also refer to:

- Mġarr (Gozo), a town and port in the east of Gozo
- Mġarr ix-Xini, a small bay in Gozo
- Mġarr phase, a short period in the prehistory of Malta
