= Ta' Ħaġrat Temples =

Ta' Ħaġrat
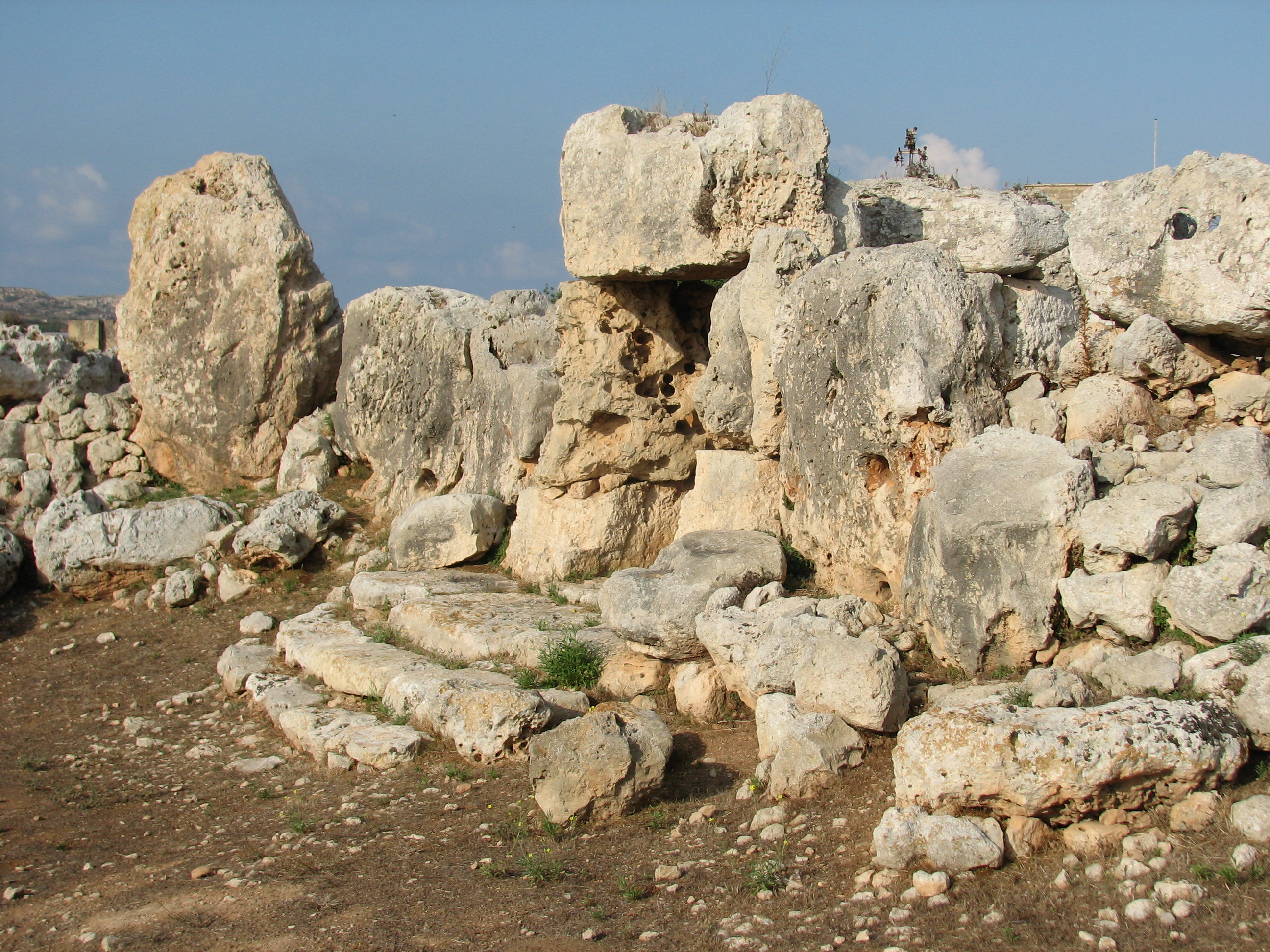
- Ta' Ħaġrat

- Location within Malta
- 35.9185°N 14.3686°E
- Type: Temple
- Periods: Ġgantija phase Saflieni phase
- Location: Mġarr, Malta

History
- Built: c.3600 BC–c.3200 BC

Site notes
- Material: Limestone
- Excavation dates: 1923–1961
- Archaeologists: Themistocles Zammit; John Davies Evans; David H. Trump
- Condition: Ruins
- Owner: Government of Malta
- Management: Heritage Malta
- Public access: Yes
- Website: Heritage Malta

UNESCO World Heritage Site
- Part of: Megalithic Temples of Malta
- Criteria: Cultural: (iv)
- Reference: 132ter-004
- Inscription: 1980 (4th Session)
- Extensions: 1992, 2015
- Area: 0.154 ha (16,600 sq ft)

The Ta' Ħaġrat ([taˈħad͡ʒrat]) temples in Mġarr, Malta are recognized as a UNESCO World Heritage Site, along with several other Megalithic temples. They are amongst the world's oldest religious sites. The larger Ta' Ħaġrat temple dates from the Ġgantija phase (3600–3200 BC); the smaller temple is dated to the Saflieni phase (3300–3000 BC).

== Location ==
Ta' Ħaġrat is on the eastern outskirts of the village of Mġarr, roughly one kilometer from the Ta' Skorba temples, excavated in 1963. Characteristics of the Ta' Ħaġrat façade resemble those in the Ta' Skorba complex.

== Temple complex ==
The excavation of pottery deposits shows that a village stood on the site and predates the temples themselves. This early pottery is dated to the Mġarr phase (3800-3600 BC).

Ta' Ħaġrat is built out of lower coralline limestone, the oldest exposed rock in the Maltese Islands. The complex contains two adjacent temples. The smaller temple abuts the major one on the northern side.

The two parts are less regularly planned and smaller in size than many of the other neolithic temples in Malta. Unlike other megalithic temples in Malta no decorated blocks were discovered; however a number of artifacts were found. Perhaps most intriguing is a scale model of a temple, sculpted in globigerina limestone.

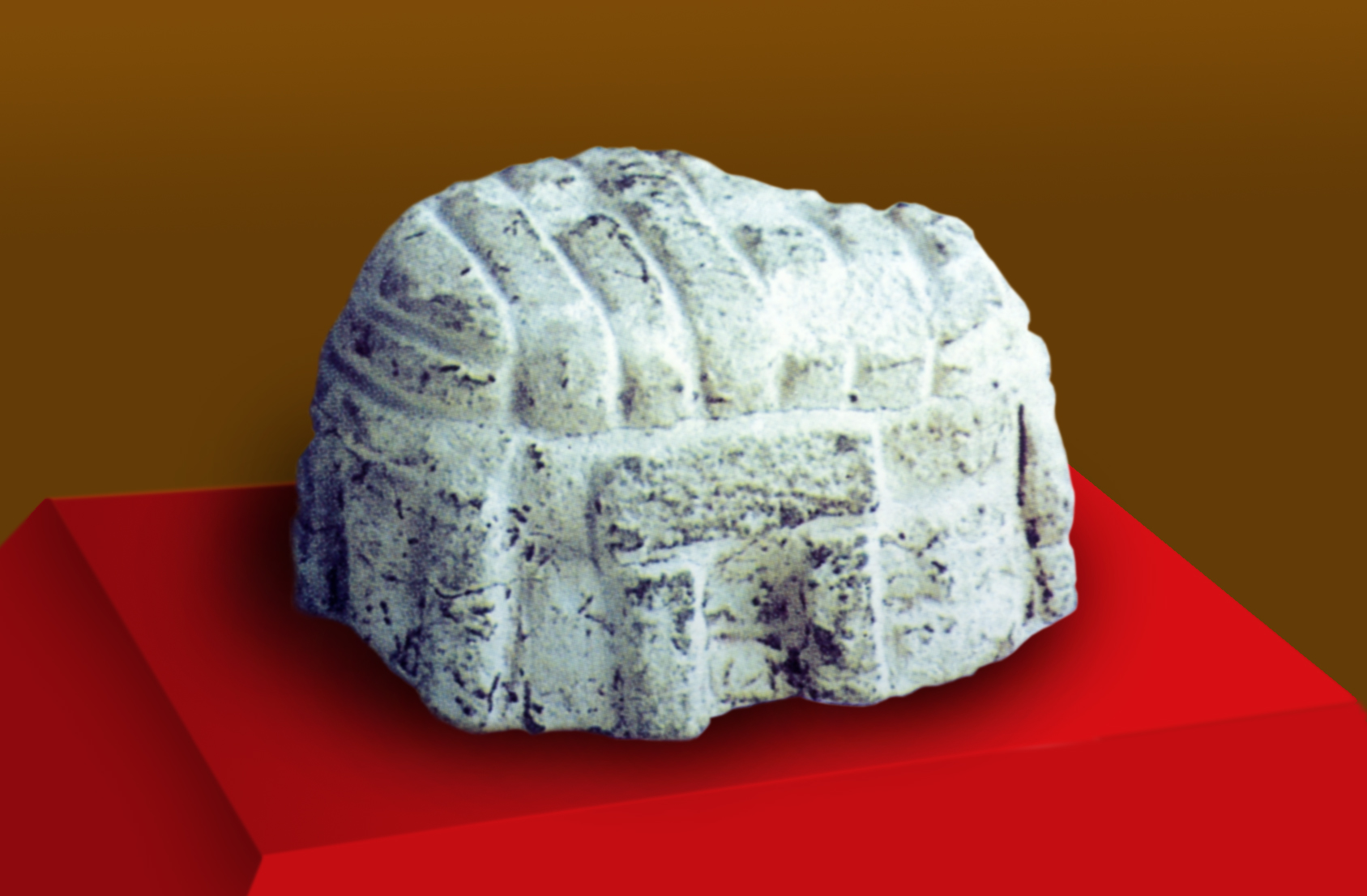
A sculptured temple discovered at Ta' Ħaġrat

The model is roofed and shows the typical structure of a Maltese temple including a trilithon façade, narrow-broad walling technique and upper layers of horizontal corbelling.

=== Major temple ===
The Ġgantija phase temple is typically trefoil, with a concave façade opening onto a spacious semicircular forecourt. The façade contains a monumental doorway in the center and a bench at its base. Two steps lead up to the main entrance and a corridor flanked by upright megaliths of coralline limestone.

Plan of the Ta' Ħaġrat complex. Legend: (A)Temple 3600-3300 BC, (B) Temple 3600-3300 BC, (1) Entrance 2d temple, (2) Abside of the oracle.

The corridor leads into a central torba (a cement-like material) court, radiating three semi-circular chambers. These were partially walled off at some time in the Saflieni phase; pottery shards were recovered from the internal packing of this wall. The apses are constructed with roughly-hewn stone walls and have a rock floor. Corbelling visible on the walls of the apses suggest that the temple was roofed.

A small, sculptured model of a temple carved from globigerina limestone was discovered here in 1923.

=== Minor temple ===
The Saflieni phase temple rests to the north and is six and a half meters long. It is entered through the eastern apse of the larger temple. Smaller stones have been used in its construction and it exhibits irregularities in design considered archaic or provincial.

== Excavation ==
The site was excavated between 1923 and 1926 by Sir Temi Zammit, then Director of Museums. The site was again excavated by John Davies Evans in 1954, and British archaeologist David H. Trump accurately dated the complex in the 1961 excavation.

The temple was included on the Antiquities List of 1925.

== Restoration ==
Parts of the façade and doorway were reconstructed in 1937.

== See also ==
- List of megalithic sites
