= Saflieni phase =

Archaeological phase of Maltese prehistory

e hMaltese prehistoric chronology (Based on recalibrated radiocarbon dating)
Period	Phase	Dates BC c.
Neolithic (5900–4100 BC)	Għar Dalam	5900–4500 BC
Neolithic (5900–4100 BC)	Grey Skorba	4500–4400 BC
Neolithic (5900–4100 BC)	Red Skorba	4400–4100 BC
Temple Period (4100–2500 BC)	Żebbuġ	4100–3800 BC
Temple Period (4100–2500 BC)	Mġarr	3800–3600 BC
Temple Period (4100–2500 BC)	Ġgantija	3600–3000 BC
Temple Period (4100–2500 BC)	Saflieni	3300–3000 BC
Temple Period (4100–2500 BC)	Tarxien	3000–2500 BC
Bronze Age (2500–700 BC)	Tarxien Cemetery	2500–1500 BC
Bronze Age (2500–700 BC)	Borġ in-Nadur	1500–700 BC
Bronze Age (2500–700 BC)	Baħrija	900–700 BC

The Saflieni phase is one of the eleven phases of Maltese prehistory, the fourth of five in the middle or Temple period. It is named for the Ħal Saflieni Hypogeum, an underground temple complex now recognised as a World Heritage Site by UNESCO, which was built mainly in this period.

== Overview ==
The Saflieni phase, from approximately 3300–3000 BC, is a brief transitional phase between the Ġgantija and Tarxien phases, the two main phases during which the principal Megalithic temples of Malta were built. Saflieni-phase ceramics may provide a useful indication of separation between the two long phases. They have been recovered from a number of Megalithic sites, including: the top level of the remains at Santa Verna at Xagħra in Gozo; from the eastern part of the temple of Ta' Ħaġrat in Mġarr; and from the lower levels of the east temple at Skorba.
