= Ħal Saflieni Hypogeum =

Neolithic subterranean structure in Malta

Hypogeum of Ħal Saflieni
- Ħal Saflieni Prehistoric Hypogeum (official name)
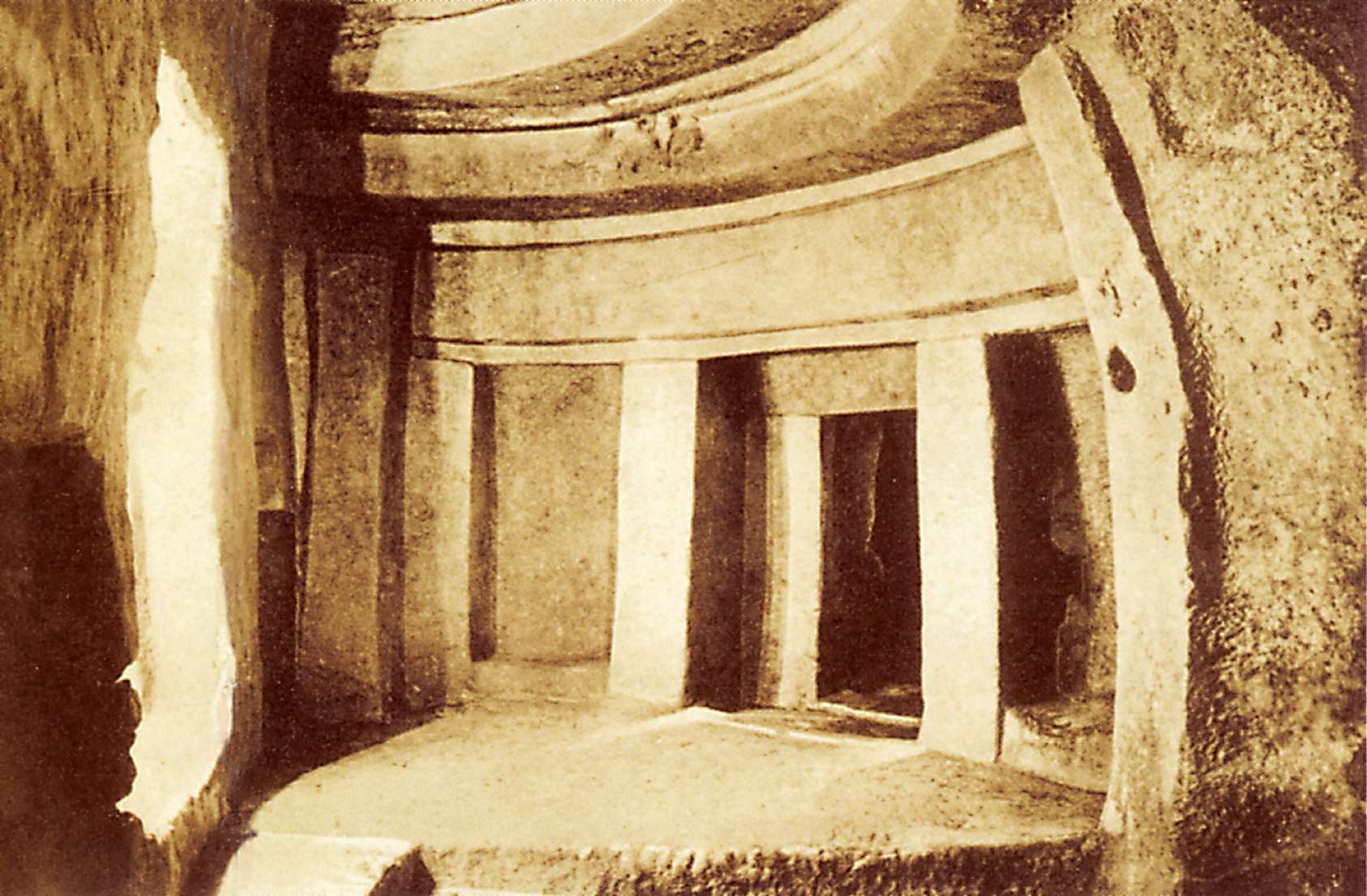
- The Hypogeum, photograph by Richard Ellis, before 1910

- Location within Malta
- 35°52′10.5″N 14°30′24.5″E
- Periods: Saflieni phase
- Location: Paola, Malta

History
- Built: c. 4000 BC (earliest remains)
- Abandoned: c. 2500 BC

Site notes
- Material: Limestone
- Area: 500 m^{2} (5,400 sq ft)
- Excavation dates: 1903–1908, 1990–1993
- Archaeologists: Manuel Magri; Themistocles Zammit
- Condition: Preserved and restored in 2017
- Owner: Government of Malta
- Management: Heritage Malta
- Public access: Yes (limited)
- Website: Heritage Malta

UNESCO World Heritage Site
- Official name: Ħal Saflieni Hypogeum
- Type: Cultural
- Criteria: iii
- Designated: 1980 (4th session)
- Reference no.: 130
- Region: Europe and North America

The Hypogeum of Ħal Saflieni (Maltese: Ipoġew ta' Ħal Saflieni [ɪpɔˈd͡ʒɛʊ̯ tɐ ħɐl sɐfˈlɪːnɪ]) is a Neolithic subterranean structure dating to the Saflieni phase (3300 – 3000 BC) in Maltese prehistory, located in Paola, Malta. It is often simply referred to as the Hypogeum, literally meaning "underground" in Greek. The Hypogeum is thought to have been a sanctuary and necropolis, with the estimated remains of more than 7,000 people documented by archeologists, and is among the best preserved examples of the Maltese temple building culture that also produced the Megalithic Temples and Xagħra Stone Circle.

== Etymology ==
This hypogeum (Hellenic Υπό+ Γαία meaning Under+ Earth) is named for the locality under which it lies, namely Ħal Saflieni, a village that no longer exists. Ħal means "village" and saflieni means "low"; as both words are of Berber origin, the name "Ħal Saflieni" may have appeared after Muslims came to Malta. Themistocles Zammit considers the village name a misnomer because the locality is on the top of a hill. However, Ħal Saflieni is indeed lower than the nearby village Ħal Fuqani (fuqani means "high") located between Tarxien and Luqa.

== History ==
The Hypogeum was discovered by accident in 1902 when workers cutting cisterns for a new housing development broke through its roof. The workers tried to hide the temple at first, but eventually it was found. The study of the structure was first conducted by Manuel Magri, who directed the excavations on behalf of the Museums Committee, starting from November 1903. During the excavations, a portion of the contents of the Hypogeum, including grave goods and human remains, were emptied out and discarded without being properly catalogued. Magri's death in 1907 while conducting missionary work in Tunisia further complicated matters and his report on the Hypogeum was lost.

Excavation continued under Sir Themistocles Zammit, who attempted to salvage what he could. Zammit began publishing a series of reports in 1910 and continued excavating until 1911, depositing his findings at the National Museum of Archaeology in Valletta. The Hypogeum was first opened to visitors in 1908 while the excavations were ongoing. Queen Mary and Sir Leslie Rundle visited in 1912.

The four contemporary houses built on the site of the hypogeum were demolished to build a museum. Further excavations took place between 1990 and 1993 by Anthony Pace, Nathaniel Cutajar and Reuben Grima. The Hypogeum was then closed to visitors between 1991 and 2000 for restoration works and to arrange it for visits; and since its reopening, Heritage Malta (the government body that looks after historical sites) allows entry to only 80 people per day, while the site's microclimate is strictly regulated. In 2011, a more intensive program was launched to monitor the decay of the site. Scientific research on the Hypogeum is ongoing, and in 2014, an international team of scientists visited to study acoustics.

The Hypogeum reopened in May 2017 after closing for a year to improve its environmental management system.

== Description ==
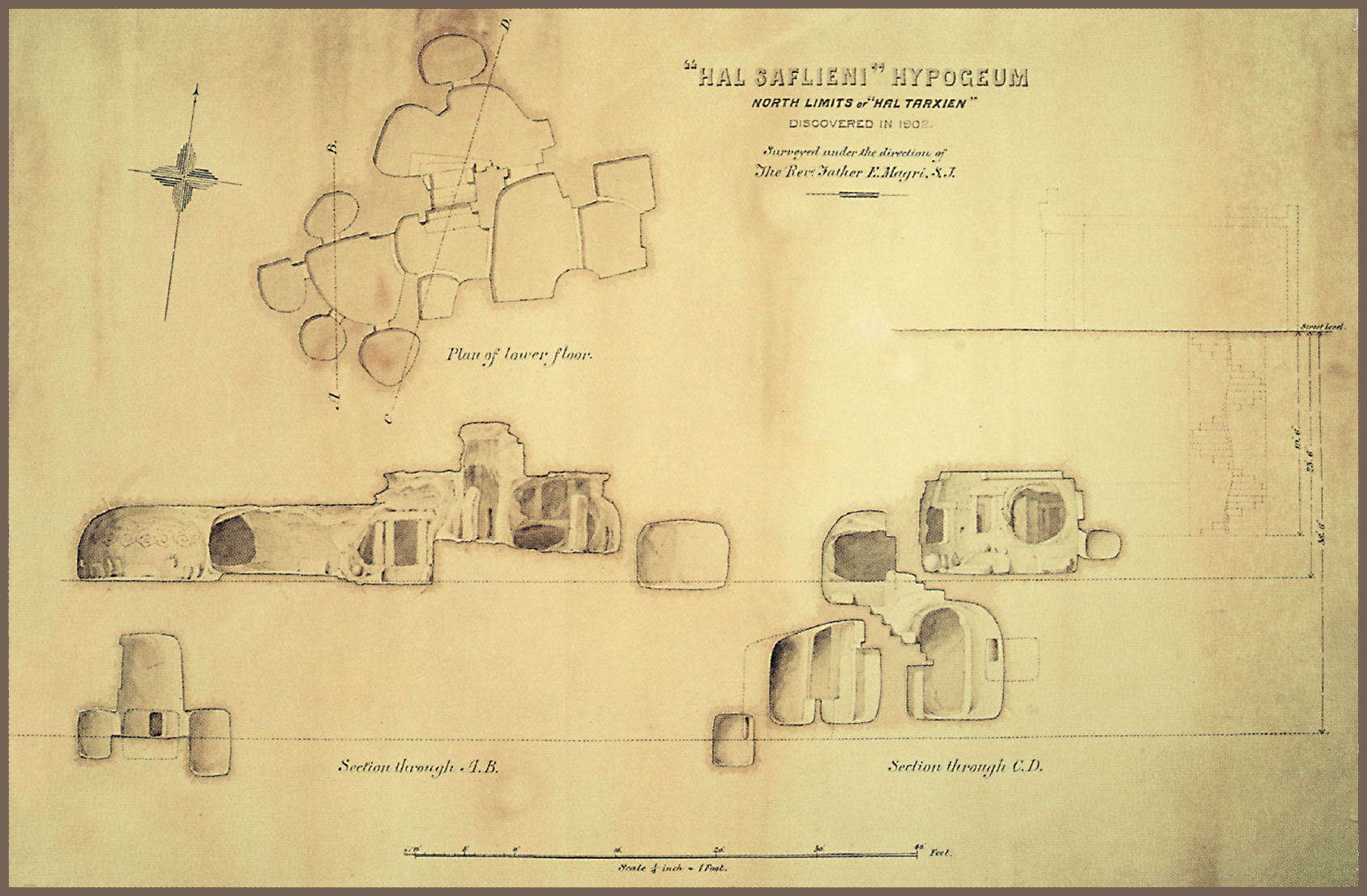
Site map of the Hypogeum made in October 1907

Later archeological excavations indicate there was once a surface shrine that marked the entrance to the Hypogeum, with its subsequent destruction likely shielding the lower structure from discovery for thousands of years. Nothing remains of any potential enclosure that would have marked the entry to the Hypogeum. The underground structure may have originated from a natural cave, expanded over time by cutting directly into the rock with crude tools including antlers, flint, chert and obsidian. Burial chambers in the upper level of the Hypogeum date from the early phases of the Maltese Temple Period, with lower chambers dating from later. The site may have first been used as early as 4000 BC, and was likely used until around 2500 BC, based on pottery sample analysis and examination of human remains.

The temple structure uses a careful direction of light from the surface to penetrate into the lower chambers, with intricate patterns painted on portions of the ceiling with red ochre, following motifs of spots, spirals and honeycombs. One of the main chambers, called "The Holy of Holies", appears to be oriented so that light from the winter solstice illuminated its facade from the original opening above.

A resonance niche cut in the middle chamber, called the Oracle Room, was possibly designed to project chanting or drumming throughout the rest of the Hypogeum.

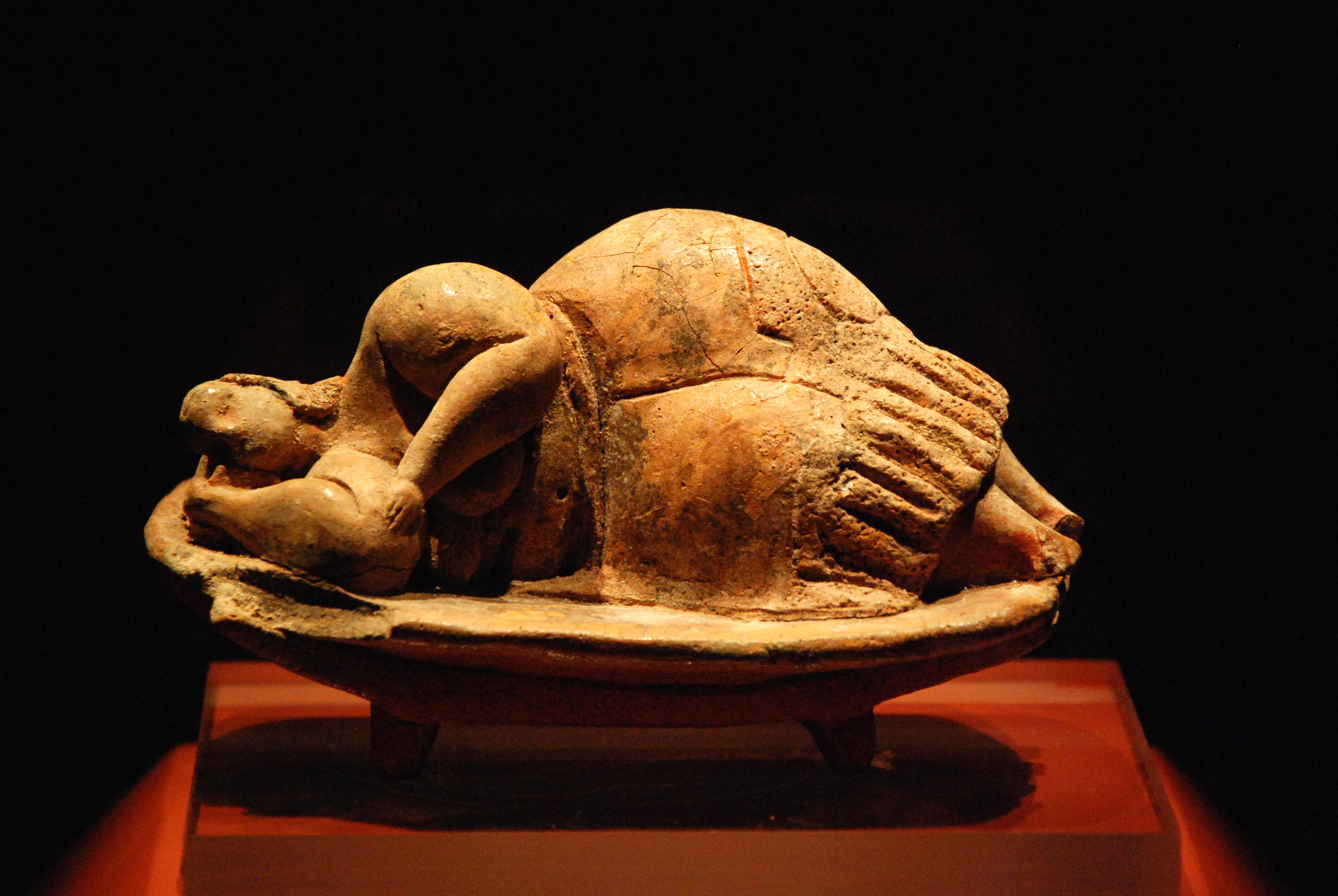
The Sleeping Lady of Ħal Saflieni, National Museum of Archaeology, Valletta

A broad range of objects were recovered from the site, including intricately decorated pottery vessels, stone and clay beads, shell buttons, amulets, axe-heads, and carved figures depicting humans and animals. The most notable discovery was the Sleeping Lady, a clay figure thought to represent a mother goddess. The figures range from abstract to realistic in style, with major themes thought to be related to veneration of the dead and spiritual transformation. Complex artistic techniques are also represented, as in the case of a single large pottery bowl which utilized both naturalistic and stylized themes, with one side realistically depicting bovines, pigs and goats, and the other side representing hatched animals hidden within complex geometric patterns.

It is estimated that the remains of 7,000 individuals were found in the Hypogeum, and though many of the bones were lost early in excavation, most of the skulls were deposited at the National Museum. A small percentage of the skulls have an abnormal cranial elongation, similar to priestly skulls from Ancient Egypt, fueling speculation about the people who occupied the Hypogeum, and their practices and beliefs.

== Structure ==
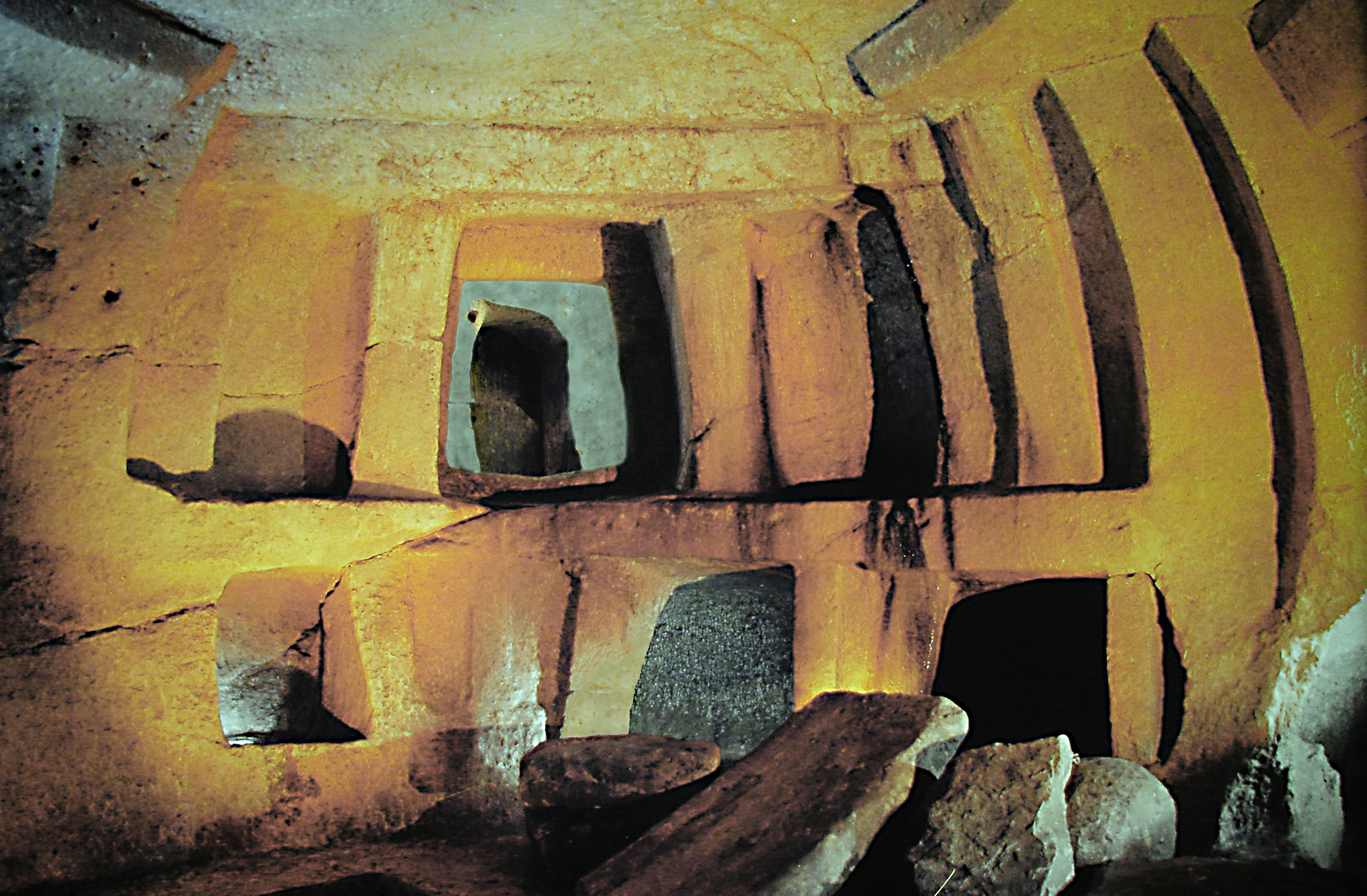
Limestone doorways

The Hypogeum is constructed entirely underground and consists of three superimposed levels hewn into soft globigerina limestone, with its halls and chambers interconnected through a labyrinthine series of steps, lintels and doorways. The upper level is thought to have been occupied first, with the middle and lower levels expanded and excavated later. Some of the middle chambers appear to share stylistic characteristics with the contemporaneous Megalithic Temples found across Malta.

=== Upper level ===
The first level is only one metre below the surface, and it is very different from tombs hidden in Malta, near Rabat. Some rooms are natural caves which were later extended. This level contains many rooms, some of which were used for burial.

=== Middle level ===
The second level is a later expansion, with the rock hoisted up to the surface by Cyclopean rigging. This level features several noted rooms:

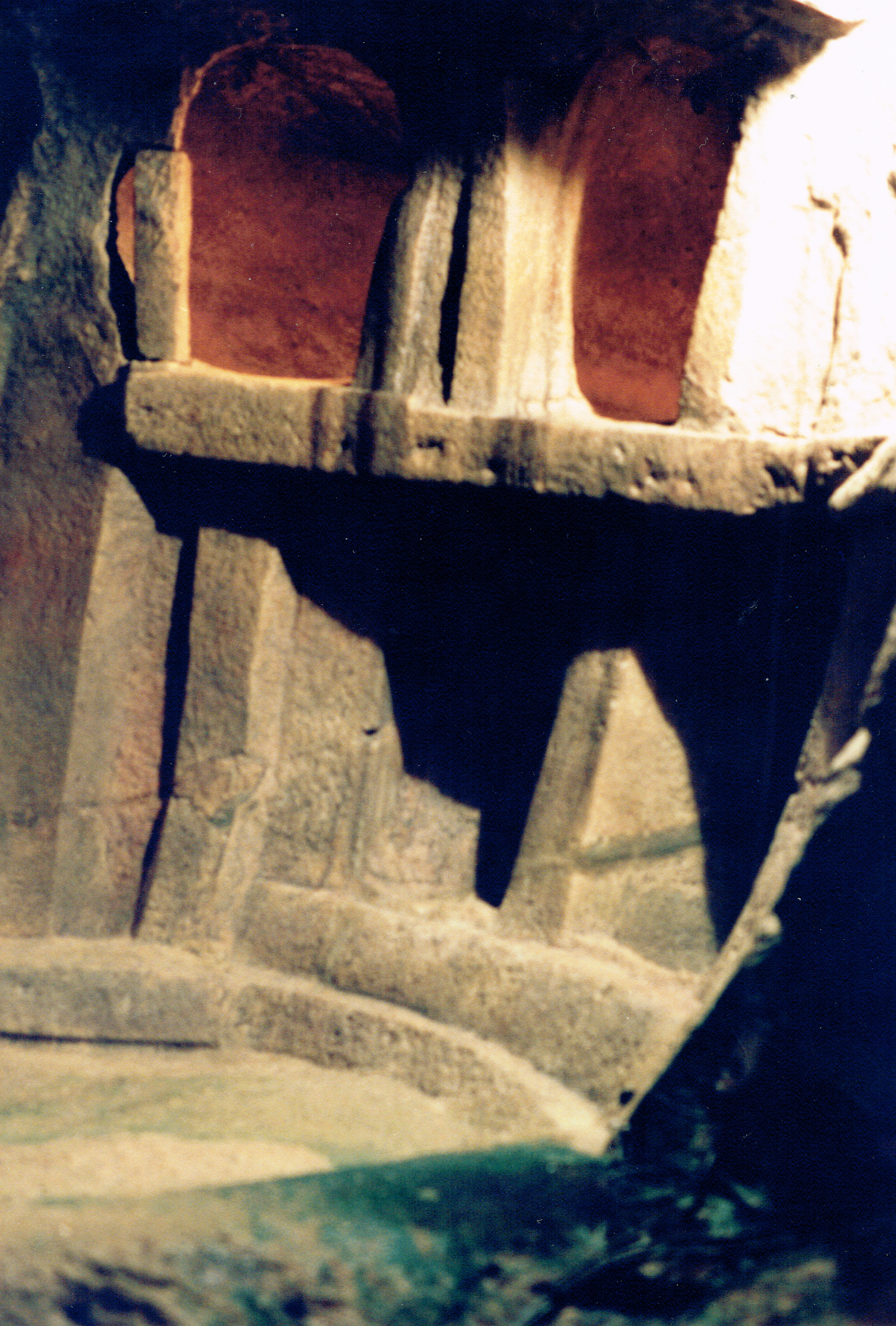
The Holy of Holies

- Main Chamber: This chamber is roughly circular and carved out from rock. A number of trilithon entrances are represented, some blind, and others leading to another chamber. Most of the wall surface has received a red wash of ochre. It was from this room that the Sleeping Lady was recovered.
- Oracle Room: This is roughly rectangular and one of the smallest side chambers. It has the peculiarity of producing a powerful acoustic resonance from any vocalization made inside it. This room has an elaborately painted ceiling, consisting of spirals in red ochre with circular spots and spirals.
- Decorated Room: Near the Oracle Room is another spacious hall, circular, with inward slanting smooth walls, richly decorated in a geometrical pattern of spirals. On the right side wall of the entrance is a petrosomatoglyph of a human hand carved into the rock (Agius).
- Holy of Holies: Perhaps the central structure of the Hypogeum, this room appears to be oriented toward the winter solstice, which would have illuminated its facade from the original surface opening. No bones were recovered from this room during excavations. The focal point is a porthole within a trilithon, or structure consisting of two large vertical stones, which is in turn framed within a larger trilithon and yet another large trilithon. The corbelled ceiling has been taken as a hint that Malta's surface temples, now uncovered, could have been roofed similarly.

=== Lower level ===
The lower story contained no bones or offerings.

== Museum ==
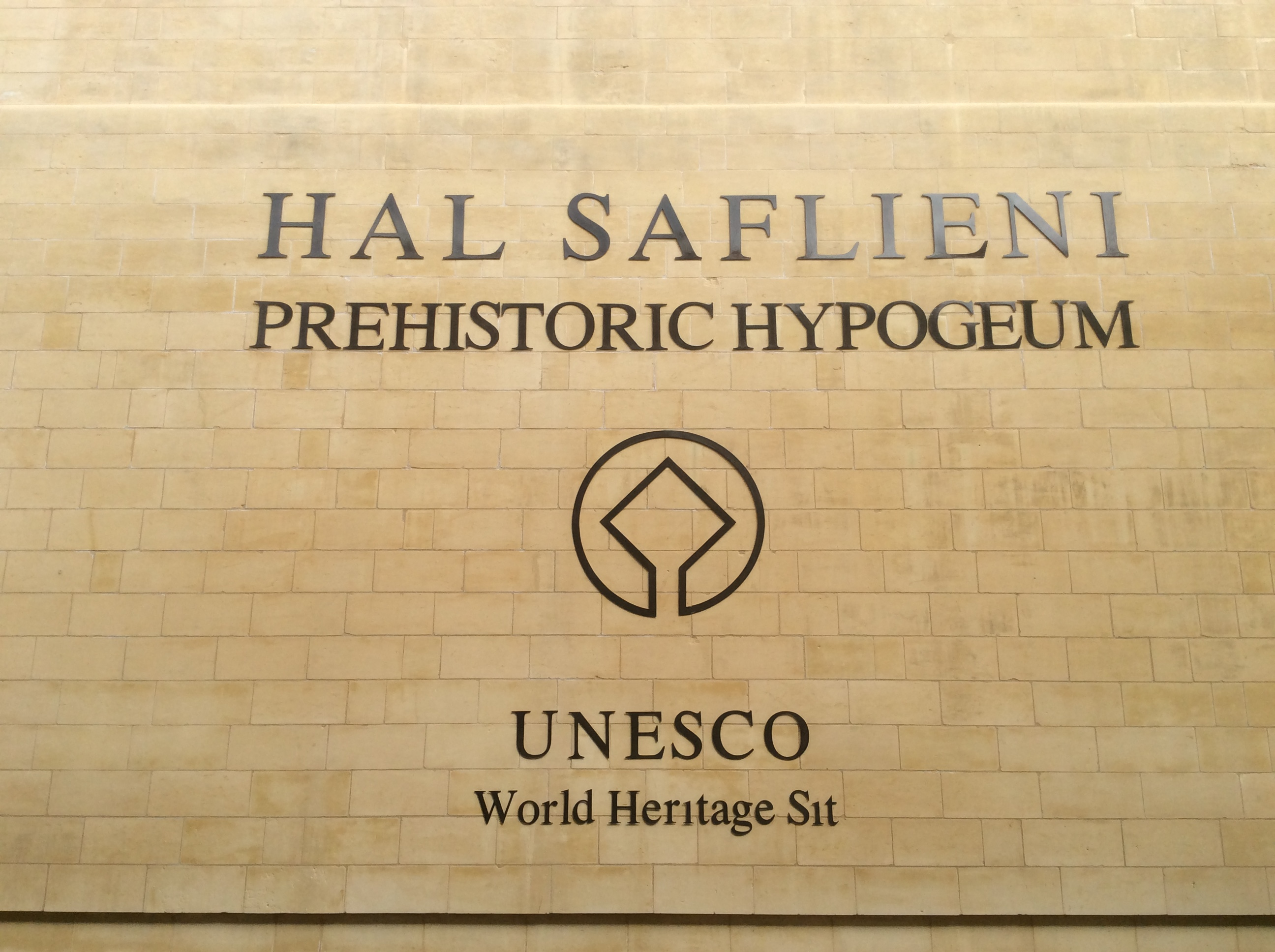
The facade of the museum after restoration in 2017

The Hal Saflieni prehistoric Hypogeum site is a very popular attraction in Malta . Due to conservation considerations, only very few visitors ( 80 ) are allowed in every day. For this reason, it is highly recommended that tickets are booked on-line, months in advance.

The site is open from 09:00 during the winter and 10:00 for the rest of the year.

Twenty Last-Minute tickets can be purchased , one day before , but only from Fort St. Elmo in Valletta & the Gozo museum of Archeology. This is only applicable till noon. After noon, these last minute tickets can also be obtained from other Heritage Malta sites/museums; these are National Museum of Archaeology, Domus Romana and Hypogeum itself.

The site closed in September 2016 for a €1.1 million renovation partly financed by a grant from Iceland, Norway and Liechtenstein. The renovated museum was inaugurated by the Maltese Minister for Culture on 28 April 2017 and includes a new climate control system for the Hypogeum as well as an expanded visitor centre. The site reopened to visitors on 15 May 2017.

== Depiction on coins ==
The Hypogeum is depicted on the obverse of a commemorative 2 Euros coin as part of the Maltese Prehistoric Sites series that was struck in 2022.

== See also ==
- Xagħra Stone Circle
- Ġgantija
- Petrosomatoglyph
- World Heritage Sites
- List of World Heritage Sites in Western Europe
- Early and simple domes
