= Manuel Magri =

Emmanuel Magri (also known as Manuel or Manwel; 27 February 1851 in Valletta – 29 March 1907 in Sfax) was a Maltese ethnographer, archaeologist and writer.

Magri gave a significant contribution as a scholar through his collection of Maltese folk tales and lore. Working at the end of the 19th and the turn of the 20th centuries, Magri's work saved for posterity ethnographic material which would have otherwise been lost through modernisation and more widespread education.

Magri was also one of Malta's pioneers in archaeology. He was a member of the first Committee of Management of the Museum of Malta alongside Antonio Annetto Caruana, N. Tagliaferro and Temi Zammit. Magri was entrusted with the excavation of the Hypogeum of Ħal-Saflieni, a Megalithic Temple in Xewkija (Gozo), and a number of other sites in Malta and Gozo. However, during the excavations, a portion of the contents of the Hypogeum, including grave goods and human remains, were emptied out and discarded without being properly catalogued. To confound things further, Magri died in 1907 while conducting missionary work in Tunisia and his report on the Hypogeum was lost.

Born on 27 February 1851 in Valletta, Magri joined the Society of Jesus, in 1871. He was ordained priest in 1881 in Tortosa (Spain), and made the solemn profession of the last vows on 15 August 1890, in Istanbul. As a Jesuit, Magri taught in a number of Jesuit colleges in Malta and Turkey. He also served as Assistant of the Provincial of Sicily (1898–1902) and as Rector of the Seminary in Gozo (1902–1906). Magri died unexpectedly on 29 March 1907 in Sfax, Tunisia, where he had gone to preach Lenten exercises and celebrate Easter with the Maltese community.

== See also ==
- List of Jesuit scientists
- List of Roman Catholic scientist-clerics
