= Tarxien Cemetery phase =

Part of Maltese prehistory (Bronze Age)

e hMaltese prehistoric chronology (Based on recalibrated radiocarbon dating)
Period	Phase	Dates BC c.
Neolithic (5900–4100 BC)	Għar Dalam	5900–4500 BC
Neolithic (5900–4100 BC)	Grey Skorba	4500–4400 BC
Neolithic (5900–4100 BC)	Red Skorba	4400–4100 BC
Temple Period (4100–2500 BC)	Żebbuġ	4100–3800 BC
Temple Period (4100–2500 BC)	Mġarr	3800–3600 BC
Temple Period (4100–2500 BC)	Ġgantija	3600–3000 BC
Temple Period (4100–2500 BC)	Saflieni	3300–3000 BC
Temple Period (4100–2500 BC)	Tarxien	3000–2500 BC
Bronze Age (2500–700 BC)	Tarxien Cemetery	2500–1500 BC
Bronze Age (2500–700 BC)	Borġ in-Nadur	1500–700 BC
Bronze Age (2500–700 BC)	Baħrija	900–700 BC

The Tarxien Cemetery phase is one of the eleven phases of Maltese prehistory. It is named for the Bronze Age burials on the site of the Tarxien temple complex near the village of Ħal Tarxien.

The Tarxien Cemetery phase, from approximately 2500 to 1500 BCE, follows the Tarxien phase, the last phase of the Temple period during which the principal megalithic temples of Malta were built. The culture is characterised not by large-scale temple building, but by dolmens and cremation cemeteries.
