= David H. Trump =

British archaeologist

David Hilary Trump
- Born: August 27, 1931
- Died: August 31, 2016 (aged 85)
- Awards: National Order of Merit

Academic background
- Education: Pembroke College, Cambridge

Academic work
- Discipline: Archaeology
- Institutions: National Museum of Archaeology, Malta; University of Cambridge

David Hilary Trump (August 27, 1931 – August 31, 2016) was a British archaeologist known for his work in the area of Maltese prehistory. In 1954, Trump helped John Davies Evans excavate at Ġgantija. He took part in the excavation of many important sites in Maltese prehistory, including the Skorba Temples and Xagħra Stone Circle . From 1958–1963, he was a curator at the National Museum of Archaeology, Malta. He retired in 1997. He was awarded the National Order of Merit by Malta in 2004.

== Selected bibliography ==
- Skorba: A Neolithic Temple in Malta, Society of Antiquaries of London
- Skorba, Oxford University Press (1966)
- Malta : an Archaeological Guide, Faber et Faber, Londres (1972)
- The Penguin Dictionary of Archaeology, Penguin Books Ltd (1972) ISBN 978-0-14-051045-4
- Malta, Nagel Publishers (1980)
- Prehistory of the Mediterranean, Yale University Press (1980) ISBN 978-0-7139-1304-0
- Malta, Prehistory and Temples, Midsea Books Ltd (2003)
- Greece and Rome Victorious, 500 B.C.-200 B.C, Macmillan Publishers
- The American Heritage Guide to Archaeology, American Heritage Press
- A Dictionary of Archaeology, Penguin Books Ltd,
- Ancient Rome, Granada Publishing
- The Atlas of Early Man, Macmillan Publishers Ltd
- Cart-Ruts and their impact on the Maltese landscape, Heritage Books (2008)
