= Mġarr phase =

Prehistoric period in Malta

e hMaltese prehistoric chronology (Based on recalibrated radiocarbon dating)
Period	Phase	Dates BC c.
Neolithic (5900–4100 BC)	Għar Dalam	5900–4500 BC
Neolithic (5900–4100 BC)	Grey Skorba	4500–4400 BC
Neolithic (5900–4100 BC)	Red Skorba	4400–4100 BC
Temple Period (4100–2500 BC)	Żebbuġ	4100–3800 BC
Temple Period (4100–2500 BC)	Mġarr	3800–3600 BC
Temple Period (4100–2500 BC)	Ġgantija	3600–3000 BC
Temple Period (4100–2500 BC)	Saflieni	3300–3000 BC
Temple Period (4100–2500 BC)	Tarxien	3000–2500 BC
Bronze Age (2500–700 BC)	Tarxien Cemetery	2500–1500 BC
Bronze Age (2500–700 BC)	Borġ in-Nadur	1500–700 BC
Bronze Age (2500–700 BC)	Baħrija	900–700 BC

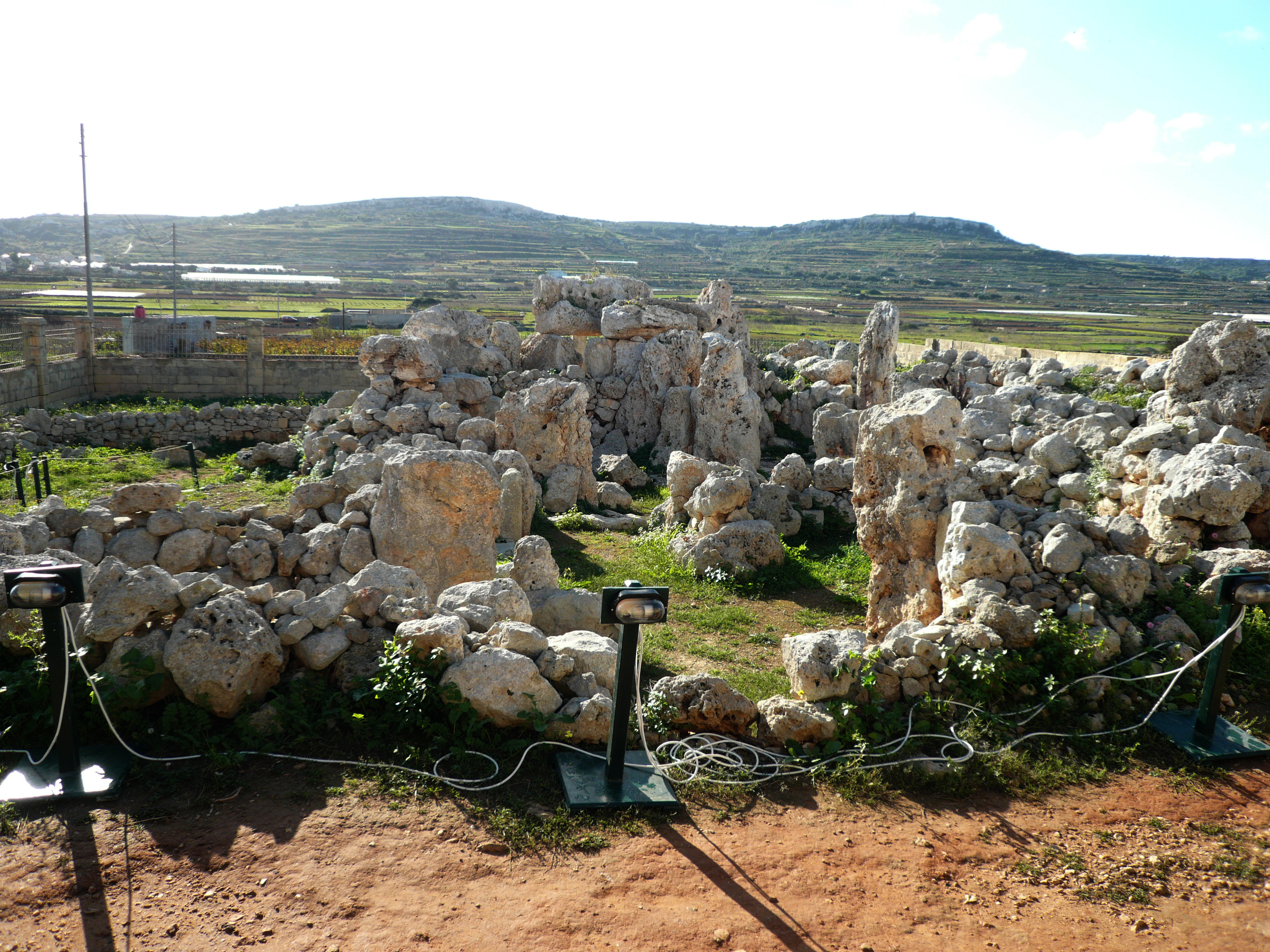
Ta' Hagrat temple in the village of Mgarr, Malta

The Mġarr phase is one of the eleven phases of Maltese prehistory. It is named for the town of Mġarr, in the west of the island, where pottery older than the Ta' Ħaġrat temple complex was found.

The Mġarr phase, approximately 3800-3600 BCE, follows the Żebbuġ phase in the Temple period, and precedes the three phases, the Ġgantija, Saflieni and Tarxien phases, during which the principal megalithic temples of Malta were built.
