= Għar Dalam phase =

Phase of Maltese prehistory

e hMaltese prehistoric chronology (Based on recalibrated radiocarbon dating)
Period	Phase	Dates BC c.
Neolithic (5900–4100 BC)	Għar Dalam	5900–4500 BC
Neolithic (5900–4100 BC)	Grey Skorba	4500–4400 BC
Neolithic (5900–4100 BC)	Red Skorba	4400–4100 BC
Temple Period (4100–2500 BC)	Żebbuġ	4100–3800 BC
Temple Period (4100–2500 BC)	Mġarr	3800–3600 BC
Temple Period (4100–2500 BC)	Ġgantija	3600–3000 BC
Temple Period (4100–2500 BC)	Saflieni	3300–3000 BC
Temple Period (4100–2500 BC)	Tarxien	3000–2500 BC
Bronze Age (2500–700 BC)	Tarxien Cemetery	2500–1500 BC
Bronze Age (2500–700 BC)	Borġ in-Nadur	1500–700 BC
Bronze Age (2500–700 BC)	Baħrija	900–700 BC

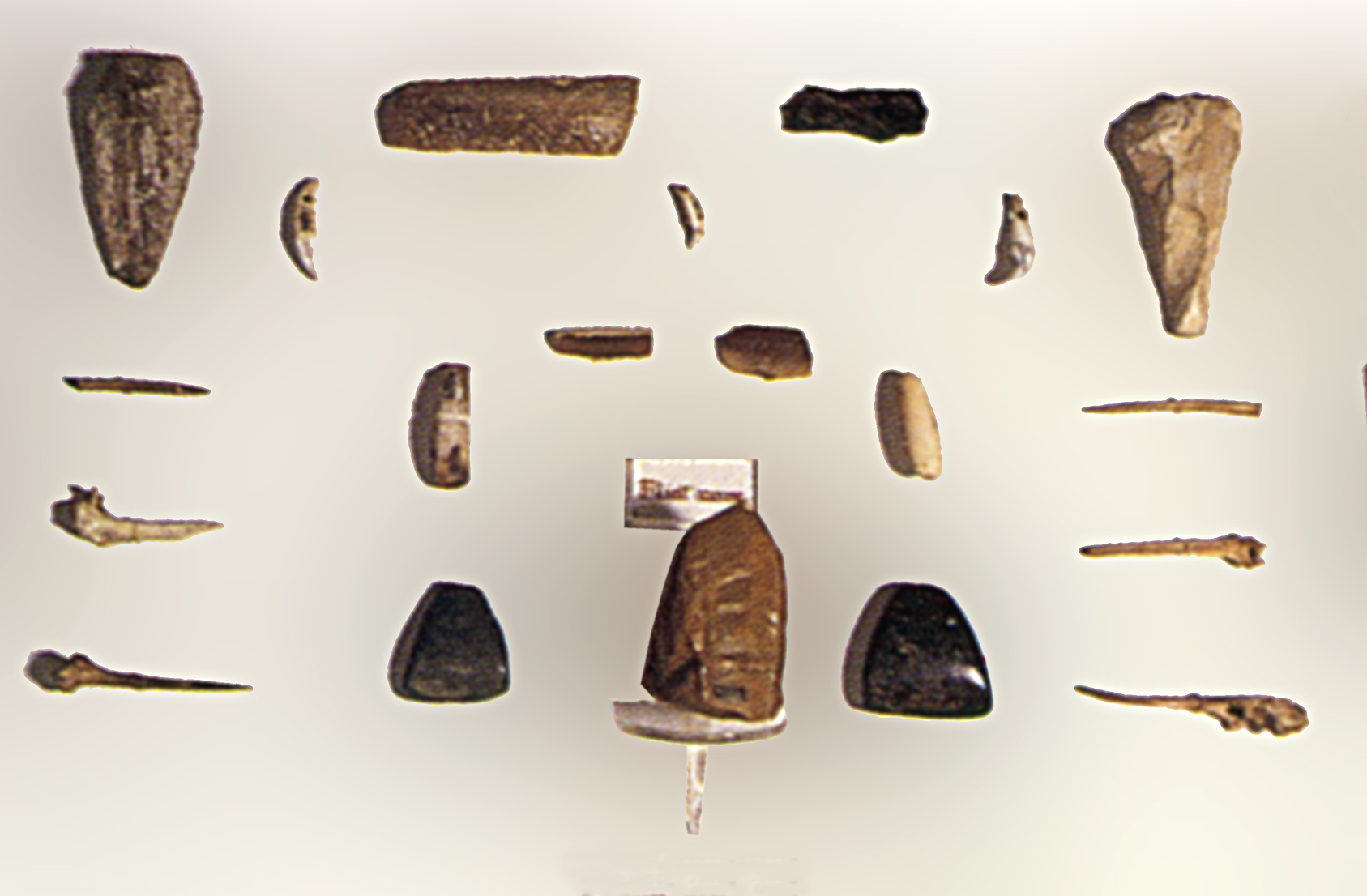
Artifacts from Għar Dalam

The Għar Dalam phase, from approximately 5000 to 4100 BC, is the first of the eleven phases of Maltese prehistory, representing the earliest phase of the Neolithic occupation of the islands. It is named for Għar Dalam, a cave in the Wied id-Dalam, near Birżebbuġa, in the south-east of the island.
