= Tarxien phase =

e hMaltese prehistoric chronology (Based on recalibrated radiocarbon dating)
| Period | Phase | Dates BC c. |
| Neolithic (5900–4100 BC) | Għar Dalam | 5900–4500 BC |
| Neolithic (5900–4100 BC) | Grey Skorba | 4500–4400 BC |
| Neolithic (5900–4100 BC) | Red Skorba | 4400–4100 BC |
| Temple Period (4100–2500 BC) | Żebbuġ | 4100–3800 BC |
| Temple Period (4100–2500 BC) | Mġarr | 3800–3600 BC |
| Temple Period (4100–2500 BC) | Ġgantija | 3600–3000 BC |
| Temple Period (4100–2500 BC) | Saflieni | 3300–3000 BC |
| Temple Period (4100–2500 BC) | Tarxien | 3000–2500 BC |
| Bronze Age (2500–700 BC) | Tarxien Cemetery | 2500–1500 BC |
| Bronze Age (2500–700 BC) | Borġ in-Nadur | 1500–700 BC |
| Bronze Age (2500–700 BC) | Baħrija | 900–700 BC |

The Tarxien phase is one of the eleven phases of Maltese prehistory. It is named for the temple complex discovered near the village of Ħal Tarxien, and now recognised as a World Heritage Site by UNESCO.

The Tarxien phase, from approximately 3000 to 2500 BCE, follows the Saflieni phase and is the last phase of the Temple period, during which the principal megalithic temples of Malta were built.
