= Kordin Temples =

Megalithic temple complex in Malta

The Kordin Temples are a group of megalithic temples on Corradino Heights in Paola, Malta. The temples were inhabited from pre-history, by Phoenicians and then by the Greeks and Roman periods. In the 17th century the site belonged to Giovanni Francesco Abela. He had excavated several sites in the whereabouts, and had his country residence in the area. He had originally planned to write his will to the Order, but eventually left his villa, that was used as Malta's first museum, known as Museo di San Giacomo, and the surrounding lands to the Jesuits. The land still belonged to the Jesuits, until their expulsion in the 18th century by the Order when all their land and property was taken by the treasury. The site was excavated during the Order of St. John on the order of Grand Master Manuel Pinto da Fonseca by archeologist Gio Antonio Barbaro. The temples were then extensively excavated by Sir Themistocles Zammit during the British period.

Originally there were three temple complexes, but two of these have been destroyed, and only the site of Kordin III survives. The remains were included on the Antiquities List of 1925.

The temples are located on a plateau overlooking the Grand Harbour, originally called Kortin during the Order of St. John and now Kordin or Corradino. Other megalithic sites in the vicinity include the Hypogeum of Ħal-Saflieni and the Tarxien Temples.

== Kordin I ==
Kordin I Temple
- Interactive map of Kordin I Temple
- 35°52′52.5″N 14°30′17.8″E
- Type: Temple
- Location: Corradino, Paola, Malta
- Part of: Megalithic Temples of Malta

Site notes
- Material: Limestone
- Excavation dates: 1880s–1909
- Archaeologists: Antonio Annetto Caruana; Themistocles Zammit; Thomas Ashby; Thomas Eric Peet
- Condition: Destroyed

Kordin I was located on a terrace on the west slopes of Corradino Heights, overlooking Marsa. It consisted of small and irregular rooms, and was poorly preserved when it was discovered. It was first surveyed in the 1880s. The first excavations were made by Antonio Annetto Caruana, and were continued under Themistocles Zammit in 1908, and Thomas Ashby and Thomas Eric Peet in 1909.

The temple was open to the elements and aerial bombardment during World War II. Virtually nothing remained by the 1950s, and the temple was obliterated after an industrial estate was built on the site in the 1960s.

== Kordin II ==
Kordin II Temple
- Interactive map of Kordin II Temple
- 35°52′52.3″N 14°30′22.4″E
- Type: Temple
- Location: Corradino, Paola, Malta
- Part of: Megalithic Temples of Malta

Site notes
- Material: Limestone
- Excavation dates: 1840–1909
- Archaeologists: Cesare Vassallo; Antonio Annetto Caruana; Albert Mayer; Thomas Ashby; Thomas Eric Peet
- Condition: Destroyed

Kordin II was located on the northern extent of Corradino, 137 metres away from Kordin I. It was used throughout the entire temple period, since pottery from all phases was found at the site. The chronology was difficult to figure out, and whether the entire building could be dated to the temple period is debatable.

The first investigations of Kordin II were undertaken by Cesare Vassallo in 1840. The site was first excavated properly by Antonio Annetto Caruana in 1892, and excavation work continued by Albert Mayer in 1901 and was finished by Thomas Ashby and Thomas Eric Peet in 1908 and 1909.

Part of the temple was destroyed by the Royal Engineers in 1871 to make way for the ditch of the Corradino Lines, before excavation even began. The temple was further damaged by aerial bombardment during World War II, and no remains of the temple could be seen by the 1950s. In the 1960s, the site was built up as an industrial estate.

== Kordin III ==
Kordin III Temple
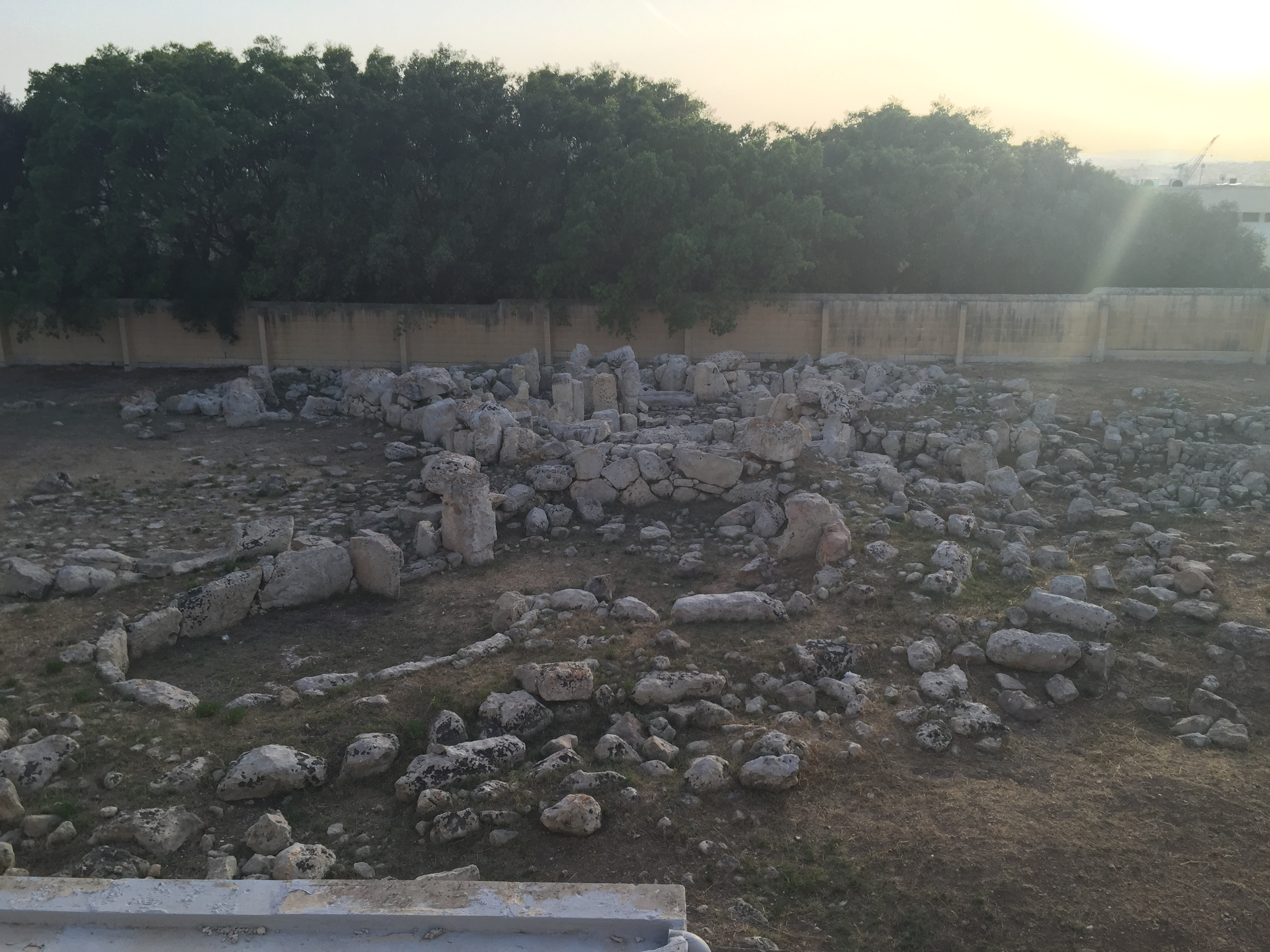
- View of Kordin III
- Interactive map of Kordin III Temple
- 35°52′37.5″N 14°30′32.4″E
- Type: Temple
- Periods: Mġarr phase Ġgantija phase Tarxien phase
- Location: Corradino, Paola, Malta
- Part of: Megalithic Temples of Malta

History
- Built: c.3700 BC
- Abandoned: c.2500 BC

Site notes
- Material: Limestone
- Excavation dates: 1870s–1961 2015–present
- Archaeologists: Cesare Vassallo; Antonio Annetto Caruana; Thomas Ashby; Thomas Eric Peet; John Davies Evans; David Trump; Caroline Malone
- Condition: Ruins (poorly preserved)
- Owner: Government of Malta
- Management: Heritage Malta
- Public access: By appointment

Kordin III is the only temple on Corradino whose remains have survived. It is located just outside the Corradino Lines, close to the Church of St. Anthony of Padua and Mariam Al-Batool Mosque.

=== Site ===
The Kordin III complex consists of two temples. The larger one has a standard 3-apse plan, typical of Ġgantija phase design. The temple has a concave facade, with the forecourt and entrance passage to the central court being stone-paved. This stone paving is unique to Kordin III, as this has not been found in any other temples of Malta. Behind the temple are some small rooms, which were possibly used as storerooms but could have also been an irregular minor temple. The first part of the temple is believed to have been built in around 3700 BC, during the Mġarr phase. Most of the structure dates back to the Ġgantija phase, and the complex was still in use during the Tarxien phase, when the facade was rebuilt. The site is believed to have been abandoned in around 2500 BC.

A 2.75 metre-long trough was found lying across the entrance to the temple's left apse, and this is generally considered as the most notable feature of the site. The trough has seven deep transverse grooves produced by grinding. It is made of hard limestone brought from over 2 kilometres away so it is highly probable that it was for grinding corn (a multiple quern) and contemporary with the temple, rather than for grinding 'deffun', the traditional Maltese roofing material, which would make it considerably more recent.

=== Excavations and recent history ===
The site was cleared from debris by Cesare Vassallo in the 1870s. Antonio Annetto Caruana discovered further clusters of megalithic monuments in the area in 1882, and the site was properly excavated by Thomas Ashby and Thomas Eric Peet in 1909. Other excavations were undertaken by John Davies Evans in 1953 and by David Trump in 1961.

A walled enclosure was built around the temple in 1925, and it is kept locked to give it maximum protection. Like Kordin I and II, the temple was also damaged in World War II, but its remains were not built over after the war and can still be seen today.

Although in poor condition, the temple is one of the most complete of the minor temples. In 2009, the viability of extending the World Heritage listing to Kordin III was examined.

New excavations of the area around the temple began in 2015 by Caroline Malone and a team of students from the University of Malta.

The site was managed by Fondazzjoni Wirt Artna until 2016, when it was handed to Heritage Malta. It is open to the public by appointment.

== Kordin IV and V ==
Two other megalithic sites known as Kordin IV and Kordin V reportedly also existed and were obliterated during the 20th century.
