= Commemorative coins of Malta =

Since introducing its own currency in 1972 Malta has issued a number of commemorative coins. The Jean De La Valette commemorative coins issued in 2007 were the last commemorative coins to be denominated in the Maltese lira (LM) as Malta joined the eurozone on 1 January 2008. Most of the commemorative coins issued by Malta were struck in gold or silver and sometimes in Copper and Nickel alloys.

== 1972 Coinage ==
These were the first commemorative coins to be issued by Malta.

- 1972 Manwel Dimech Silver LM 1
- 1972 Fort St. Angelo (Forti Sant' Anġlu) Silver LM 2
- 1972 Hand-held Torch over map of Malta Gold LM 5
- 1972 Maltese stone charcoal stove (Kenur) Gold LM 10
- 1972 Merill - Malta's National Bird Gold LM 20
- 1972 Neptune Statue (Nettunu) Gold LM 50

== 1973 Coinage ==
- 1973 Sir Temi Zammit Silver LM 1
- 1973 Mdina Gate (Bieb l-Imdina) Silver LM 2
- 1973 Senglea vedette (Gardjola) Gold LM 10
- 1973 Dolphin Fountain (Funtana tad-Dniefel) Gold LM 20
- 1973 Auberge de Castille (Berġa ta' Kastilja) Gold LM 50

== 1974 Coinage ==
- 1974 Francesco Giovanni Abela (Ġan Franġisk Abela) Silver LM 2
- 1974 Cottonera Gate (Bieb Kottoner) Silver LM 4
- 1974 Widnet il-Baħar Gold LM 10
- 1974 Gozo boat with lateen sails (Dgħajsa tal-Latini) Gold LM 20
- 1974 First Romano Maltese Coin Gold LM 50

== 1975 Coinage ==
The 1975 coins were minted twice, with different coats of arms on the reverse.

- 1975 Alfonso Maria Galea Silver LM 2
- 1975 St Agatha's Tower (Torri ta' Sant' Agata) at Qammiegħ Silver LM 4
- 1975 Maltese Falcon Gold LM 10
- 1975 The Fresh Water Crab (Qabru) Gold LM 20
- 1975 Ornamental Stone Balcony (Gallarija tal-Ġebel) Gold LM 50

== 1976 Coinage ==
- 1976 Ġużè Ellul Mercer Silver LM 2
- 1976 Fort Manoel Gate (Bieb il-Forti Manwel) Silver LM 4
- 1976 Swallow Tail Butterfly (Farfett tal-Fejġel) Gold LM 10
- 1976 Kanġu ta' Filfla Gold LM 20
- 1976 Ornamental Maltese door knocker (Ħabbata) Gold LM 50

== 1977 Coinage ==
- 1977 Kelb tal-Fenek Silver LM 1
- 1977 Luigi Preziosi Silver LM 2
- 1977 Xarolla Windmill (Il-Mitħna ta' Xarolla) at Żurrieq Silver LM 5
- 1977 Romano - Maltese Coin Gold LM 25
- 1977 L-Imnara : Maltese Lamp Gold LM 50
- 1977 Les Gavroches' Gold LM 100

== 1979 Coinage ==
- 1979 Foreign Military Facilities in Malta Silver LM 1

== 1981 Coinage ==
- 1981 First World Food Day (Jum Dinji tal-Ikel) Silver LM 2
- 1981 UN Children's Fund (Fonti tal-ĠM għat-Tfal) Silver LM 5

== 1983 Coinage ==
- 1983 Understanding Gold LM 100
- 1983 Architectural Barriers Silver LM 5

== 1984 Coinage ==
- 1984 First World Fisheries Conference Silver LM 5
- 1984 Malta Maritime History Set - Wignacourt (1844) Silver LM 5
- 1984 Malta Maritime History Set - Tigre (1839) Silver LM 5
- 1984 Malta Maritime History Set - Providenza (1848) Silver LM 5
- 1984 Malta Maritime History Set - Strangier (1813) Silver LM 5
- 1984 Decade for Women Silver LM 5

== 1985 Coinage ==
- 1985 Malta Maritime History Set - Malta (1862) Silver LM 5
- 1985 Malta Maritime History Set - Maria Dacoutros (1902) Silver LM 5
- 1985 Malta Maritime History Set - Tagliaferro (1882) Silver LM 5
- 1985 Malta Maritime History Set - L'Isle Adam (1883) Silver LM 5

== 1986 Coinage ==
- 1986 Malta Maritime History Set - Dwejra II (1969) Silver Lm 5
- 1986 Malta Maritime History Set - Knight of Malta (1929) Silver Lm 5
- 1986 Malta Maritime History Set - Saver (1943) Silver Lm 5
- 1986 Malta Maritime History Set - Valletta City (1917) Silver Lm 5

== 1988 Coinage ==
- 1988 20th Anniversary CBM Silver Lm 5

== 1989 Coinage ==
- 1989 25th Anniversary of Malta's Independence Gold Lm 100
- 1989 25th Anniversary of Malta's Independence Silver Lm 2

== 1990 Coinage ==
- 1990 Visit to Malta Pope John Paul II Silver Lm 5
- 1990 EEC - Malta Association Agreement Silver Lm 5

== 1991 Coinage ==
- 1991 Save the Children Fund Silver Lm 5

== 1992 Coinage ==
- 1992 George Cross Silver Lm 5
- 1992 George Cross Gold Lm 25

== 1993 Coinage ==
- 1993 430 Years in Defence Christian Europe Gold Lm 25
- 1993 430 Years in Defence Christian Europe Silver Lm 5
- 1993 430 Years in Defence Christian Europe Cu Ni Lm 1
- 1993 25th Anniversary of CBM Silver Lm 5
- 1993 University of Malta Silver Lm 5
- 1993 World Cup 1994 Silver Lm 5

== 1994 Coinage ==
- 1994 Valletta Silver Lm 5

== 1995 Coinage ==
- 1995 UN 50th Anniversary Silver Lm 5

== 1996 Coinage ==
- 1996 Olympic Games Silver Lm 5

== 1997 Coinage ==
- 1997 UNICEF for the Children of the World Silver Lm 5

== 1998 Coinage ==
- 1998 30th Anniversary of CBM Silver Lm 5
- 1998 200th Anniversary Revolt Maltese vs French Silver Lm 5

== 1999 Coinage ==
- 1999 Mattia Preti Silver Lm 5

== 2000 Coinage ==
- 2000 Millennium Coin Silver Lm 5

== 2001 Coinage ==
- 2001 Enrico Mizzi Silver Lm 5

== 2002 Coinage ==
- 2002 Xprunara Gold Lm 10
- 2002 Nicolò Isouard Silver Lm 5

== 2003 Coinage ==
- 2003 Sir Adriano Dingli Silver Lm 5

== 2004 Coinage ==
Malta joined the European Union on 1 May 2004, to commemorate this, Malta issued a gold commemorative coin with a face value of Lm 25

- 2004 Malta's Accession to the European Union Gold Lm 25
- 2004 Giuseppe Calì Silver Lm 5

== 2006 Coinage ==
- 2006 Sir Temi Zammit Silver Lm 5

== 2007 Coinage ==
These were the last Maltese commemorative coins of the Maltese lira

- 2007 Jean De La Valette Silver Lm 5
- 2007 Jean De La Valette Gold Lm 25
