= Xrobb l-Għaġin Temple =

Megalithic temple ruins in Malta

Xrobb l-Għaġin Megalithic Site
- Is-sit Megalitiku ta' Xrobb l-Għaġin (Maltese)
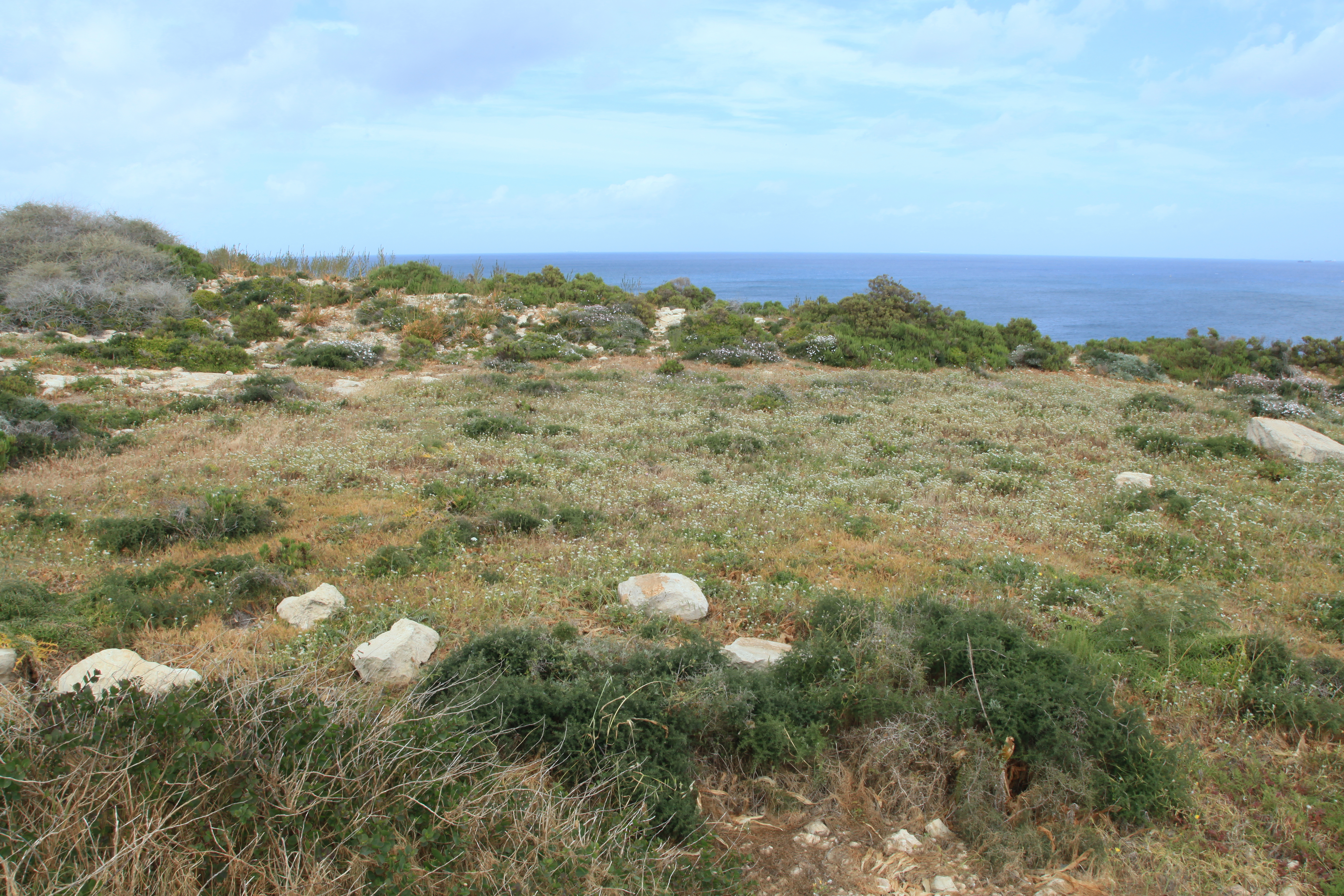
- The site in 2014

- Location in Malta
- 35°50′37.7″N 14°34′6.7″E
- Type: Temple
- Periods: Ġgantija phase
- Location: Marsaxlokk, Southern Region, Malta
- Part of: Megalithic Temples of Malta

History
- Built: c. 3300 BC

Site notes
- Material: Limestone
- Excavation dates: 1914-1915
- Archaeologists: Themistocles Zammit; A. V. Laferla; Thomas Ashby
- Discovered: 10 April 1913 by Carmelo Rizzo
- Condition: Poorly preserved ruins
- Management: Nature Trust Malta
- Public access: Yes (site dangerous due to coastal erosion)

Xrobb l-Għaġin Temple (Maltese: It-Tempju ta' Xrobb l-Għaġin) is a ruined megalithic temple in Xrobb l-Għaġin, limits of Marsaxlokk, Malta. After being identified in 1913, the site was excavated between 1914 and 1915. It was believed to have been largely destroyed by coastal erosion later on in the century, but investigations carried out in 2015 revealed that the remains of the temple still survive, along with a previously unrecorded megalithic structure nearby.

== Site ==
Xrobb l-Għaġin Megalithic Site had a typical temple plan with two apses and a central niche. It also had a paved court, with its entrance facing the southeast. The temple was built on ground with a steep gradient, and due to this an artificial terrace was built in front of the structure.

The earliest remains in the area date back to around 4000 BC, but the temple itself was built between 3600 and 3000 BC, during the Ġgantija phase of Maltese prehistory.

== Excavations and recent history ==
The megalithic site was discovered by Carmelo Rizzo, an architect in the Department of Public Works. Rizzo visited the site together with archaeologist Themistocles Zammit on 10 April 1913. The site was excavated by Zammit and A. V. Laferla between December 1914 and January 1915, revealing the core of a megalithic temple. A second excavation was carried out in May 1915 under the direction of Thomas Ashby, who subsequently produced a brief but detailed report about the site. A clay bowl, some slingstones and a decorated slab which formed part of a niche were retrieved during these excavations and they are now displayed at the National Museum of Archaeology in Valletta. The remains were included on the Antiquities List of 1925.

At the time of the 1915 excavations, parts of the temple had been destroyed by coastal erosion and the collapse of the remaining parts of the structure was already imminent. The exact location of the site was lost in subsequent decades, and the ruins were presumed to have been eroded away, being described as a "destroyed site" in 2002.

The exact site of the temple was identified once again by Ruben P. Borg and Reuben Grima after they carried out inspections in the area between 2012 and 2015. Some of the megaliths recorded by Ashby in 1915 were rediscovered, and on 7 February 2015, a number of previously unrecorded megaliths were discovered in a gully. These are probably the remains of another megalithic structure, possibly a monumental retaining wall which lined the gully. However, there is also the possibility that the retaining wall might be of a much later date, having been built using megaliths taken from the temple.

In 2017, it was announced that the environment and culture ministries were forming an inter-ministerial committee in order to safeguard the remains of the temple.

The remains of the temple are accessible to the public, and they fall within the limits of the Xrobb l-Għaġin Nature Park, which is managed by Nature Trust Malta. However, the area is considered extremely dangerous to visit since it is located at the edge of an undercut cliff face.
