= Debdieba =

Megalithic temple remains in Malta

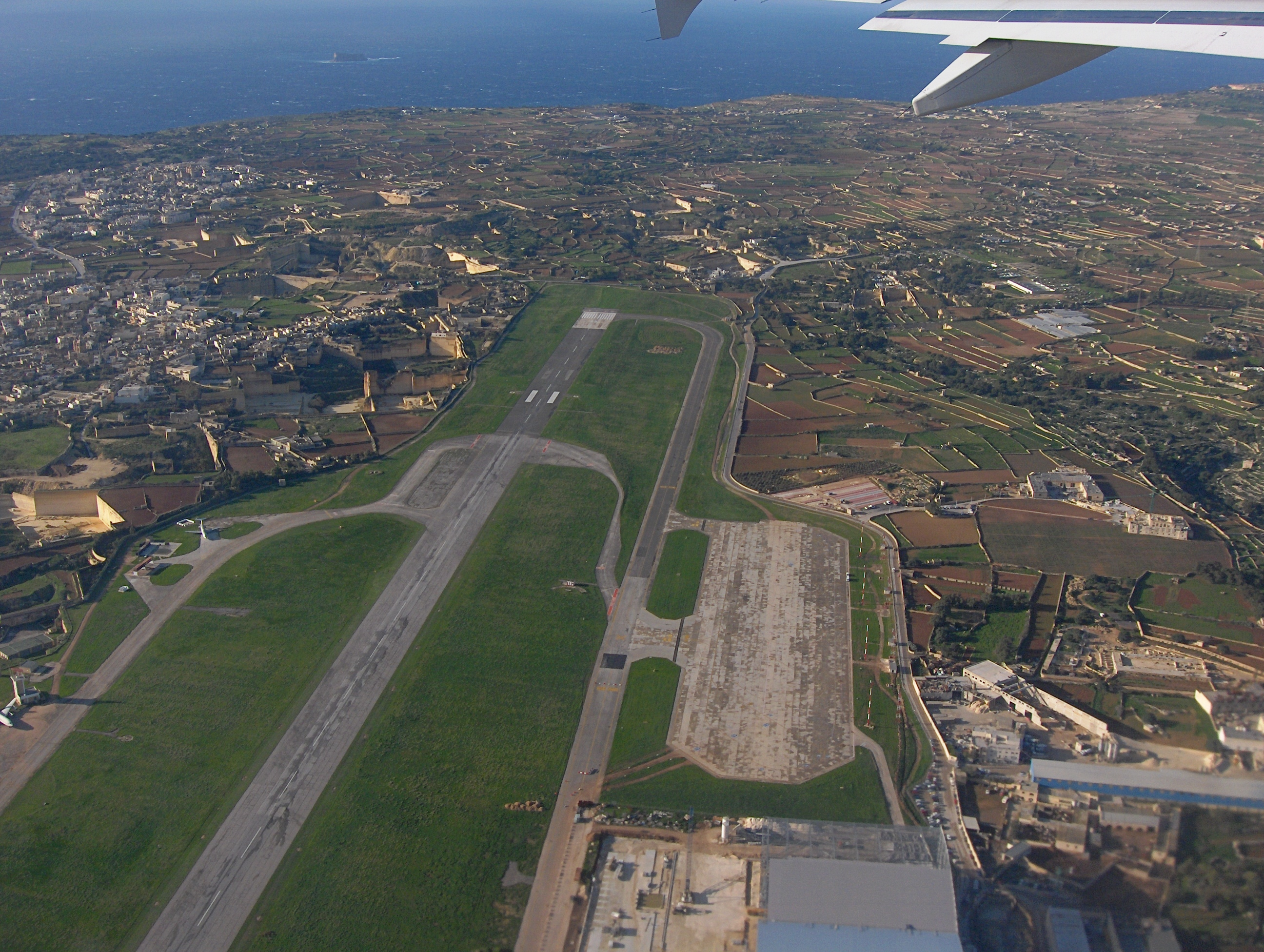
Malta International Airport Runway 23, the runway that the site was buried under.

Debdieba (Maltese: Id-Debdieba) is a megalithic temple in Luqa, Malta dating to around 3000–2500 BC. The site was first excavated by Thomas Ashby and Sir Temi Zammit in 1914. Although most of the remains were destroyed, the excavation found several fragments of pottery.

The majority of the site was buried in the 1960s due to the construction of an extension to the runway of Luqa airport. In 2007, concerns as to whether the site had been destroyed were raised by the Superintendence for Cultural Heritage in the wake of the controversial construction of a new hangar, predominantly underground, by Lufthansa Technik.

The place was also known as "the place of the echo" by Maltese natives as shouting near the site would produce an echo. This is most probably due to the two hills surrounding the site.
