= Tombs of Malta =

List of tombs in Malta

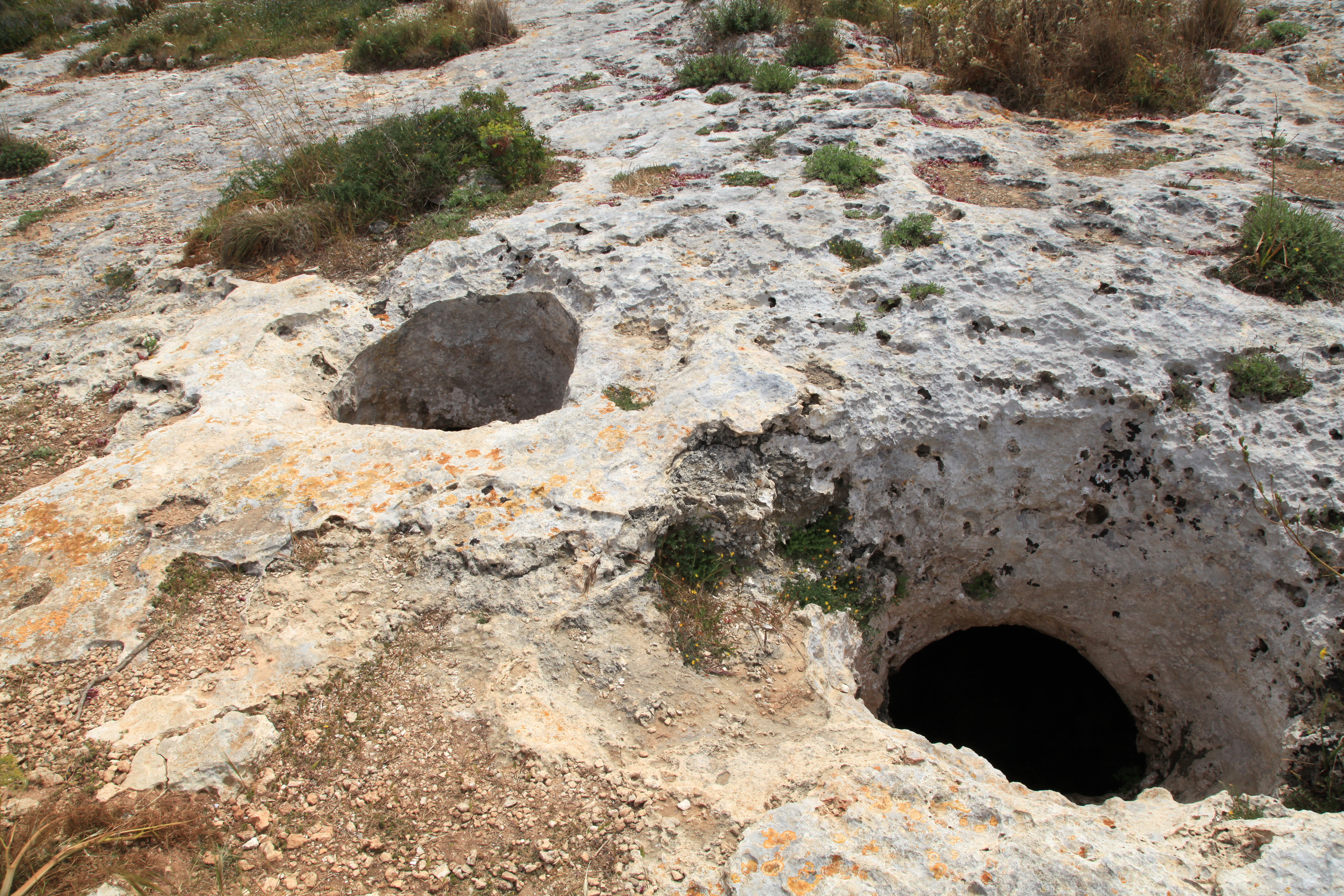
Xemxija Tombs

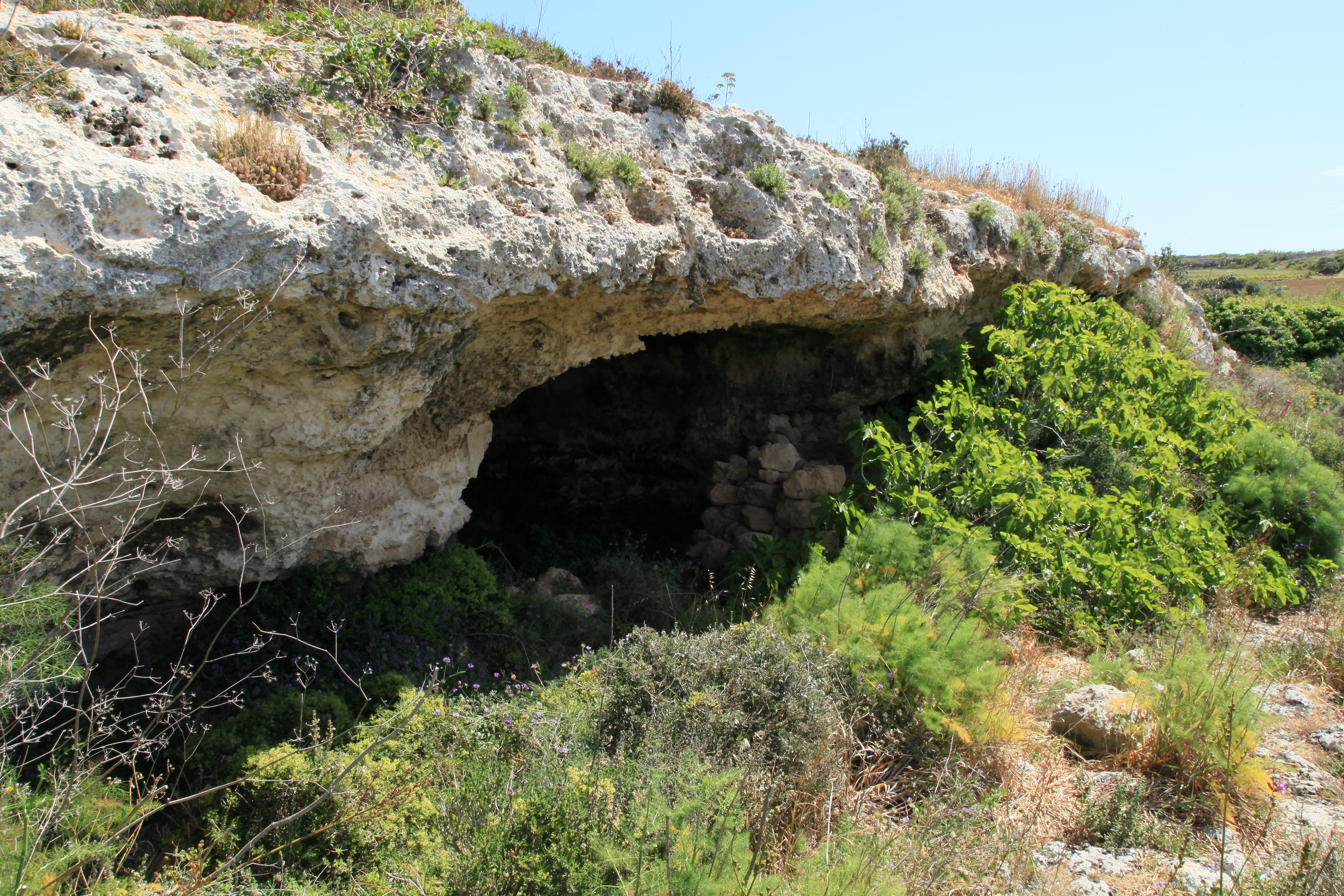
Bingemma Tombs

The Tombs of Malta are a series of prehistoric tombs in the Maltese archipelago.

== Tombs ==
- Bingemma Tombs
- Għar il-Midfna
- Kerċem Tombs
- Għar ta' Għejzu
- Ta' Ċenċ Gallery Grave
- Wied tax-Xlendi Tomb
- Xagħra Stone Circle
- Xemxija Tombs

== See also ==
- Megalithic Temples of Malta
- Ħal Saflieni Hypogeum
- Għar Dalam
