= Ġebel ġol-Baħar =

Alleged megalithic temple in Malta

- Location within Malta
- 35°55′57.2″N 14°29′44.3″E
- Location: off St. Julian's, Malta
- Part of: Megalithic Temples of Malta (allegedly)

Site notes
- Material: Limestone
- Height: 6–10 m (20–33 ft)

Ġebel ġol-Baħar is an alleged megalithic temple located underwater off the coast of St. Julian's, Malta. The site was identified in 1999 by retired real estate investor Hubert Zeitlmair, a follower of Zecharia Sitchin, but it was never studied properly and archaeologists are not convinced that the site is a temple.

== Site ==
The site is located on an underwater plateau approximately 2 km off the coast of St. Julian's. The plateau is 900 by 500 metres long, and its highest point seems to be man-made, and is 19 metres below sea level.

The site contains large boulders which Zeitlmair believes to be man-made and not natural, and which are covered in vegetation. Zeitlmair describes it as consisting of a cluster of three stone circles with 'rooms' with a diameter of 9 to 11 metres, with parts having a height up to 6 to 10 metres. An 'avenue' goes up to the entrance of the structure, which faces east. Tracks on the seabed resembling cart ruts were also observed on the site.

== Discovery ==
The site was discovered on 13 July 1999 by Shaun Arrigo and his brother Kurt, who were working under the instructions of Hubert Zeitlmair, a retired German real estate investor interested in pseudoarchaeology. The discovery was reported in the local media in October 1999, but after some time interest died down. Further explorations of the site were conducted by Zeitlmair in November 1999 and May 2000.

Zeitlmair believes that the temple was built by aliens in around 10,000 BC to 12,000 BC, and was submerged at the end of the Ice Age during the flood recounted in Genesis. He states that he has been guided by his "primeval ancestors, namely... the God Pa.tha-i-da.na Asu.ara tSi.dha, and the Goddess Ashtar-tara Queen of Atlantis" who he met on Malta. His views do not fit within Malta's prehistoric chronology, as the earliest known human habitation of the island began in around 5900 BC.

The site was given the name Ġebel ġol-Baħar, meaning "Stones in the Sea" in the Maltese language. It has also been linked with the island of Atlantis, and Zeitlmair has published a book about this in German.

== Analysis ==
Maltese archaeologists are not convinced that the site is a megalithic temple. Other people who have dived there say that the boulders which make up the site are not megalithic, but modern ones which were dumped illegally.

Mark Rose of the Archaeological Institute of America has written that "Chronology appears to be somewhat confused in Zeitlmair's interpretation. According to the web site, he sees links between the submerged "temple" and both Noah's Flood and the rise in sea level following the end of the Ice Age (the period to which, he told Maltamag, he hopes studies will show the Maltese temples date). Furthermore, the presence of deeper sand deposits on the west side of the "ruins," the side toward Gibraltar, than on the east side is taken as an indication that the flooding of the Mediterranean by Atlantic waters (which really did occur) was involved in the inundation of the "temple." The Mediterranean flooding, however, took place some five million years ago. As to the builders of the temples, Zeitlmair defers to Zechariah Sitchin."
