= Luigi Preziosi =

Maltese politician

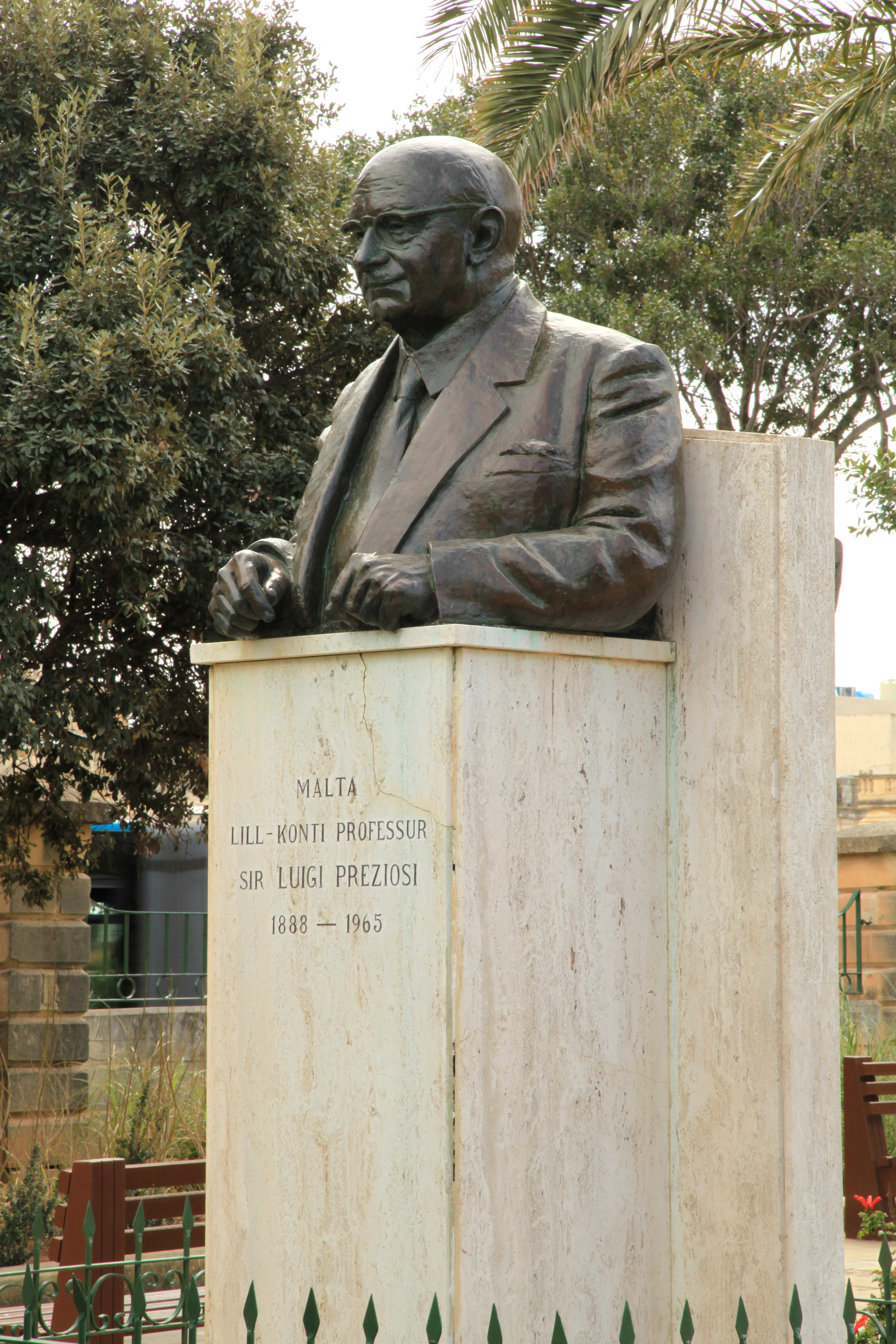
Bust of Count Sir Luigi Preziosi in The Mall, Floriana

Count Sir Luigi Preziosi (29 July 1888 – 30 July 1965) was a Maltese politician and a doctor who specialized in ophthalmology. He was mostly known for devising an original operation for the treatment of glaucoma in 1924, which remained in use for many decades.

== Biography ==
He was born in Sliema, Malta on 29 July 1888, the second son of the seventh Count Preziosi of Malta. He graduated in the Royal University of Malta in 1907.

During the First World War, Luigi Preziosi was a medical officer in the Royal Army Medical Corps.

He then married the Noble Lugarda Chapelle dei Baroni di San Giovanni on 29 April 1920, with whom he had three children.

The same year he specialised in ophthalmology in Oxford.

Following the death of his father, Luigi inherited the hereditary noble title of Count and became the 8th Count of Preziosi. He became a member and later president of the Committee of Privileges of the Maltese Nobility. He was knighted in the 1948 New Year Honours.

In 1924, he was appointed as Professor of Ophthalmology in the University of Malta. He was unusually interested in trachoma — a diseases prevalent in Malta at the time. In his early years, however, he obtained his greatest reputation internationally for his treatment of glaucoma which was first published in 1924. He referred to this operation initially as electro-cautery puncture and later simply as Preziosi’s operation. The procedure was considered an advance over the other available filtering operations such as trephination, sclerectomy and iridencleisis. The operation was discussed at various international ophthalmic congresses over the years. It was further developed by Harold G. Scheie in 1957. Preziosi’s operation for glaucoma remained in use for many years until the development of trabeculectomy.

During the Second World War, Preziosi served as an ophthalmic surgeon and consultant.

Preziosi was actively involved in politics. He was a member of the UPM and later in the interest of the Nationalist Party until 1949 when he retired.

Count Sir Luigi Preziosi died on 30 July 1965 in Malta. He is buried at the Santa Maria Addolorata Cemetery in Paola, the largest burial ground of Malta.
