= Tarxien Temples =

Archaeological complex in Malta

Ħal Tarxien Prehistoric Complex
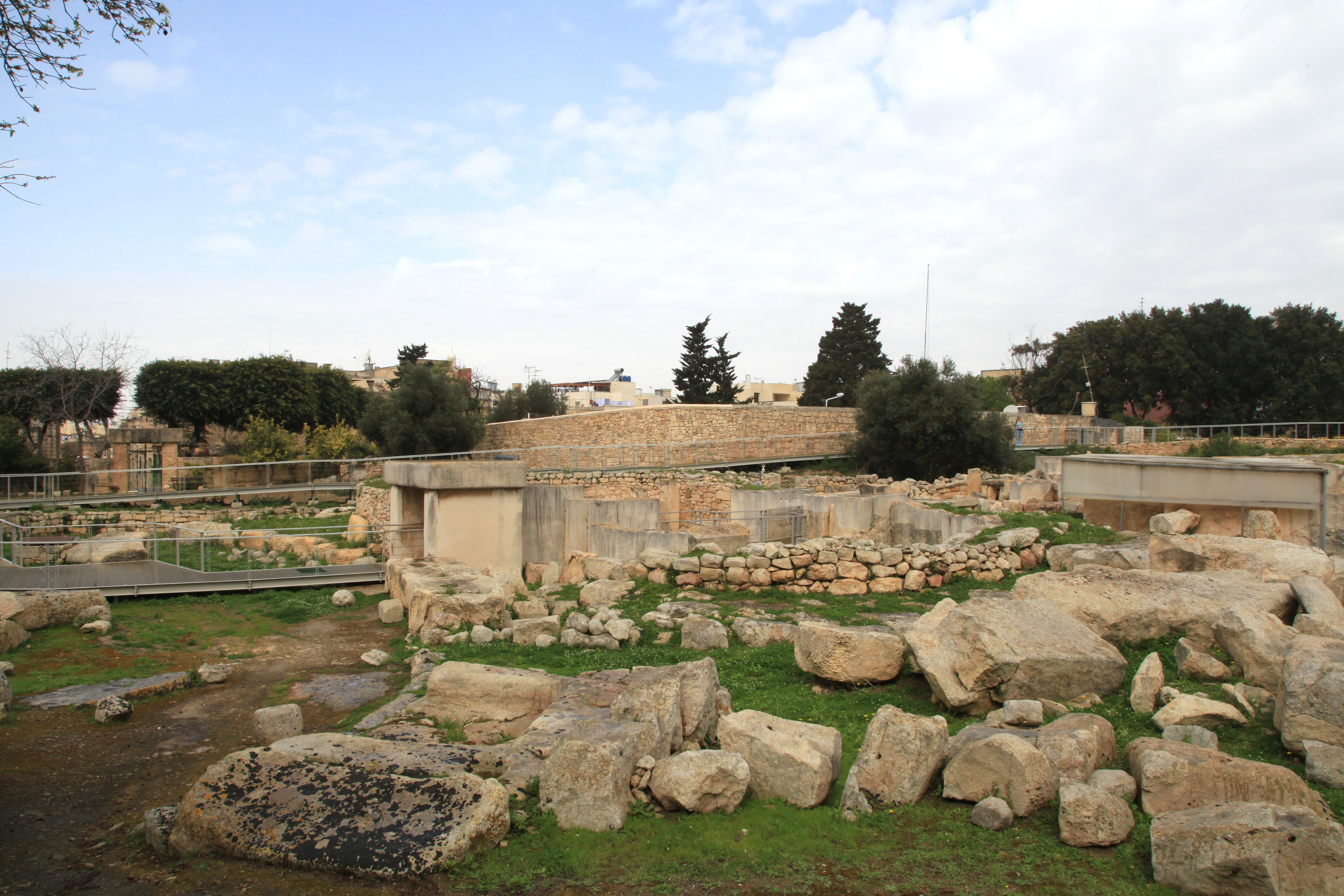
- Entrance to the Ħal Tarxien Prehistoric Complex

- location in Malta
- 35°52′9″N 14°30′43″E
- Type: Temple
- Periods: Tarxien phase
- Location: Tarxien, Malta

History
- Built: c.3250 BC–c.2800 BC

Site notes
- Material: Limestone
- Excavation dates: 1915, 1963
- Archaeologists: Themistocles Zammit
- Condition: Well-preserved ruins
- Owner: Government of Malta
- Management: Heritage Malta
- Public access: Yes
- Website: Heritage Malta

UNESCO World Heritage Site
- Part of: Megalithic Temples of Malta
- Criteria: Cultural: (iv)
- Reference: 132ter-006
- Inscription: 1980 (4th Session)
- Extensions: 1992, 2015
- Area: 0.807 ha (86,900 sq ft)
- Buffer zone: 11 ha (0.042 sq mi)

The Ħal Tarxien Prehistoric Complex (Maltese: Il-kumpless Preistoriku ta' Ħal Tarxien [ɪl kʊmˈplɛsː prɛɪ̯sˈtɔːrɪkʊ tɐ ˈħɐl tɐrˈʃɪːn]) is an archaeological complex in Tarxien, within the Port region of Malta. They date to approximately 3400 BC. The site was accepted as a UNESCO World Heritage Site in 1992 along with the other Megalithic temples on the island of Malta.

== Description ==
The Tarxien Complex consist of four different structures. At the same time, many of the decorated slabs discovered on site were relocated indoors for protection at the Museum of Archaeology in Valletta. The first structure is home to some of the most elaborate and impressive decorations of the Maltese Neolithic. Its main entrance is a reconstruction carried out in 1956. The central structure is unique in that, unlike other contemporary sites, it has six chambers in total. The Eastern Structure suffered severe alteration during the Roman period resulting in its strange shape. The remains of another structure, smaller, and older than the others is visible further towards the east.

Of particular interest at this site is the rich and intricate stonework, which includes depictions of domestic animals carved in relief, altars, and screens decorated with spiral designs and other patterns. Demonstrative of the skill of the builders is a chamber set into the thickness of the wall between the South and Central temples and containing a relief showing a bull and a sow.

== Discovery and history ==
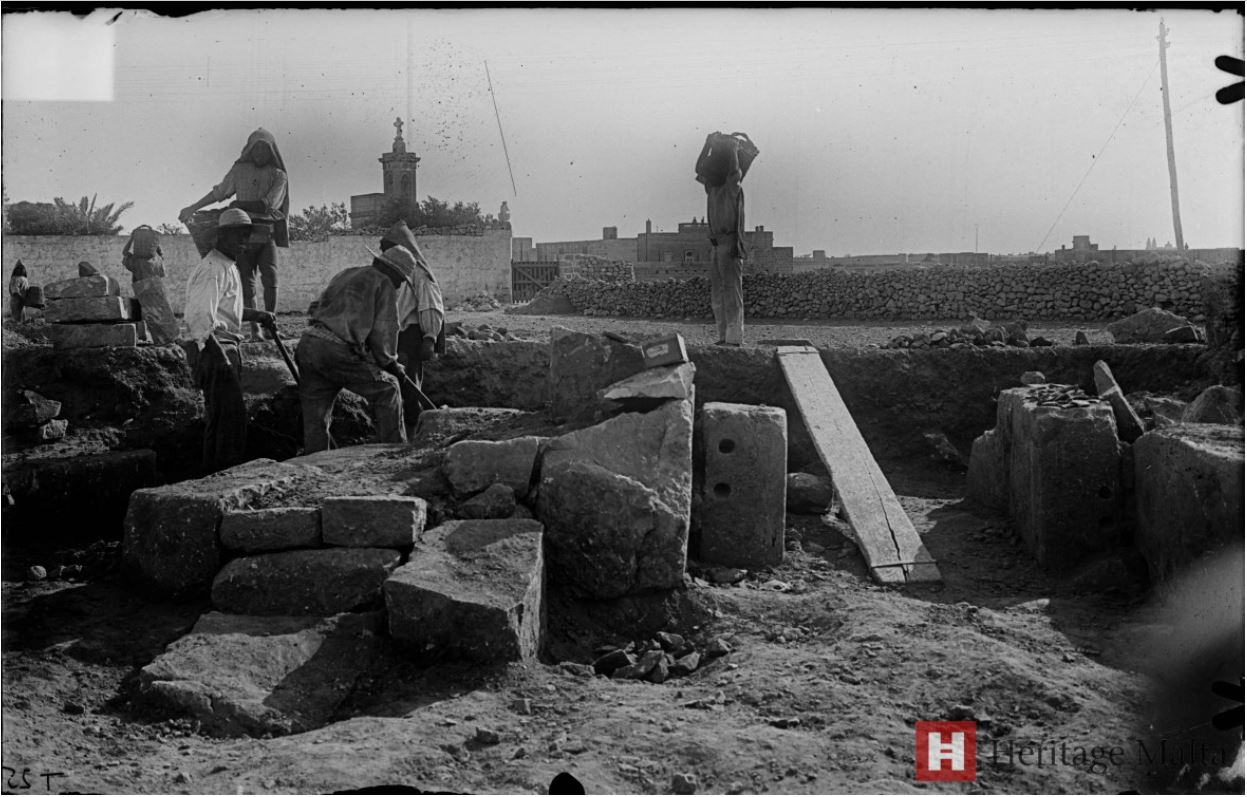
Excavation of the Ħal Tarxien Prehistoric Complex. Photo by Themistocles Zammit, 1915

The site was initially reported by the tenant of the land, Lorenzo Despott, who complained of frequently encountering large blocks of stone just beneath the surface while plowing his field. Suspecting that the stones he was encountering may have some archaeological value, Despott contacted the director of the National Museum, Themistocles Zammit, who instructed him to dig a trial trench in 1913. Upon excavation, several large stone were revealed and the pottery found was undoubtedly prehistoric. Thus, Temi Zammit began a formal excavation of the site in 1915, a campaign which would last till 1919. Over the course of four years, Zammit enlisted the help of local farmers and townspeople for an excavation project of unprecedented scale in Malta. By 1920, Zammit had identified and carried out restoration work on four prehistoric structures, all yielding a remarkable collection of artifacts, including the famous colossal statue, the largest human (although seemingly genderless) representation from the Neolithic found to date.

A small sample of artefacts from the site were donated by Zammit in 1923 to the British Museum. The site was included in the Antiquities List of 1925. Further excavations at the site were conducted during post-World War II period under the directorship of J.G. Baldacchino.

Protective tent-like shelters, similar to those at Ħaġar Qim and Mnajdra, were built around the Tarxien Temples in 2015, and were completed in December of that year.

== Significance ==
The discovery of the complex did much to further Malta's national identity, solidly confirming the existence of a thriving ancient culture on the island. Also, the general interest aroused by the finds engendered for the first time a public concern for the protection of Malta's historical treasures, including a need for management of the sites, the promulgation of laws, and other measures to protect and preserve monuments. At the same time, Themistocles' thorough scientific approach to excavation introduced Malta to a proper archaeological investigation rather than the rough and swift antiquarian method of digging.

== Gallery ==
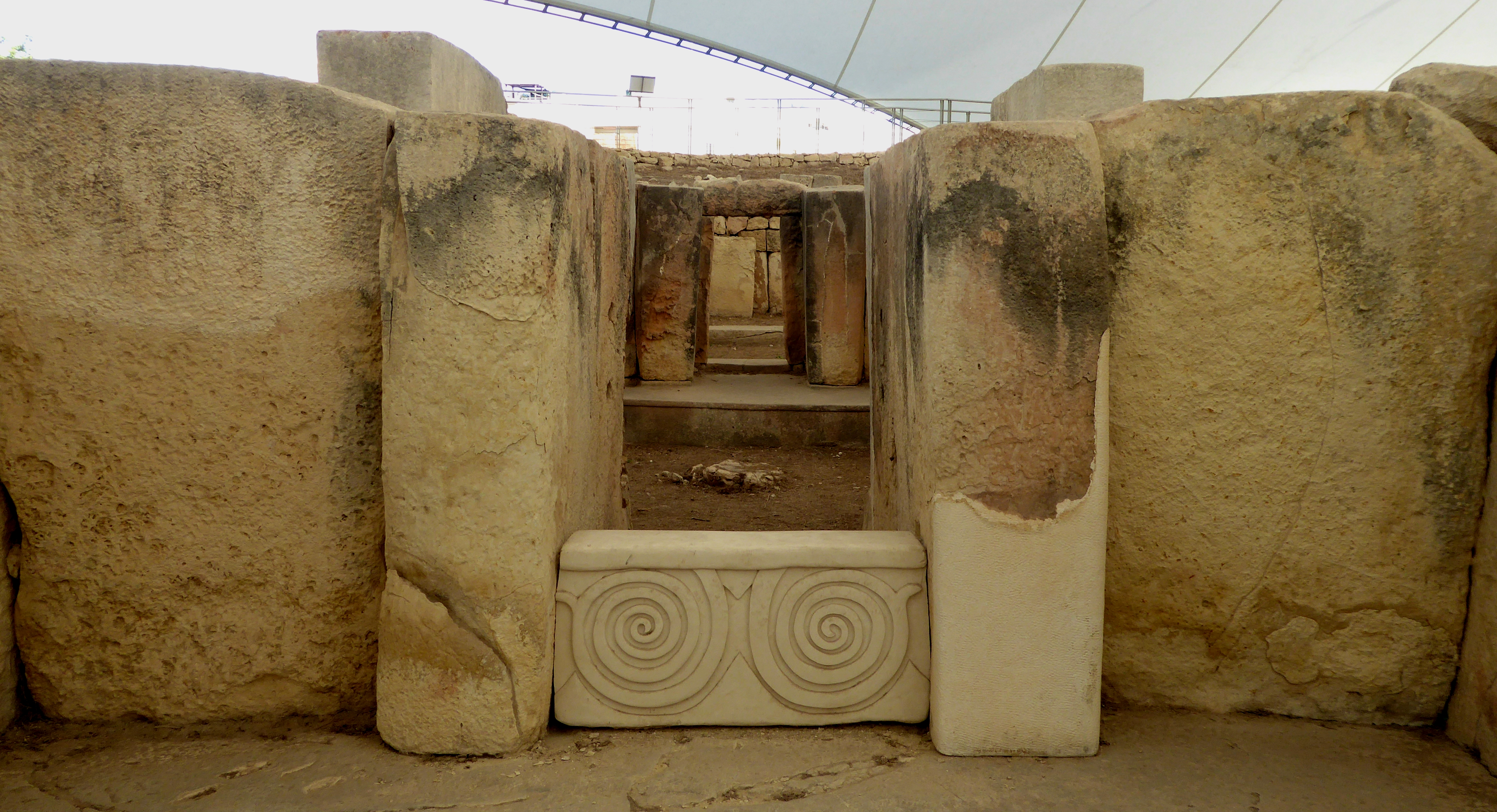
The entrance to the two top apses of the Ħal Tarxien Prehistoric Complex

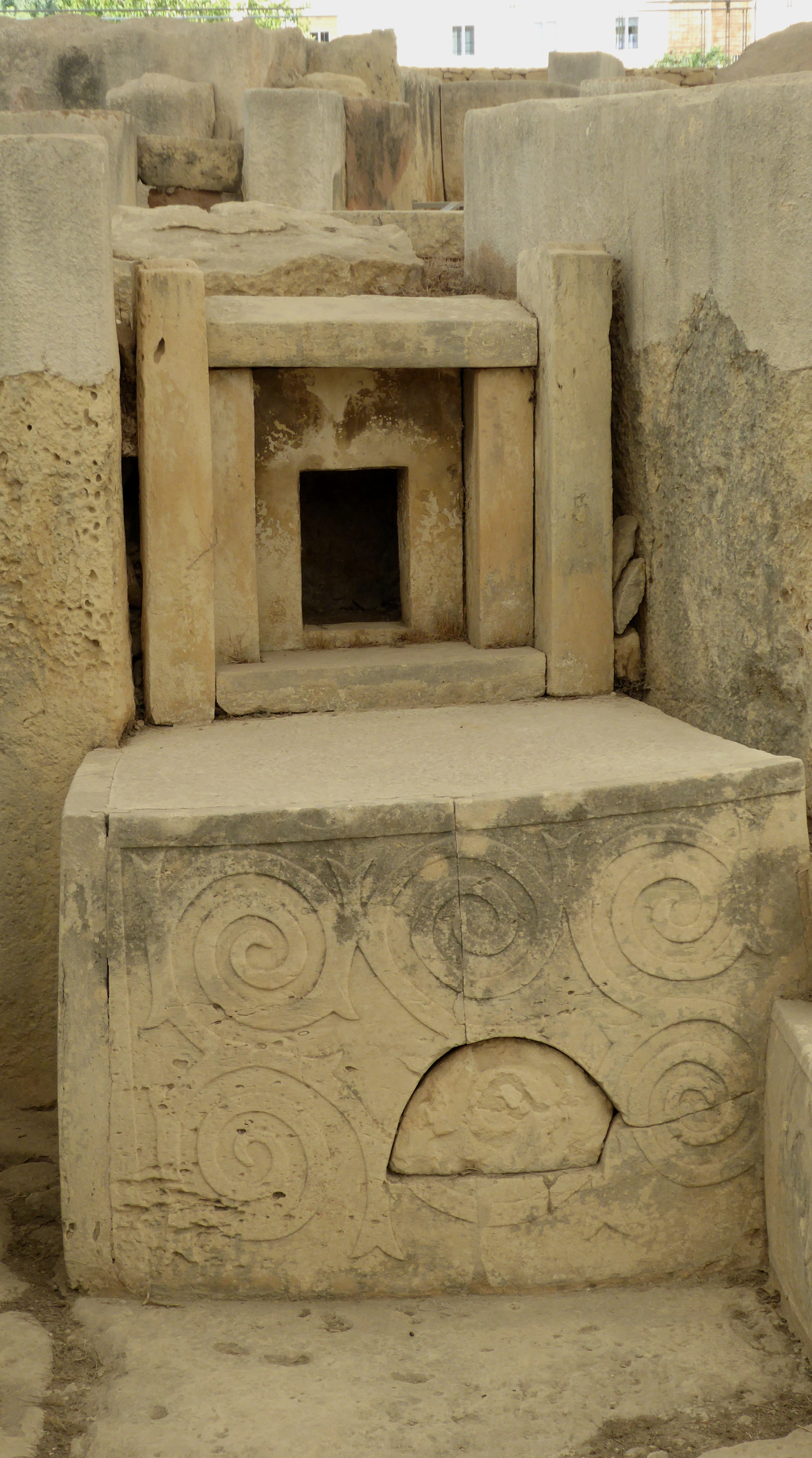
Feature withinin the southwestern structure

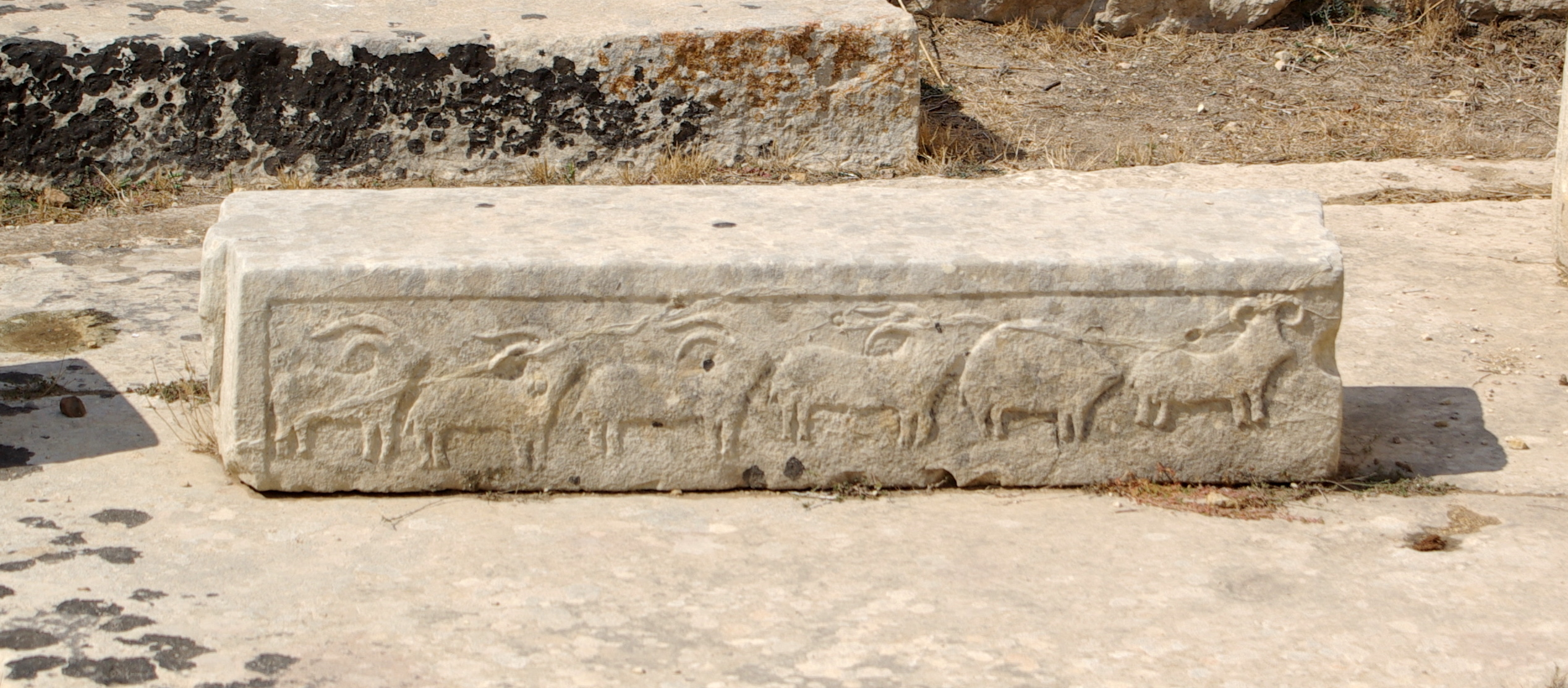
A relief showing goats and rams in one of the structures at Tarxien

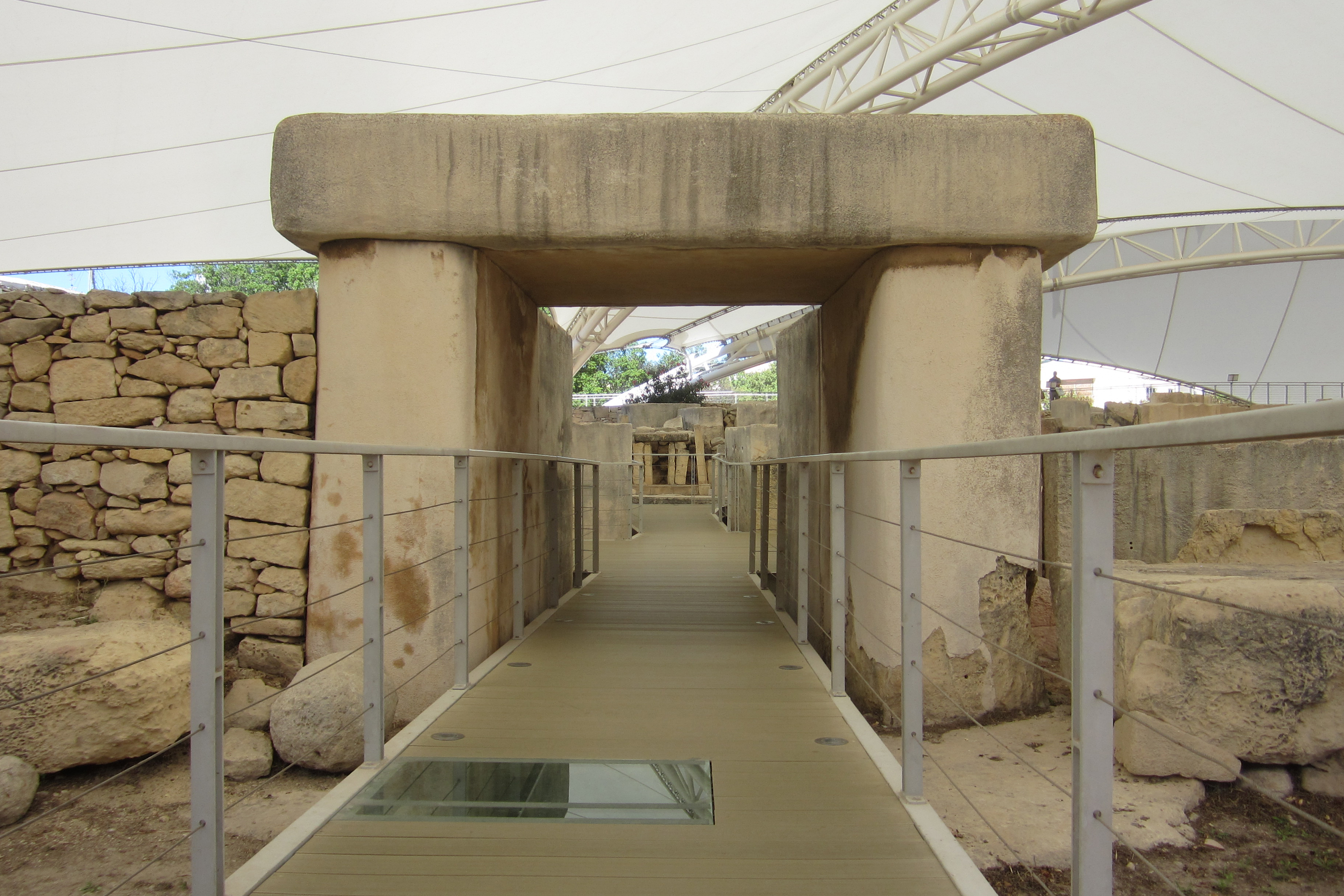
View into the Southern Structure through the trilithon doorway reconstructed in the 1950s

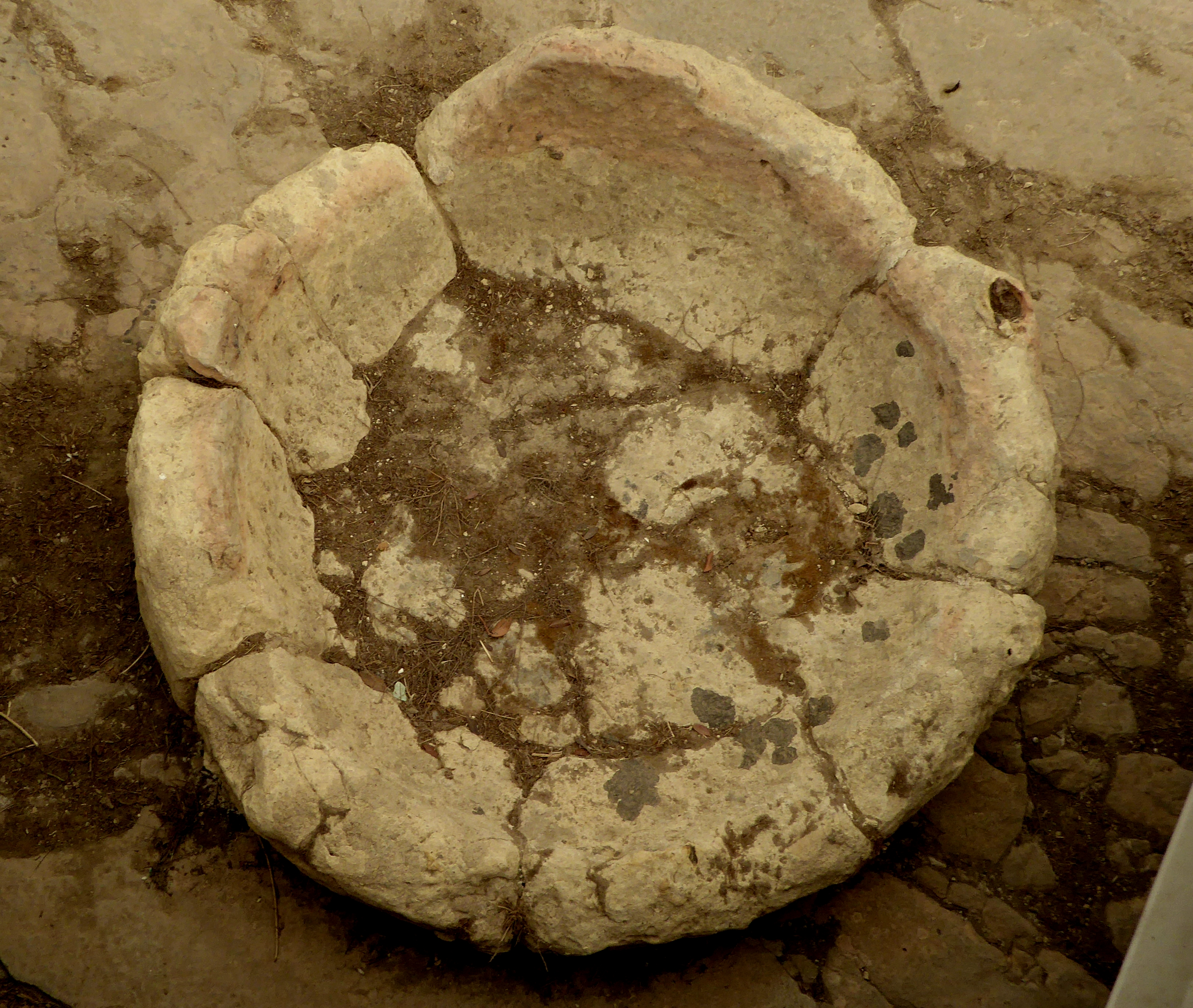
A bowl in the Central Structure at Tarxien

== See also ==
- List of megalithic sites
