= Themistocles Zammit =

Maltese archaeologist and doctor (1864–1935)

Sir Themistocles Zammit CMG
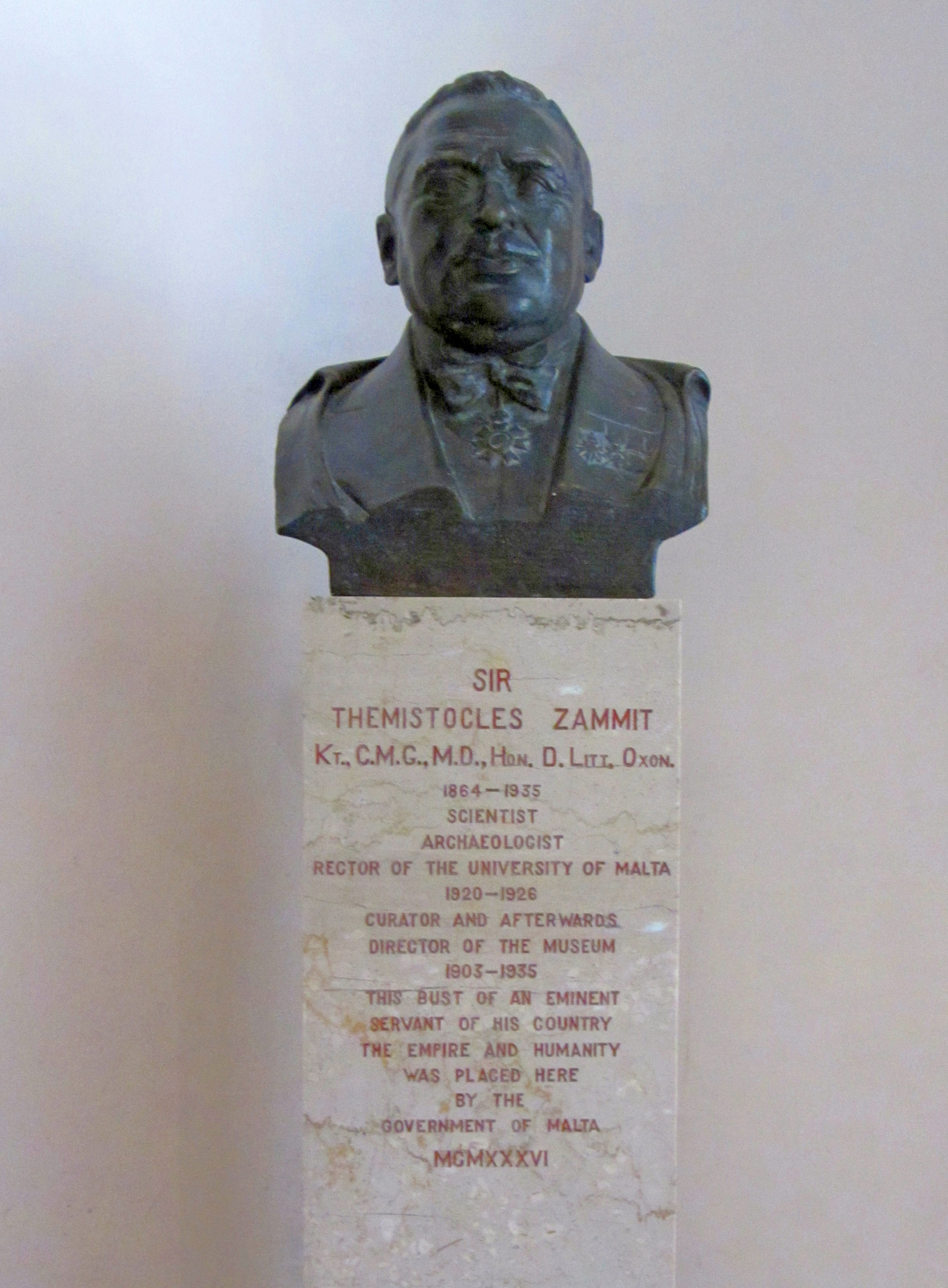
- Bust of Zammit at the National Museum of Archaeology, Valletta
- Born: 30 September 1864; Valletta, Malta
- Died: 2 November 1935 (aged 71)
- Occupations: Archaeologist, historian, medical doctor, academic, writer
- Spouse: Aloisia Barbaro di San Giorgio
- Children: 2

Sir Themistocles "Temi" Zammit CMG (30 September 1864 – 2 November 1935) was a Maltese archaeologist and historian, professor of chemistry, medical doctor, researcher and writer. He served as Rector (1920–26) of the Royal University of Malta and first Director of the National Museum of Archaeology in his native city, Valletta.

== Career ==
After graduating in medicine from the University of Malta, Zammit specialised in bacteriology in London and Paris. It is understood that in 1905 the discovery of contaminated milk as the vector for transmission to humans of Brucellosis melitensis present in the blood of the goat greatly contributed to the elimination from the islands of undulant fever, earning him the knighthood.

Author of several literary works in the Maltese language, Zammit was conferred the DLitt Honoris Causa by Oxford University. He was knighted in 1930, having previously been admitted as a Companion to the Order of St Michael and St George. He also published a history of the Maltese islands and excavated important archaeological sites, such as the Hypogeum and the megalithic Tarxien Temples, Ħaġar Qim and Mnajdra, which have since been declared UNESCO World Heritage Sites.

== Legacy ==
Zammit's scientific approach to archaeology further enhanced his international reputation. A permanent display of some of his findings may be viewed at the National Museum of Archaeology in Valletta.

The main hall of the University of Malta bears Zammit's name. The Sir Temi Zammit Hall is a multipurpose auditorium which is used as a lecture hall, theatre, and student graduations venue.

Zammit is depicted on two commemorative Maltese coins: a Maltese 1 Pound (Lm1) coin dated 1973 and a Maltese 5 Pounds (Lm5) coin dated 2006. Both coins are silver and depict his likeness alongside his dates of birth and death.

Zammit signed most of his works with his initials T. Z.
