= Maltese euro coins =

Designs of Maltese currency

Maltese euro coins feature three separate designs for the three series of coins. Malta has been a member of the European Union since 1 May 2004, and is a member of the Economic and Monetary Union of the European Union. Malta adopted the euro as its official currency on 1 January 2008, replacing the Maltese lira. For a period of one month until 31 January, there was a dual circulation for Malta where the euro and Maltese lira were used alongside each other.

== Maltese euro design ==
For images of the common side and a detailed description of the coins, see euro coins.

Depiction of Maltese euro coinage | Obverse side
€0.01	€0.02	€0.05
Mnajdra temple altar
€0.10	€0.20	€0.50
Coat of arms of Malta
€1.00	€2.00	€2 Coin Edge
		"2" with a Maltese Cross, repeated 6 times alternately upright and inverted.
The Maltese cross		"2" with a Maltese Cross, repeated 6 times alternately upright and inverted.

== Design selection process ==
The selection of the designs of the coins was decided by public consultation in two rounds. The first round of the consultation process started on 14 January 2006 and ended on 29 January 2006. During this period the Maltese public could participate in the process by choosing from a total of twelve options, divided into four design themes – Prehistoric Malta, Renaissance Malta, The Maltese Identity and The Maltese Archipelago. Three different options were presented for each theme.

The results of the first round voting were The Baptism of Christ in St John’s Co-Cathedral (3498 votes), Malta’s coat of arms (2742 votes) and Mnajdra Temple Altar (1872 votes). Another design, The Fort St. Angelo option, received 2037 votes, but was not included as one of the three chosen options, since the Baptism of Christ received the most votes in that theme.

Along with the visual design options, the public was also given several alternative options, which were voted on in the same manner. The first and second most popular suggestions made by the public were the Maltese cross and Dun Karm, respectively on the Maltese euro coin set. The Steering Committee for the adoption of the euro ultimately decided to include the most popular suggestion, the Maltese Cross, with the three chosen by the public.

These four finalists were then sent to a designer (Noel Galea Bason) and four designs were rendered for the second round of voting.

1st place:
Maltese cross

2nd place:
Maltese coat of arms

3rd place:
Mnajdra temple

4th place:
Baptism of Christ

During the second phase, running from 29 May until 9 June 2006, the public was asked to choose the actual designs for the euro coins from the four mock ups produced by the designer. The three designs with the highest number of votes would then become the final design for the Maltese face of the euro coin set.

The results of the second round were Maltese cross, followed by the coat of arms of Malta and the Mnajdra Temples.

The Central Bank of Malta released the final designs of the euro coins on 19 February 2007.

On 23 October 2007, the designs were officially published in the Official Journal of the European Union.

== Circulating mintage quantities ==
Face Value	€0.01	€0.02	€0.05	€0.10	€0.20	€0.50	€1.00	€2.00
2008	10,000,000	36,000,000	34,000,000	41,000,000	40,000,000	15,000,000	14,000,000	10,000,000
2009	—N/a	—N/a	—N/a	—N/a	—N/a	—N/a	—N/a	—N/a
2010	—N/a	—N/a	—N/a	—N/a	—N/a	—N/a	—N/a	2,000,000
2011	s	s	s	s	s	s	s	s
2012	s	s	s	s	s	s	s	s
2013	11,000,000	7,500,000	10,000,000	s	s	3,000,000	s	3,660,250
2014	s	s	s	s	s	s	s	s
2015	s	3,100,000	12,000,000	s	s	s	s	7,200,000
2016	250,000	250,000	250,000	200,000	200,000	200,000	125,000	125,000
2017	6,000,000	s	4,500,000	2,500,000	s	2,500,000	2,000,000	s
2018	21,000,000	10,000,000	s	s	s	s	s	s
2019	5,000,000	s	10,500,000	7,000,000	3,500,000	2,500,000	2,500,000	s
2020	s	4,000,000	2,000,000	2,500,000	1,500,000	1,000,000	1,500,000	s
2021	6,500,000	7,000,000	4,600,000	3,100,000	2,500,000	1,200,000	1,100,000	s
2022	4,000,000	4,900,000	3,600,000	1,100,000	1,000,000	s	s	s
2023	s	s	3,300,000	2,300,000	1,800,000	500,000	1,000,000	s
— No coins were minted that year for that denomination s Small quantities minted for sets only

=== Mints ===
2008, 2016-2021: France
2010-2015: Netherlands

== Identifying marks ==
National Identifier	"MALTA"
Mint Mark	F (2008, 2016-2021), (Note: 2009 2 euro commemorative coin.)
Engravers Initials	NGB (1, 2 and 5 cent)
€2 Edge inscription	

== €2 commemorative coins ==
Year	Subject	Volume

=== Maltese constitutional history ===
Year	Number	Design	Volume
2011	1	First Election of Representatives in 1849	
2012	2	Majority Representation in 1887	
2013	3	Establishment of Self-Government in 1921	
2014	4	Independence from Britain in 1964	
2015	5	Proclamation of the Republic of Malta in 1974	

=== Maltese Prehistoric Sites ===
Year	Number	Design	Volume
2016	1	Ġgantija	
2017	2	Ħaġar Qim	
2018	3	Mnajdra	
2019	4	Ta' Ħaġrat Temples	
2020	5	Skorba Temples	
2021	6	Tarxien Temples	
2022	7	Hypogeum of Ħal-Saflieni	

=== From Children in Solidarity ===
Featuring the Role of the Malta Community Chest Fund in Society.

Year	Number	Design	Volume
2016	1	Solidarity through love	
2017	2	Solidarity and peace	
2018	3	Cultural heritage	
2019	4	Nature and Environment	
2020	5	Children's games	

=== Maltese Walled Cities ===
Year	Number	Design	Volume
2024	1	The Cittadella	
2025	2	Mdina	

=== Maltese Native Species ===
Year	Number	Design	Volume
2024	1	Maltese honey bee	
2025	2	Maltese ox	

== Other commemorative coins (collectors' coins) ==
Malta joined the Eurozone in 2008 and they have minted several collectors' coins in silver and gold. Their face value range from 10 to 50 euro. This is mainly done as a legacy of old national practice of minting gold and silver coins. These coins are not intended to be used as means of payment, so they do not circulate.

== See also ==
- Malta in the European Union
