= Mnajdra =

Megalithic temple complex in Malta

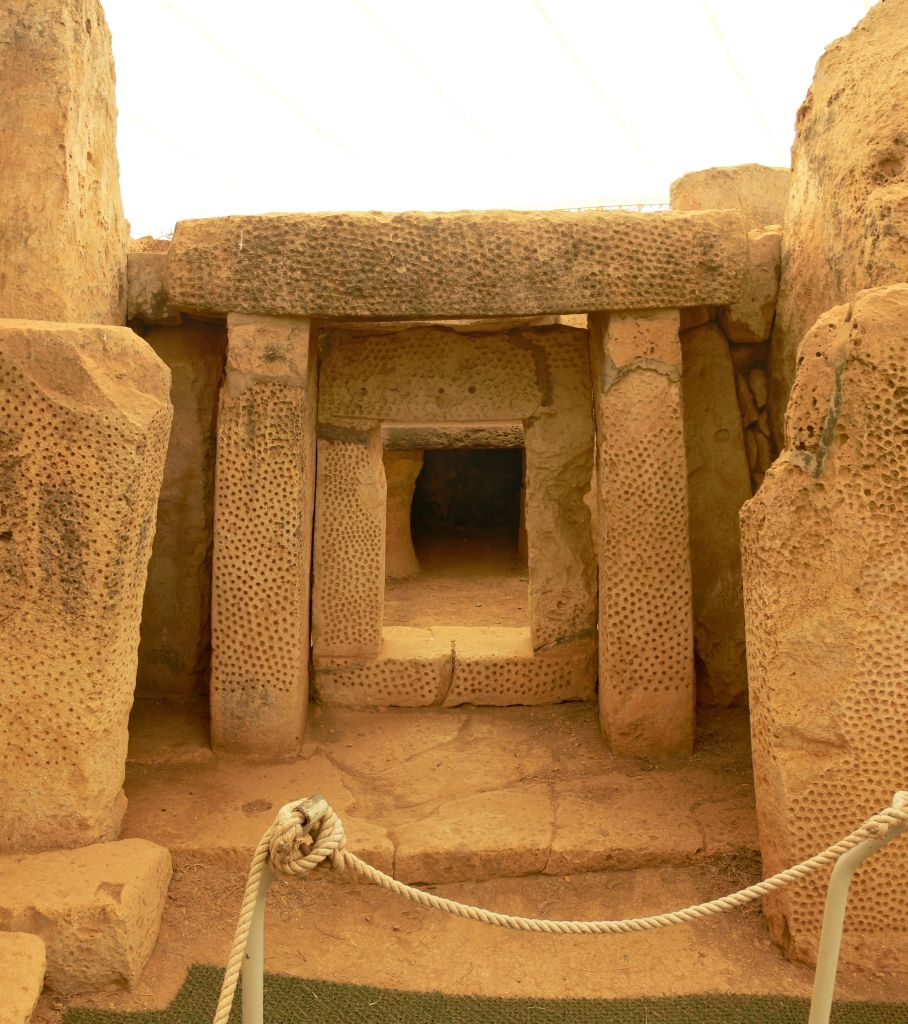
- Niche at the Mnajdra South Temple

- Location in Malta
- 35°49′36″N 14°26′11″E
- Type: Temple
- Periods: Ġgantija phase Tarxien phase
- Location: Qrendi, Southern Region, Malta

History
- Built: c. 3400 BC

Site notes
- Material: Limestone
- Excavation dates: 1840–1954
- Archaeologists: J. G. Vance; Themistocles Zammit; John Davies Evans
- Condition: Well-preserved ruins
- Owner: Government of Malta
- Management: Heritage Malta
- Public access: Yes
- Website: Heritage Malta

UNESCO World Heritage Site
- Part of: Megalithic Temples of Malta
- Criteria: Cultural: (iv)
- Reference: 132ter-003
- Inscription: 1980 (4th Session)
- Extensions: 1992, 2015
- Area: 0.563 ha (60,600 sq ft)

Mnajdra (Maltese: L-Imnajdra) is a megalithic temple complex found on the southern coast of the Mediterranean island of Malta. Mnajdra is approximately 497 metres (544 yd) from the Ħaġar Qim megalithic complex. Mnajdra was built around the fourth millennium BCE; the Megalithic Temples of Malta are among the most ancient religious sites on Earth, described by the World Heritage Sites committee as "unique architectural masterpieces." In 1992, UNESCO recognized the Mnajdra complex and four other Maltese megalithic structures as UNESCO World Heritage Sites. In 2009, work was completed on a protective tent.

== Design ==
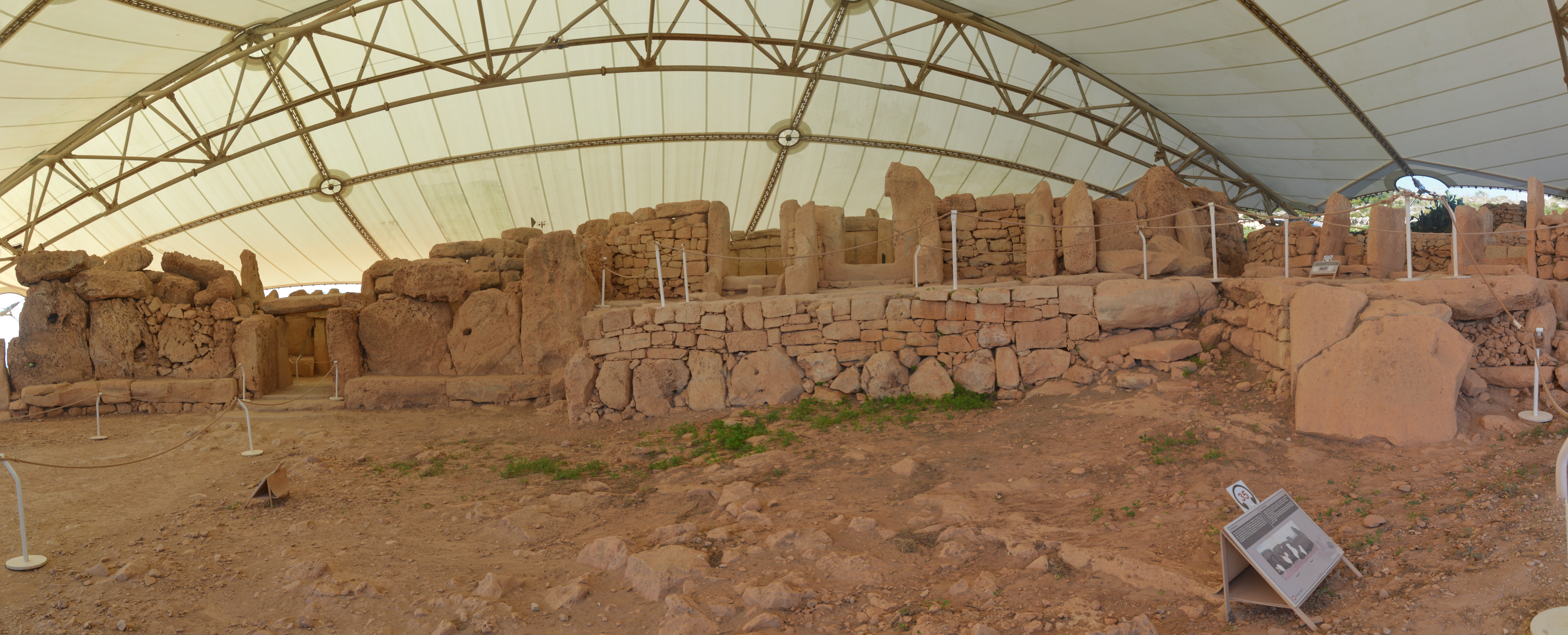
Upper temple panoramic

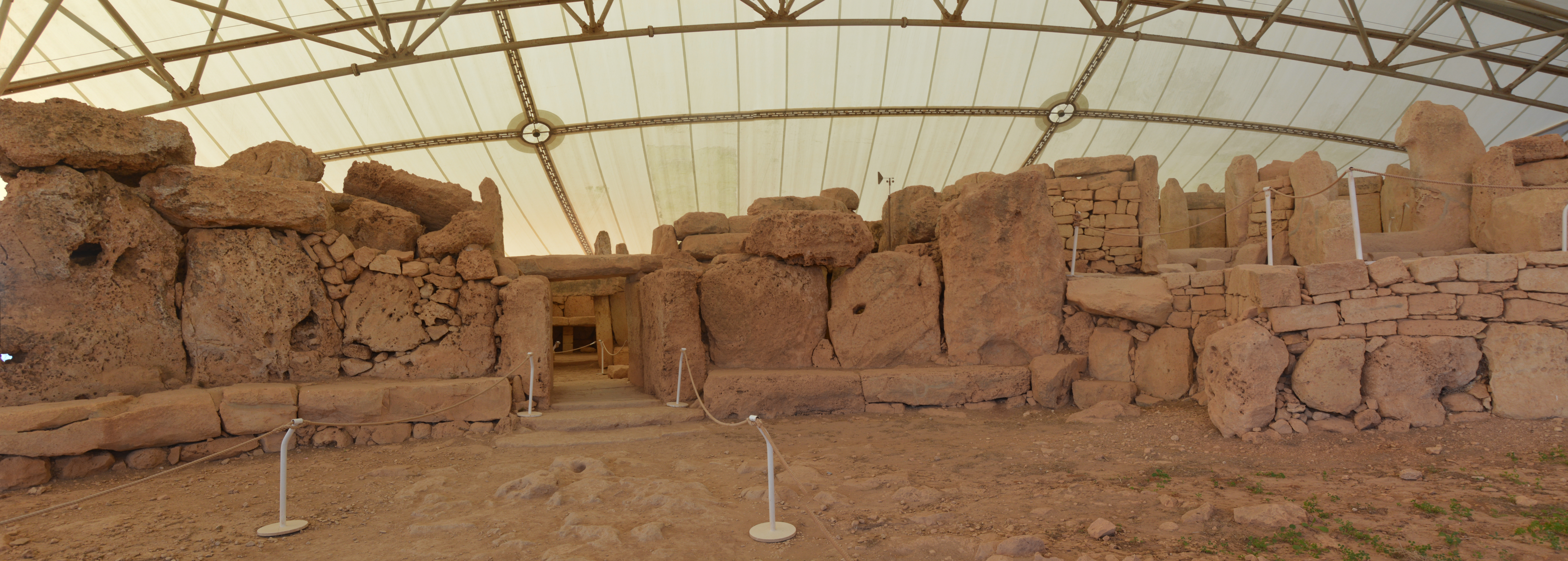
Low temple panoramic

Mnajdra is made of coralline limestone, which is much harder than the soft globigerina limestone of Ħaġar Qim. The main structural systems used in the temples are corbelling with smaller stones, and post and lintel construction using large slabs of limestone.

The cloverleaf plan of Mnajdra appears more regular than that of Ħagar Qim, and seems reminiscent of the earlier complex at Ġgantija. The prehistoric structure consists of three temples, conjoined, but not connected: the upper, middle, and lower.

The upper temple is the oldest structure in the Mnajdra complex and dates to the Ġgantija phase (3600-3200 BC). It is a three-apse building, the central apse opening blocked by a low screen wall. The pillar-stones were decorated with pitmarks drilled in horizontal rows on the inner surface.

The middle temple was built (or possibly rebuilt) in the late Tarxien phase (3150 – 2500 BC), the main central doorway of which is formed by a hole cut into a large piece of limestone set upright, a type of construction typical of other megalithic doorways in Malta. This temple appears originally to have had a vaulted ceiling, but only the base of the ceiling now remain on top of the walls and, in fact, is the most recent structure. It is formed of slabs topped by horizontal courses.

The lowest temple, built in the early Tarxien phase, is the most impressive and possibly the best example of Maltese megalithic architecture. It has a large forecourt containing stone benches, an entrance passage covered by horizontal slabs, one of which has survived, and the remains of a possibly domed roof. The temple is decorated with spiral carvings and indentations, and pierced by windows, some into smaller rooms and one onto an arrangement of stones.

== Functions ==
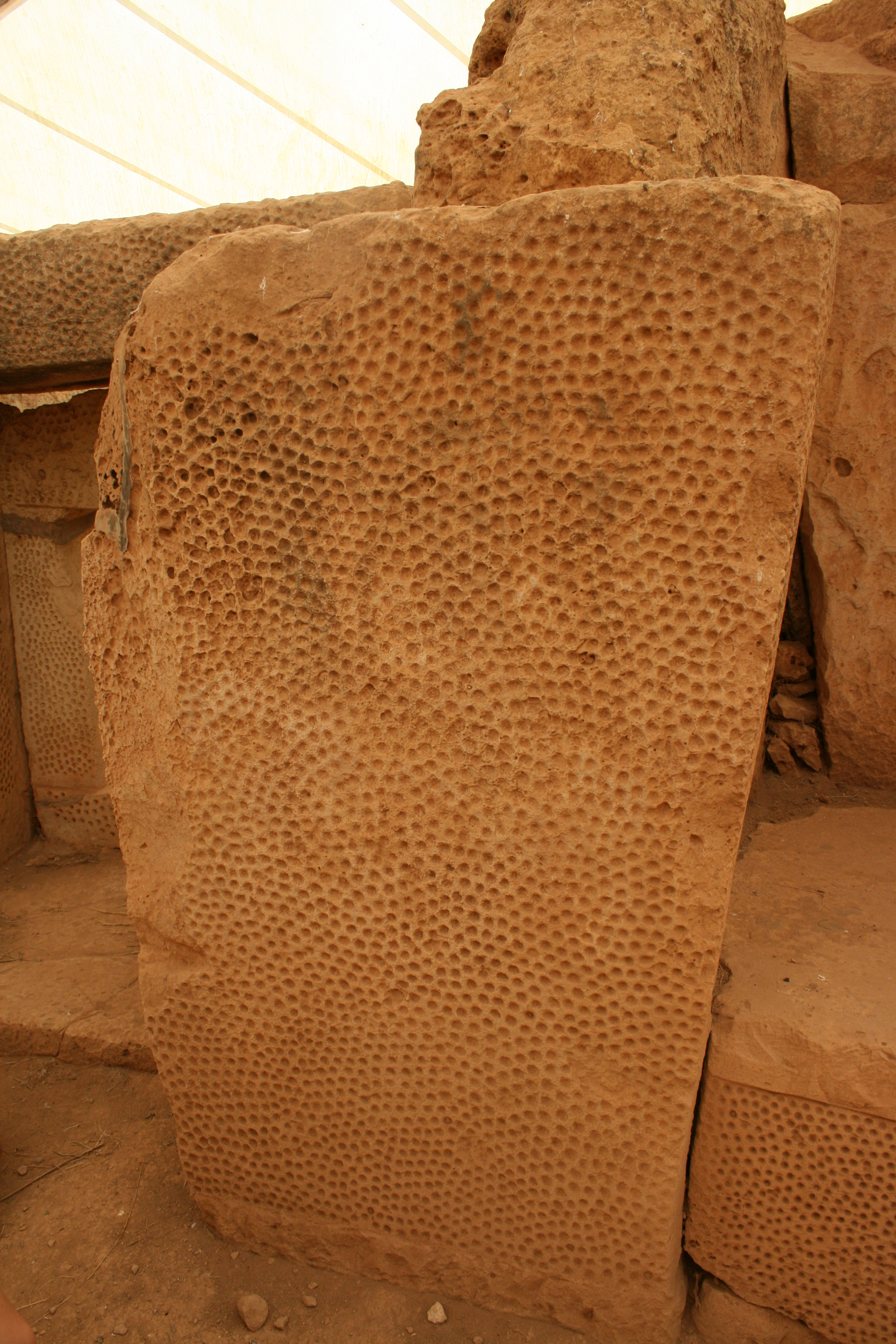
Dressed limestone

The lowest temple is astronomically aligned and thus was probably used as an astronomical observation and/or calendrical site. On the vernal and the autumnal equinox sunlight passes through the main doorway and lights up the major axis. On the solstices sunlight illuminates the edges of megaliths to the left and right of this doorway.

Although there are no written records to indicate the purpose of these structures, archaeologists have inferred their use from ceremonial objects found within them: sacrificial flint knives and rope holes that were possibly used to constrain animals for sacrifice (since various animal bones were found). These structures were not used as tombs since no human remains were found. The temples contain furniture such as stone benches and tables that give clues to their use. Many artifacts were recovered from within the temples suggesting that these temples were used for religious purposes, perhaps to heal illness and/or to promote fertility.

== Calendar stone ==
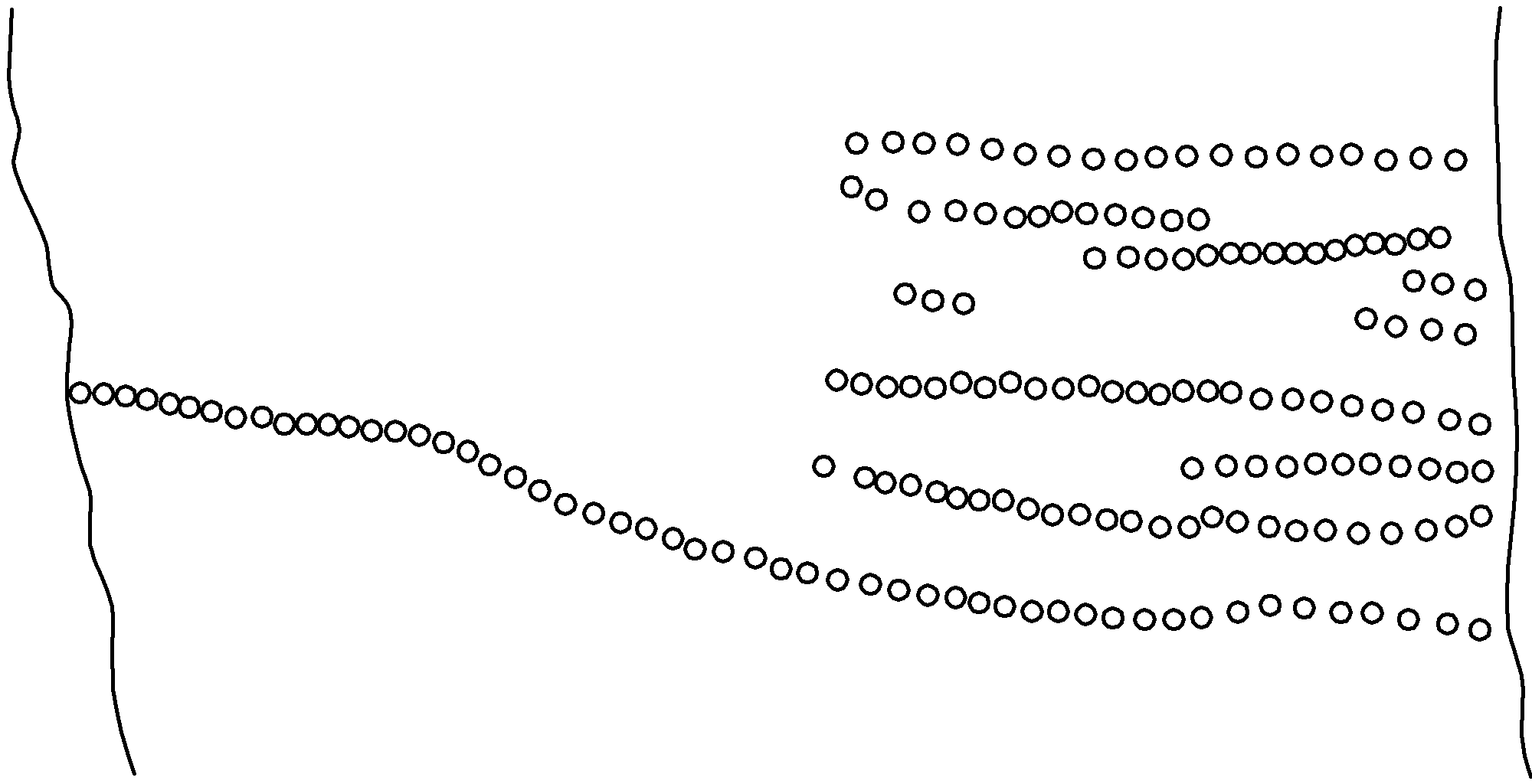
Sketch of the rows of holes on the calendar stone of Mnajdra

One of the stones displays a lot of drilled holes arranged in different right-aligned rows that can be linked to several periods determined by the moon.

Rows with holes on the calendar stone of the temple of Mnajdra in Malta
Row	Number of holes	Possible use
1	19	For the 19 years of the Metonic cycle (235 synodic, 255 draconic, 254 sidereal month respectively 6940 days). After this period the moon has the same lunar phase and the same ecliptic latitude and the same ecliptic longitude (e.g., in the Golden Gate of the Ecliptic or in the equinox).
2	16 (right)	For the 16 days from old moon (still visible) until full moon and the 13 days from full moon until next old moon, together 29 days, the number of full days within a synodic month (29.5 days). After this period the moon has the same lunar phase again.
2	13 (left above)	For the 16 days from old moon (still visible) until full moon and the 13 days from full moon until next old moon, together 29 days, the number of full days within a synodic month (29.5 days). After this period the moon has the same lunar phase again.
3	3 + 4 (right) = 7	For the 7 full days of a moon quarter (7.4 days) respectively of a week.
3	3 (left)	For the 3 already completed moon quarters within the current month.
4	25	For the 25 waxing or waning moons (each 14.8 days) within a tropical year (365.2 days).
5	11	For the 11 additional days in a tropical year (365.2 days) in comparison to twelve synodic month (354.4 days).
6	24 + 1 = 25	For the 24 waxing respectively waning moons within twelve synodic month (354.4 days) plus an incomplete month until the end of the appropriate tropical year (365.2 days).
7	53	For the 53 weeks within a tropical year (365.2 days) respectively from a heliacal ascent or descent of the Pleiades (or stars) to the next one.

== Excavations and recent history ==
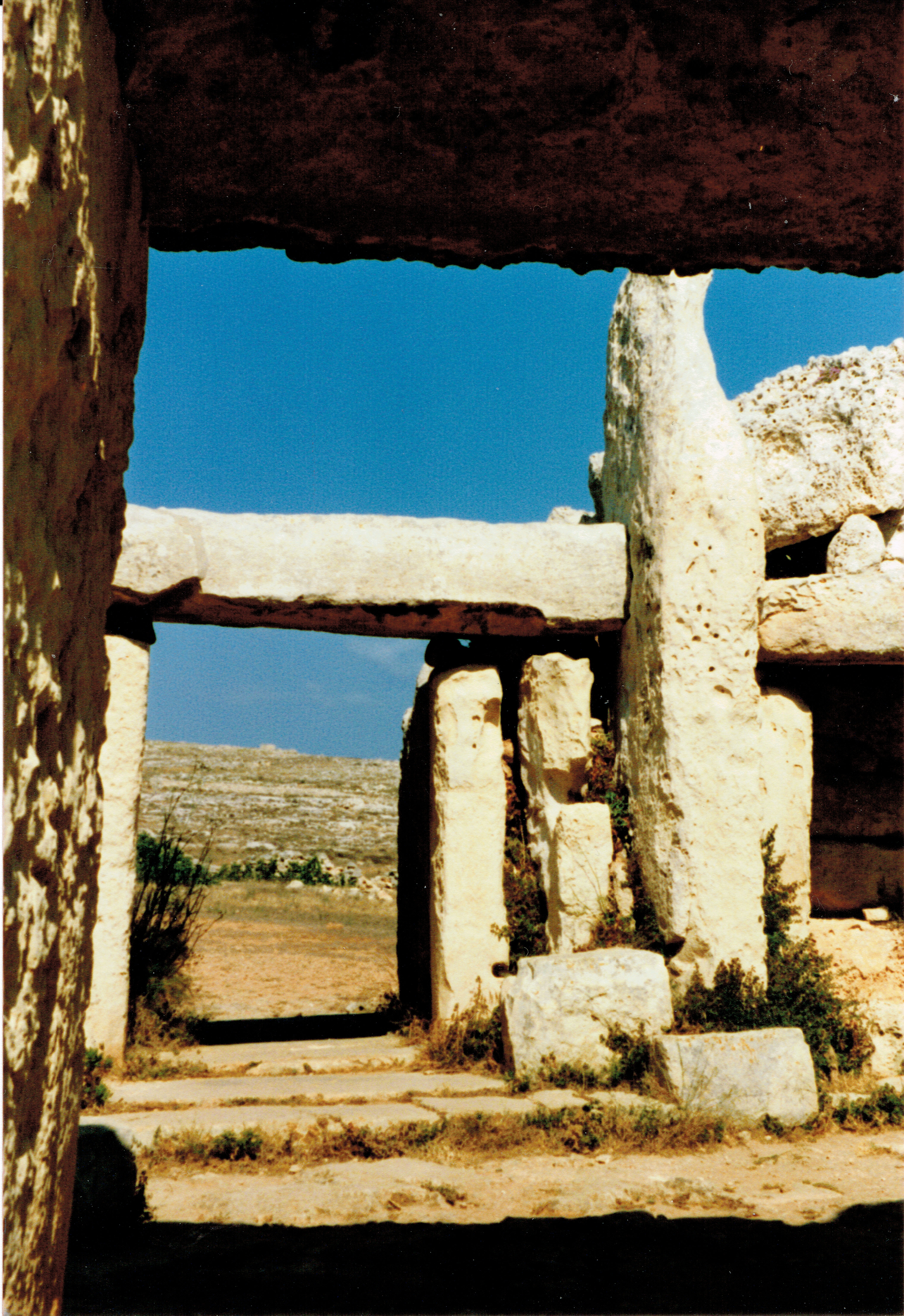
The temple complex

The excavations of the Mnajdra temples were performed under the direction of J.G. Vance in 1840, one year after the discovery of Ħagar Qim. In 1871, James Fergusson designed the first plan of the megalithic structure. The plan was quite inaccurate and hence in 1901, Albert Mayr made the first accurate plan which was based on his findings. In 1910, Thomas Ashby performed further investigations which resulted in the collection of the important archaeological material. Further excavations were performed in December 1949, in which two small statues, two large bowls, tools and one large spherical stone, which was probably used to move the temple's large stones, were discovered.

The temple was included on the Antiquities List of 1925.

Mnajdra was vandalized on 13 April 2001, when at least three people armed with crowbars toppled or broke about 60 megaliths, and inscribed graffiti on them. The attack was called "the worst act of vandalism ever committed on the island of Malta" by UNESCO. The damage to the temples was initially considered irreparable, but they were restored using new techniques making it difficult to tell where the megaliths had been damaged. The temples were reopened to the public in 2002.

The 1, 2 and 5 cent Maltese euro coins, minted since 2008, bear a representation of the Mnajdra temples on their obverse side.

A protective shelter was constructed around Mnajdra (along with Ħaġar Qim) in 2009.

== Contemporary interpretations ==
Anthropologist Kathryn Rountree has explored how "Malta’s neolithic temples", including Ġgantija, "have been interpreted, contested and appropriated by different local and foreign interest groups: those working in the tourist industry, intellectuals and Maltese nationalists, hunters, archaeologists, artists, and participants in the global Goddess movement."

One source from the early years of the twenty-first century speculates that the clover-shape of Mnajdra (presumably the Upper Temple) may represent "the present, past and future (or birth, life and death)", while the solar alignment could mean that "the Sun's Male-energy is also given an honored place in these temples", and that "mother earth was represented by statuettes while father sun was venerated through this temple alignment."

== Gallery ==
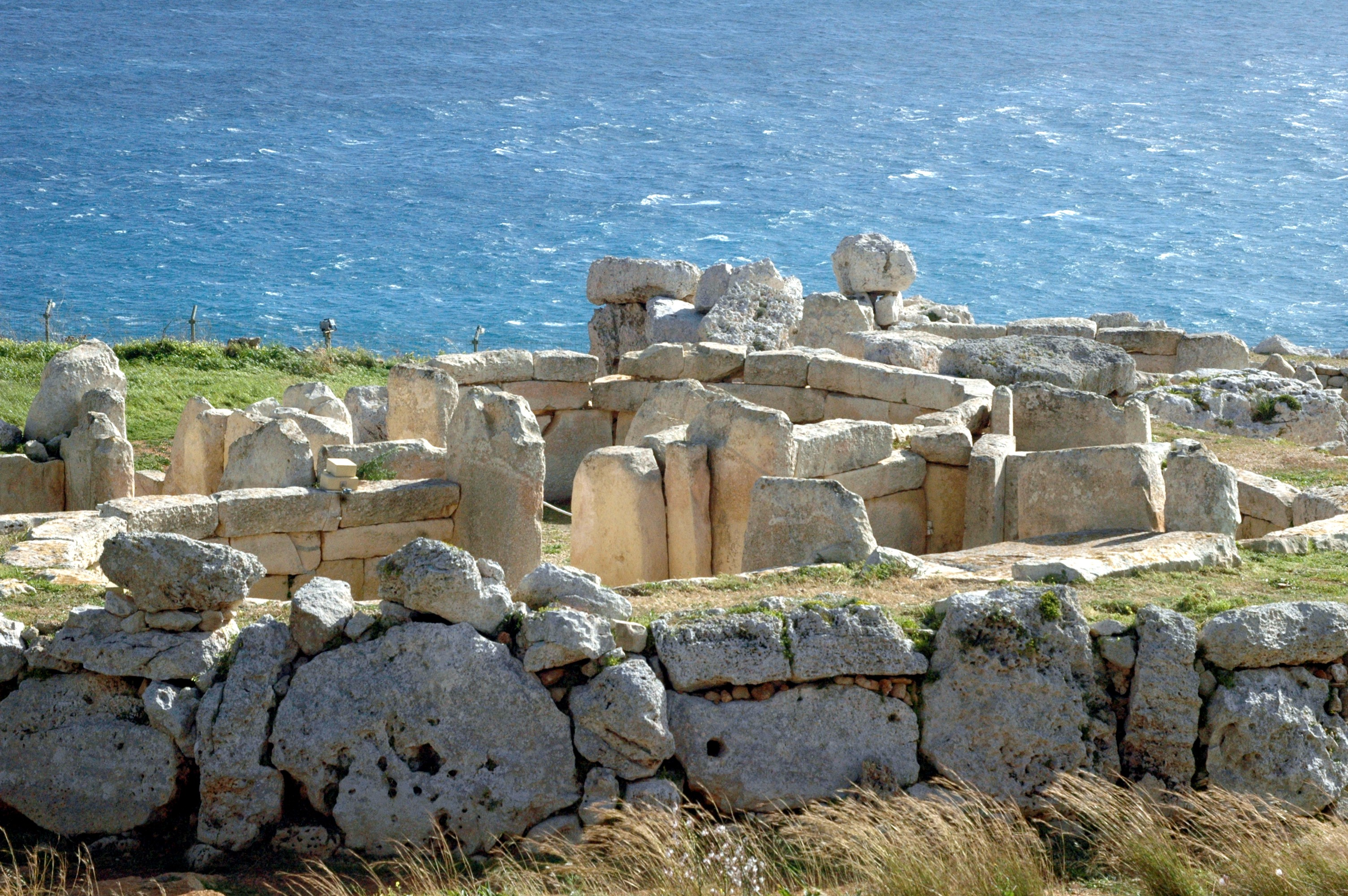
A total view of the structure

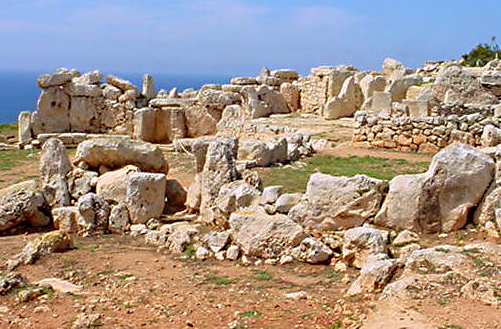
Ruins of the upper (oldest) temple

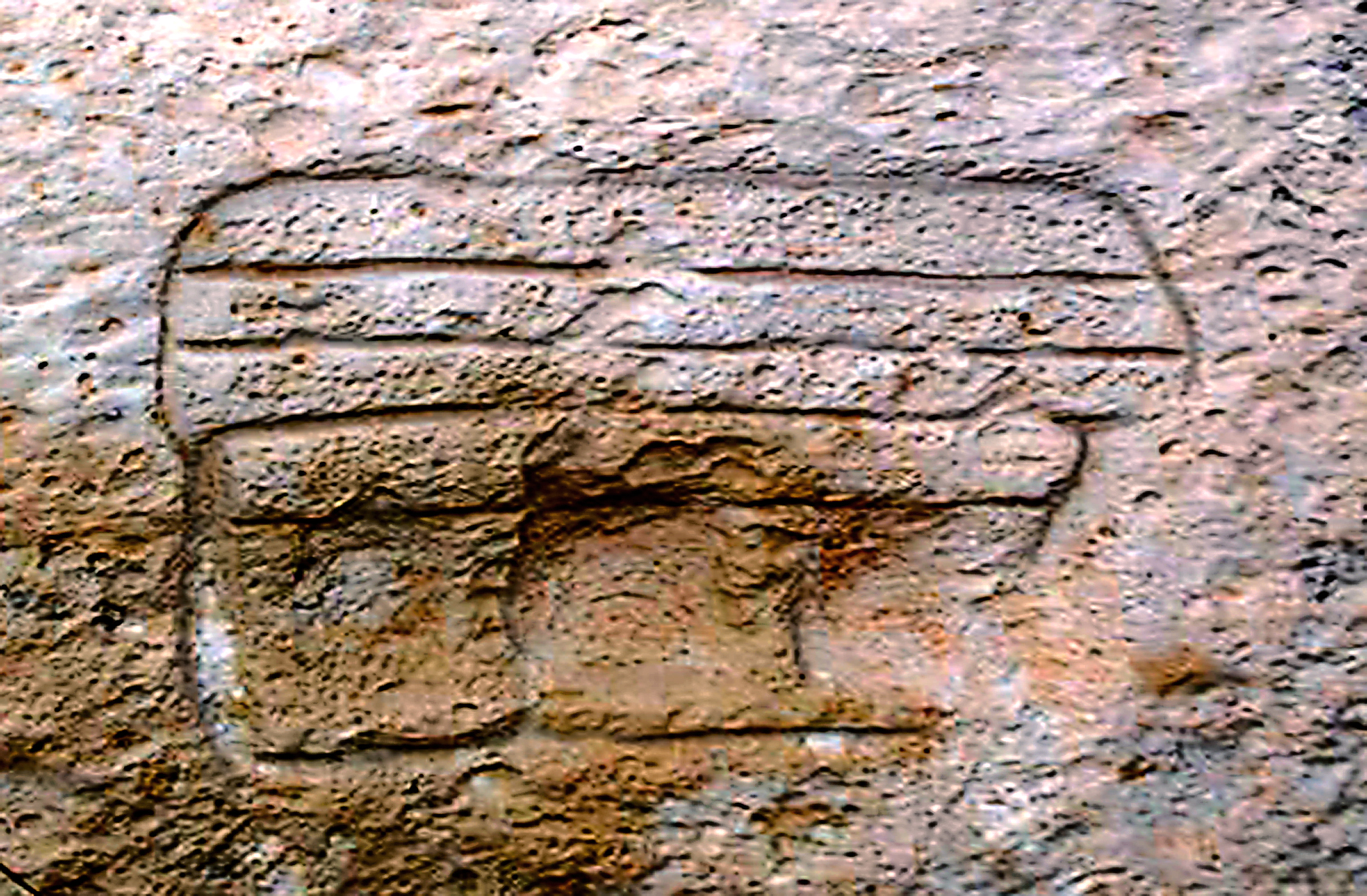
An important graffito representing a roofed megalithic temple found in Mnajdra

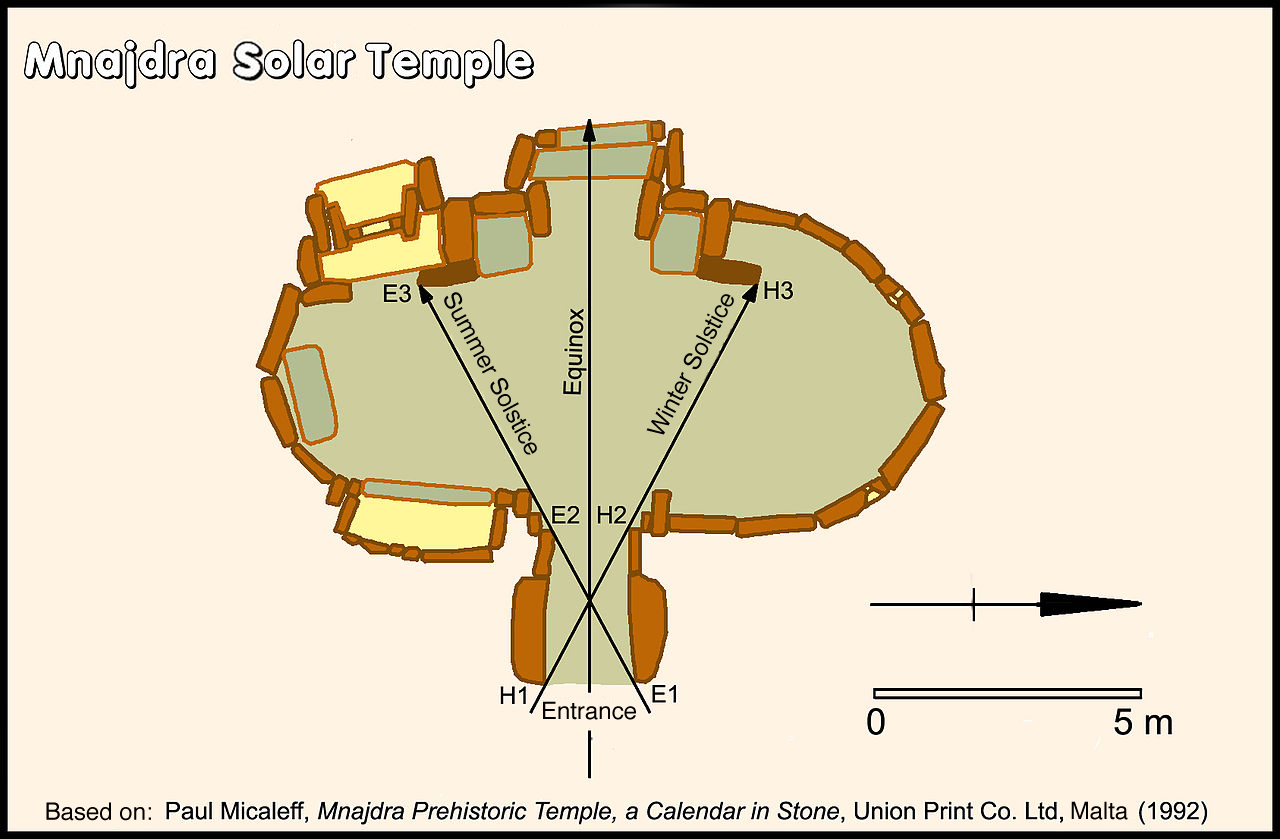
Solar angles

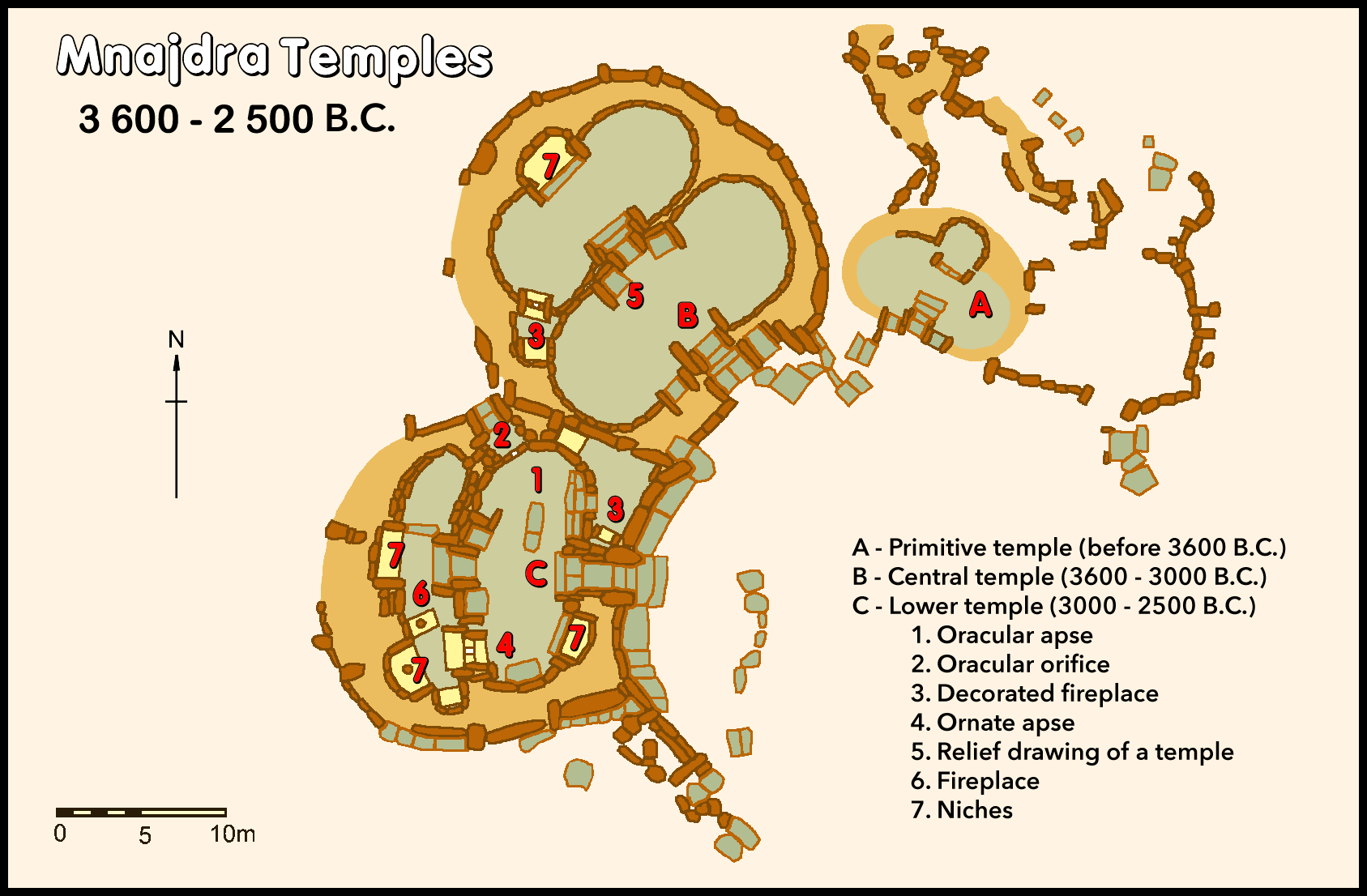
Map of the Mnajdra temple

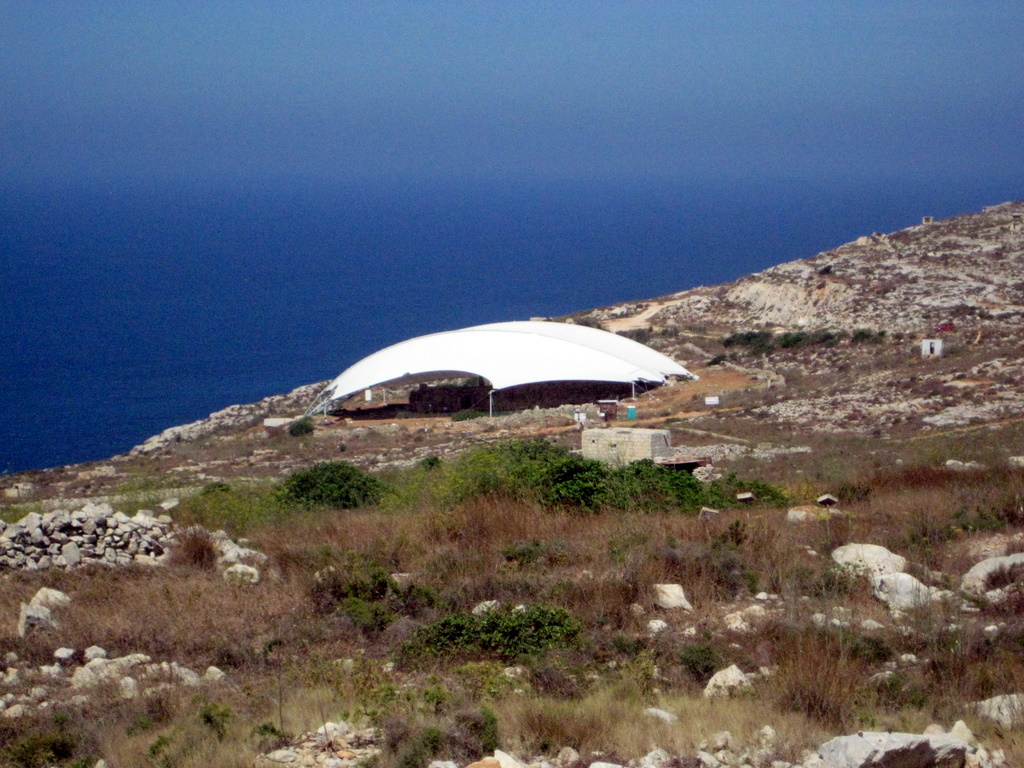
Protective tent around the site

== See also ==
- Ġgantija
- Ħaġar Qim
- Hypogeum of Ħal-Saflieni
- List of megalithic sites
- Tarxien Temples
