= Ġgantija =

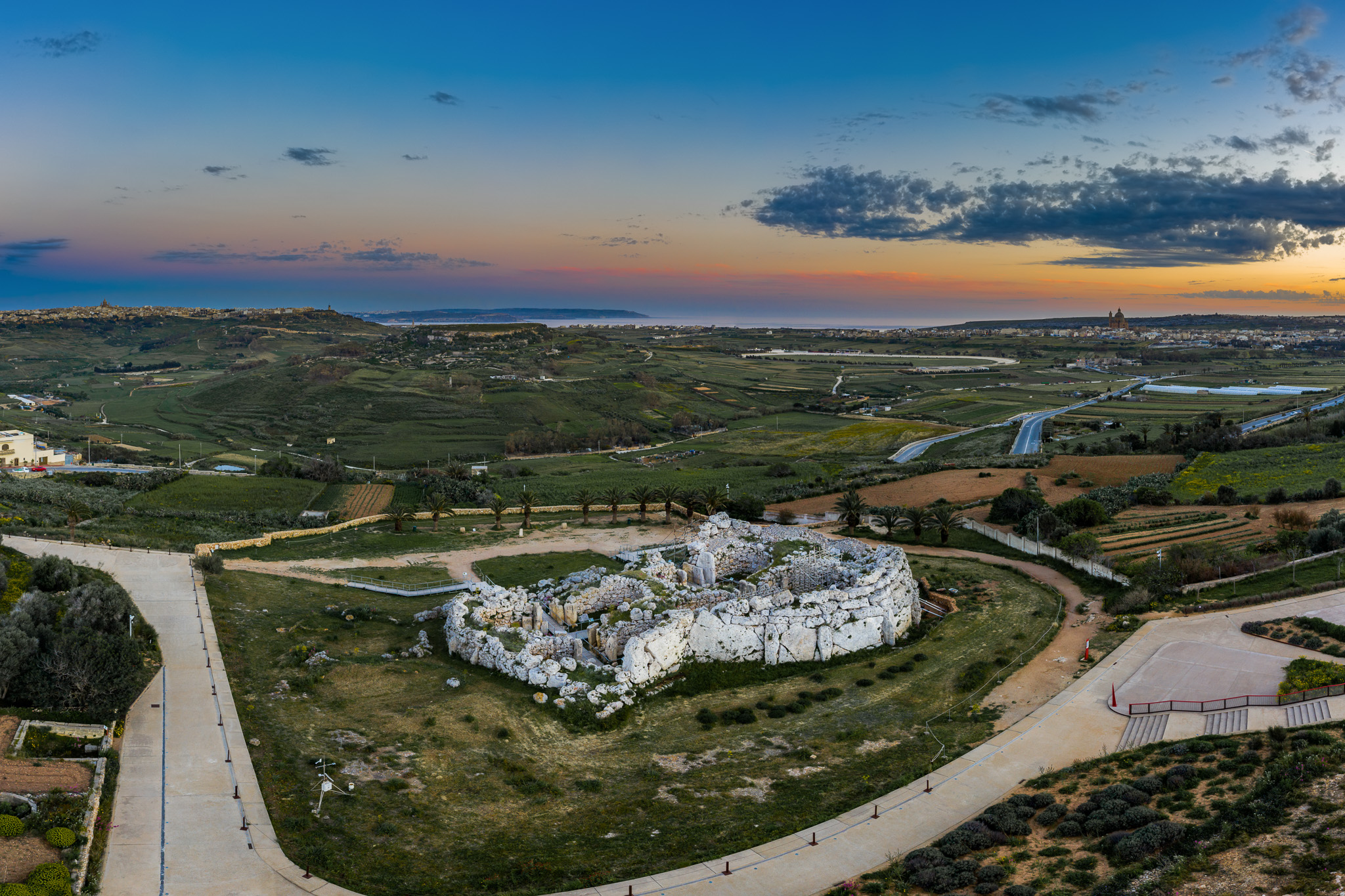
- The temple in 2020

- Location in Malta
- 36°02′50″N 14°16′09″E
- Type: Temple
- Periods: Ġgantija phase
- Location: Xagħra, Gozo, Malta

History
- Built: c. 3600 BC

Site notes
- Material: Limestone
- Height: 6 m (20 ft)
- Excavation dates: 1827, 1933, 1936, 1949, 1956–1957, 1958–1959
- Condition: Well-preserved ruins
- Owner: Government of Malta
- Management: Heritage Malta
- Public access: Yes
- Website: Heritage Malta

UNESCO World Heritage Site
- Official name: Ġgantija Temples
- Part of: Megalithic Temples of Malta
- Criteria: Cultural: (iv)
- Reference: 132ter-001
- Inscription: 1980 (4th Session)
- Extensions: 1992, 2015
- Area: 0.715 ha (77,000 sq ft)
- Buffer zone: 33 ha (0.13 sq mi)

Ġgantija (Maltese pronunciation: [d͡ʒɡɐnˈtiːjɐ]; "place of giants") is a megalithic temple complex from the Neolithic era (c. 3600–2500 BC), on the Mediterranean island of Gozo in Malta. The Ġgantija temples are the earliest of the Megalithic Temples of Malta and are older than the pyramids of Egypt. Their makers erected the two Ġgantija temples during the Neolithic, which makes these temples more than 5,500 years old and the world's second-oldest existing manmade religious structures after Göbekli Tepe in present-day Turkey. Together with other similar structures, these have been designated a UNESCO World Heritage Site, the Megalithic Temples of Malta.

The temples are elements of a ceremonial site used in a fertility rite. Researchers have found that the numerous figurines and statues found on the site are associated with that cult. According to local Gozitan folklore, a giantess named Sansuna who ate nothing but fava beans and honey bore a child from a man of the common people. With the child hanging from her shoulder, she built these temples and used them as places of worship.

== Description and design ==
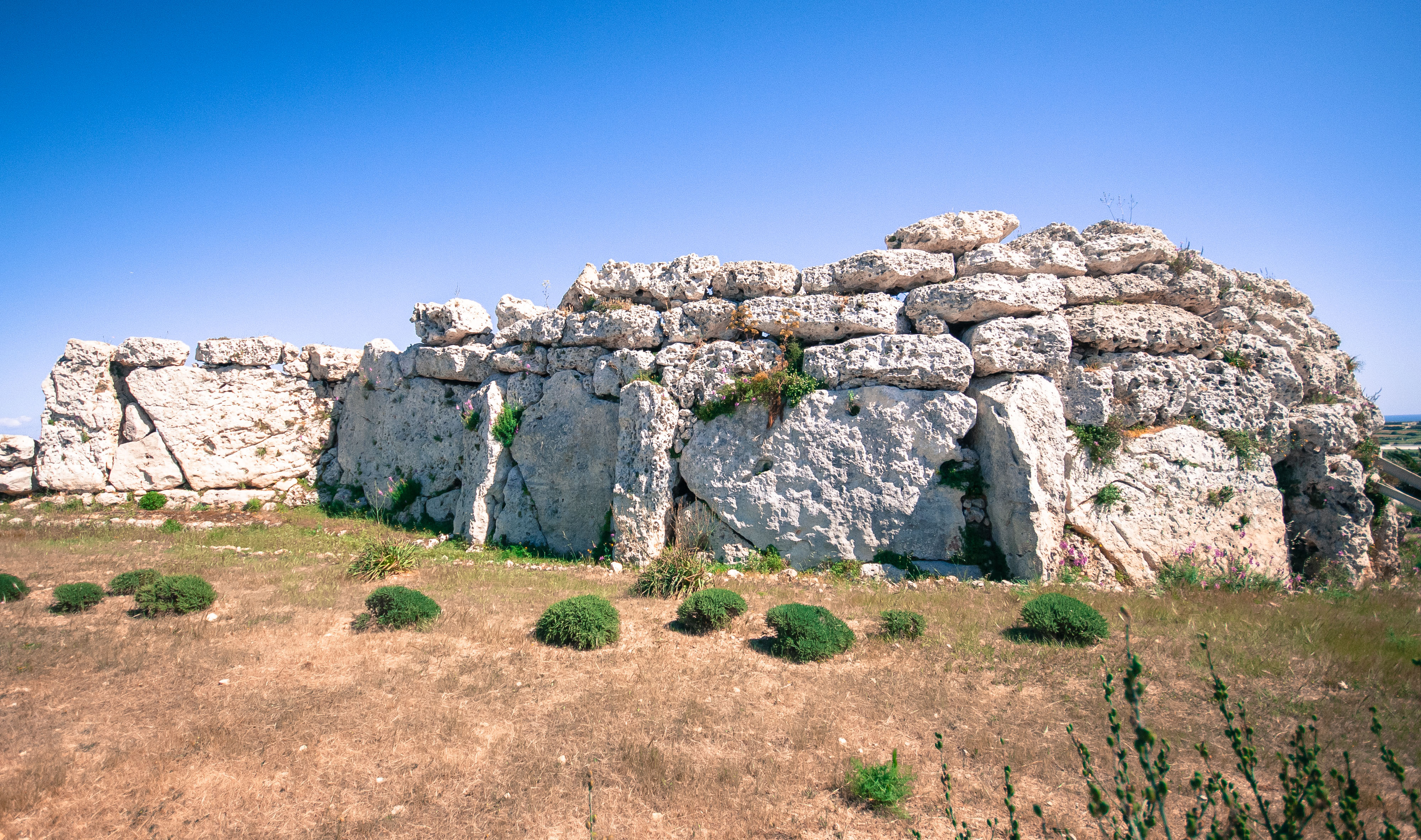
Ġgantija as seen from the west

The Ġgantija temples stand at the edge of the Xagħra plateau, facing toward the southeast. This megalithic monument encompasses two temples and an incomplete third, of which only the facade was partially built before being abandoned. Like Mnajdra South, it faces the equinox sunrise, built side by side and enclosed within a boundary wall. The southerly one is the larger and older one, dating back to around 3600 BC. It is also better preserved. The plan of the temple incorporates five large apses, with traces of the plaster that once covered the irregular wall still clinging between the blocks.

The temple, like other megalithic sites in Malta, faces southeast. The southern temple rises to a height of 6 m (19.69 ft). At the entrance sits a large stone block with a recess, which led to the hypothesis that this was a ritual ablution station for purification before worshippers entered the complex.

== Excavations and recognition ==
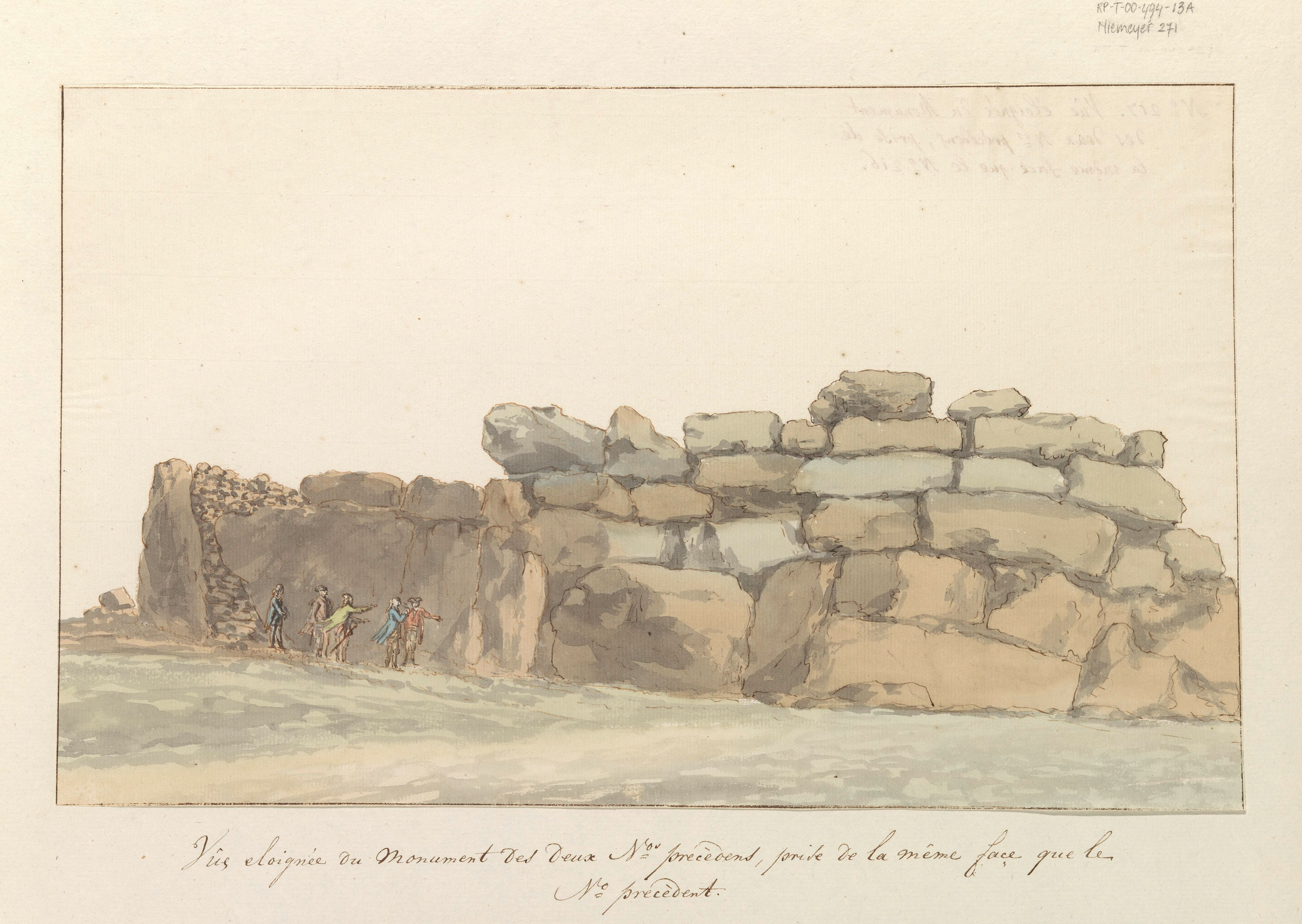
Watercolour painting of the temple ruins by Abraham-Louis-Rodolphe Ducros, 1778

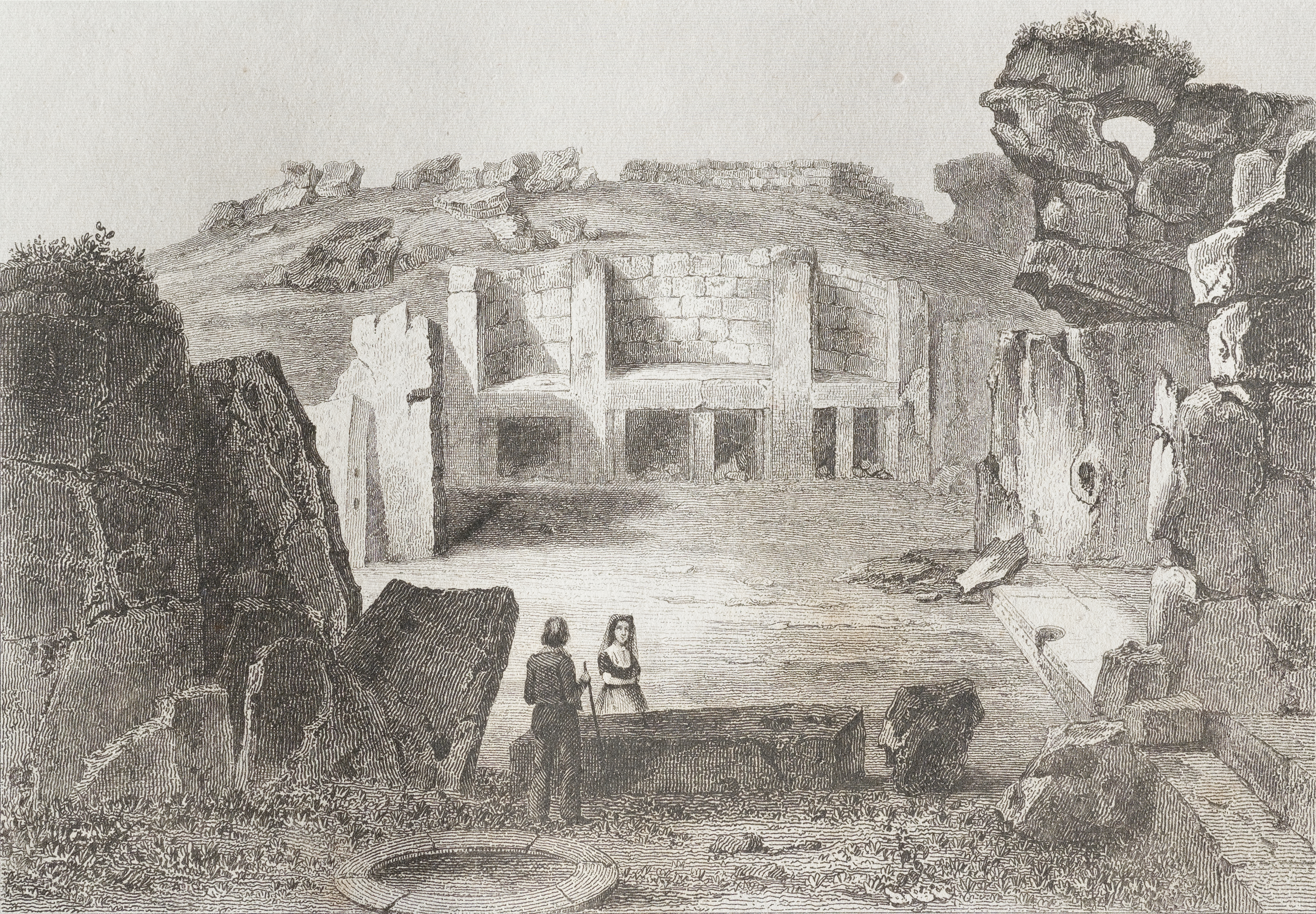
Engraving of the temple by Augustin Lemaitre, 1848

Residents and travelers knew about the existence of the temple for a long time. In the late 18th century, before any excavations were carried out, Jean-Pierre Houël drew a plan based on that knowledge, which has been found to be highly accurate. In 1827, Col. John Otto Bayer, the Lieutenant Governor of Gozo, had the site cleared of debris. The soil and remains were lost without having been properly examined. German artist Charles Frederick de Brocktorff had painted a picture of the site within a year or two prior to the removal of the debris, so he made a record of the site before clearance.

After the excavations were conducted in 1827, the ruins fell into decay. The remains were included on the Antiquities List of 1925.

The Ġgantija temples were listed as a UNESCO World Heritage Site in 1980. In 1992, the Committee decided to expand the listing to include five other megalithic temples located across the islands of Malta and Gozo. The Ġgantija listing was renamed "the Megalithic Temples of Malta".

The temple and the surrounding areas were restored or rehabilitated in the 2000s. Lightweight walkways were installed in the temple in 2011, to protect the floor. A heritage park was developed and opened in 2013.

== Contemporary interpretations ==
Anthropologist Kathryn Rountree has explored how "Malta’s neolithic temples", including Ġgantija, "have been interpreted, contested and appropriated by different local and foreign interest groups: those working in the tourist industry, intellectuals and Maltese nationalists, hunters, archaeologists, artists, and participants in the global Goddess movement."

Reportedly, some Goddess tours refer to the two temples at Ġgantija "as the Mother & Daughter Temple."

== Gallery ==
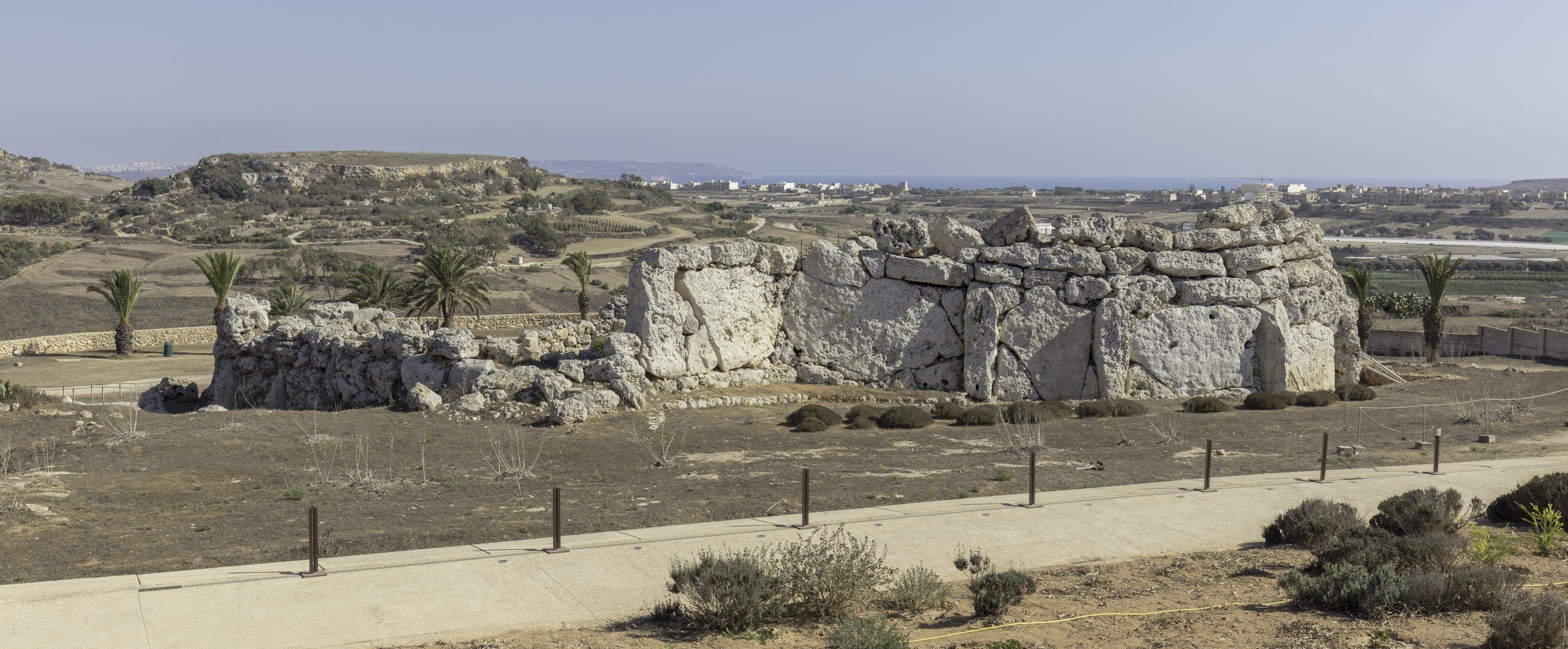
Ġgantija Temple

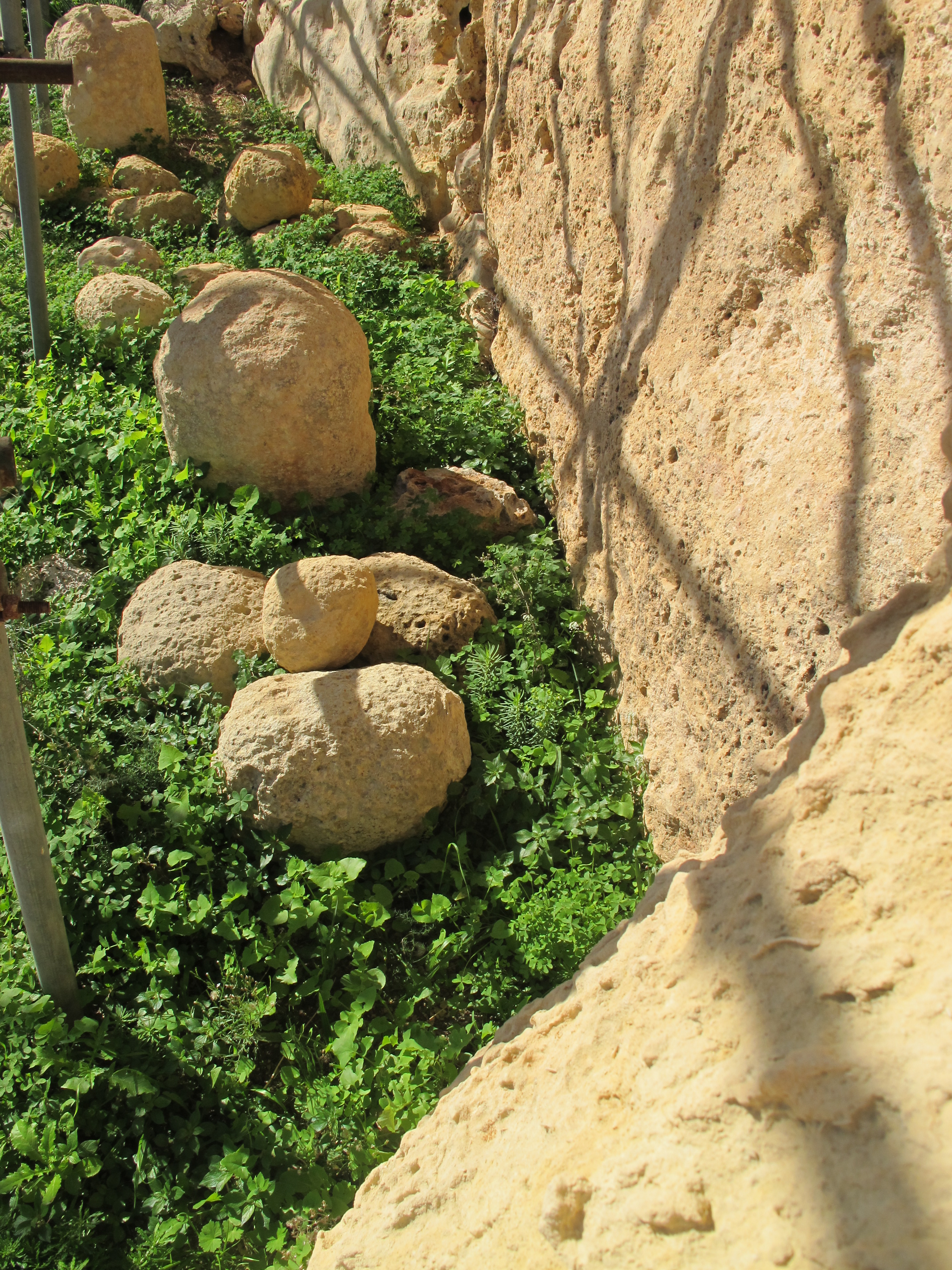
Stone spheres found at Ġgantija. Scholars suggest these were used to transport the enormous stone blocks for the temples.

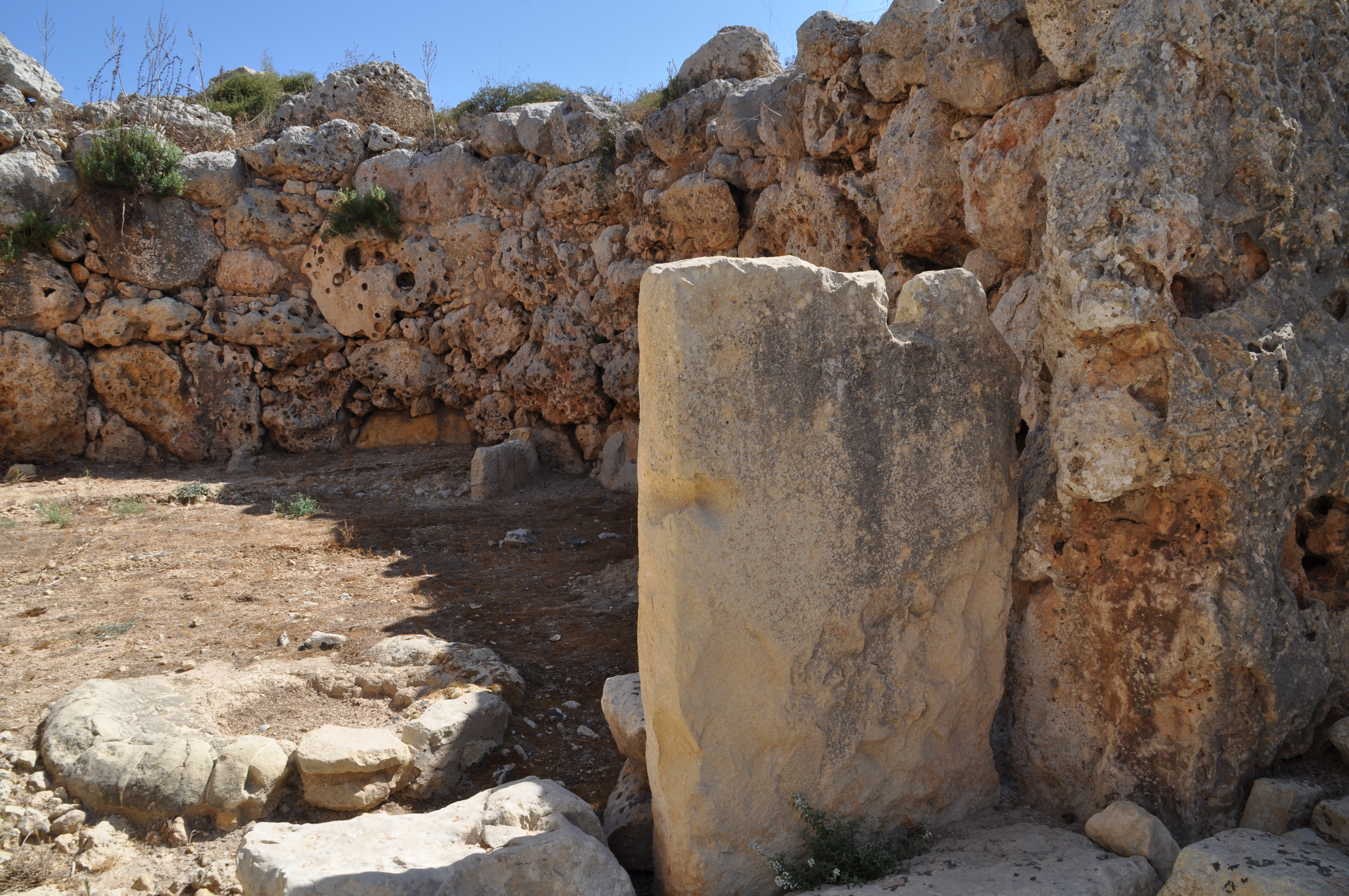
Possible Eternal flame in the south complex

== See also ==
- Megalithic Temples of Malta
- Ħaġar Qim
- Hypogeum of Ħal-Saflieni
- List of megalithic sites
- Mnajdra
- Tarxien Temples
