= Ħaġar Qim =

Megalithic temple complex in Malta

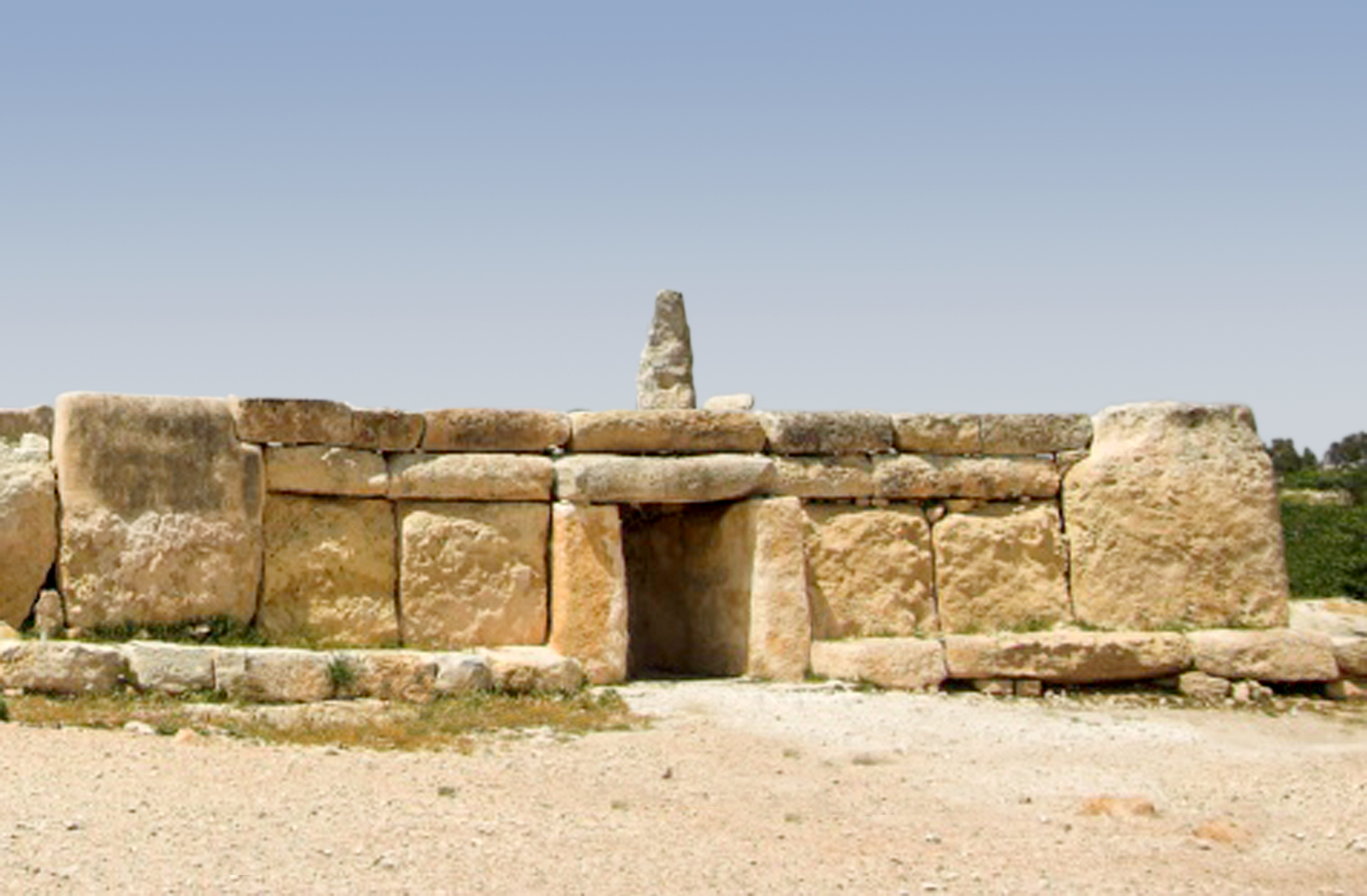
- Facade of the main temple of Ħaġar Qim, seen prior to the 2009 construction of a protective shelter

- Location in Malta
- 35°49′40″N 14°26′32″E
- Type: Temple
- Periods: Ġgantija phase
- Location: Qrendi, Southern Region, Malta

History
- Built: c. 3400 BC

Site notes
- Material: Limestone
- Excavation dates: 1839, 1885, 1909-1910, 1949-1950
- Archaeologists: J. G. Vance; Antonio Caruana; Themistocles Zammit; Thomas Peet; John Evans
- Condition: Well-preserved ruins
- Owner: Government of Malta
- Management: Heritage Malta
- Public access: Yes
- Website: shows information about Hagar Qim Heritage Malta

UNESCO World Heritage Site
- Part of: Megalithic Temples of Malta
- Criteria: Cultural: (iv)
- Reference: 132ter-002
- Inscription: 1980 (4th Session)
- Extensions: 1992, 2015
- Area: 0.813 ha (87,500 sq ft)

Ħaġar Qim (Maltese pronunciation: [ˈħɐd͡ʒɐr ˈʔiːm]; lit. 'Worshipping Stones') is a megalithic temple complex found on the Mediterranean island of Malta, dating from the Ġgantija phase (3600–3200 BC). The Megalithic Temples of Malta are among the most ancient religious sites on Earth, described by the World Heritage Sites committee as "unique architectural masterpieces." In 1992 UNESCO recognized Ħaġar Qim and four other Maltese megalithic structures as World Heritage Sites. V. Gordon Childe, Professor of Prehistoric European Archeology and director of the Institute of Archaeology in the University of London from 1946 to 1957 visited Ħaġar Qim. He wrote, "I have been visiting the prehistoric ruins all round the Mediterranean, from Mesopotamia to Egypt, Greece and Switzerland, but I have nowhere seen a place as old as this one."

Ħaġar Qim's builders used globigerina limestone in the temple's construction. As a result of this, the temple has suffered from severe weathering and surface flaking over the millennia. In 2009, work was completed on a protective tent.

== Overview ==
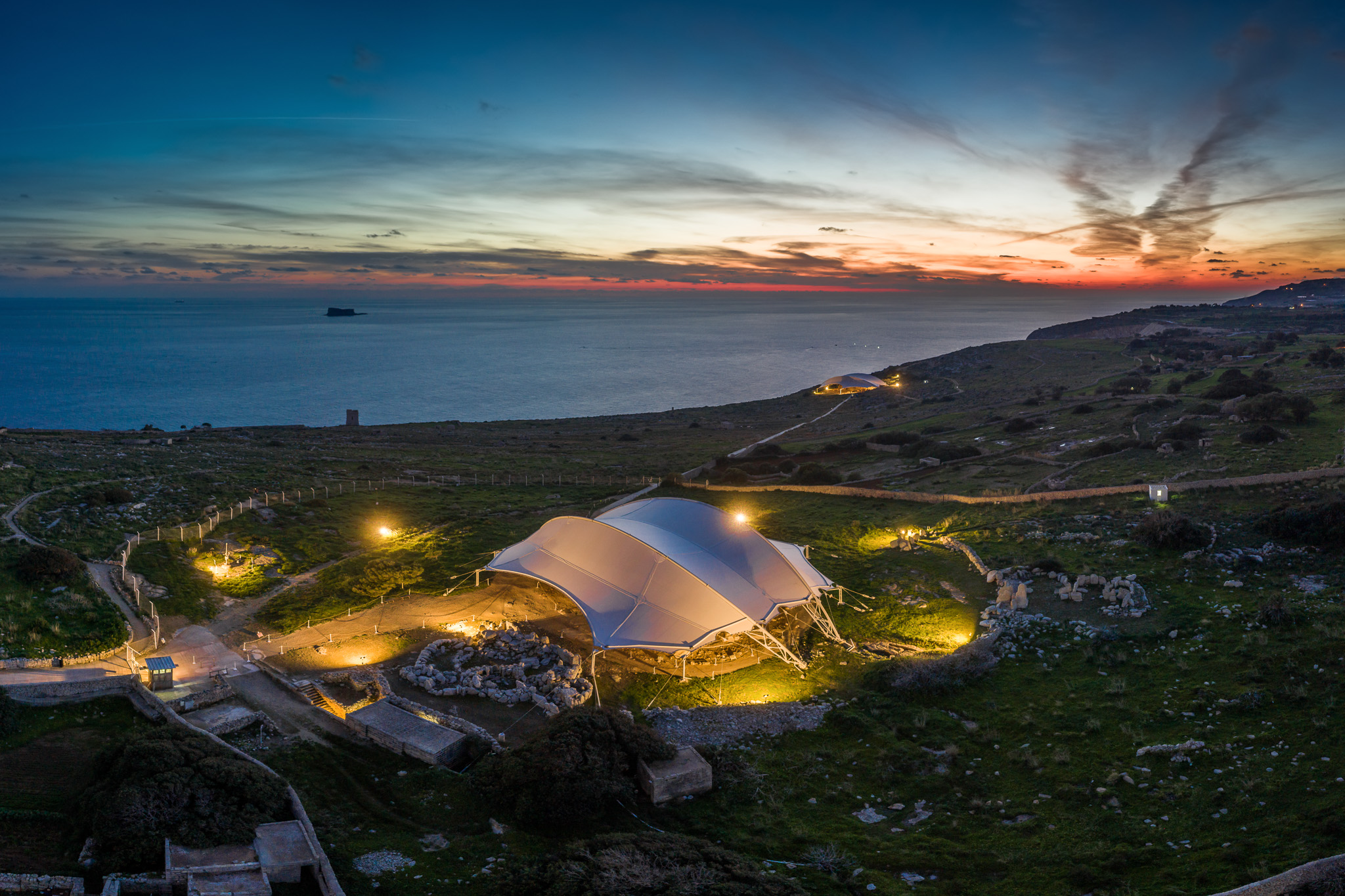
Ħaġar Qim complex at dusk

The megalithic complex of Ħaġar Qim is located on the southern edge of the island of Malta, on a ridge capped in soft globigerina limestone. Globigerina limestone is the second oldest rock on Malta, outcropping over approximately 70% of the area of the islands. The builders used this stone throughout the temple architecture. All exposed rock on the island was deposited during the Oligocene and Miocene periods of geological time.

The temple's façade is characterized by a trilithon entrance, outer bench and orthostats. It has a wide forecourt with a retaining wall and a passage runs through the middle of the building, following a modified Maltese megalithic design. A separate entrance gives access to four independent enclosures which replace the north-westerly apse.

Features of temple architecture reveal possible associations with fertility rituals, including corpulent figurines and statuary, together with solar alignments and a megalith which it has been argued is phallic. The presence of an altar with a concave top indicated a possible use for animal sacrifices. It has also been suggested that screened doorways at the heart of the complex point towards possible use by oracles. Excavation also uncovered decorated pottery. The best examples can be seen at The National Museum of Archaeology.

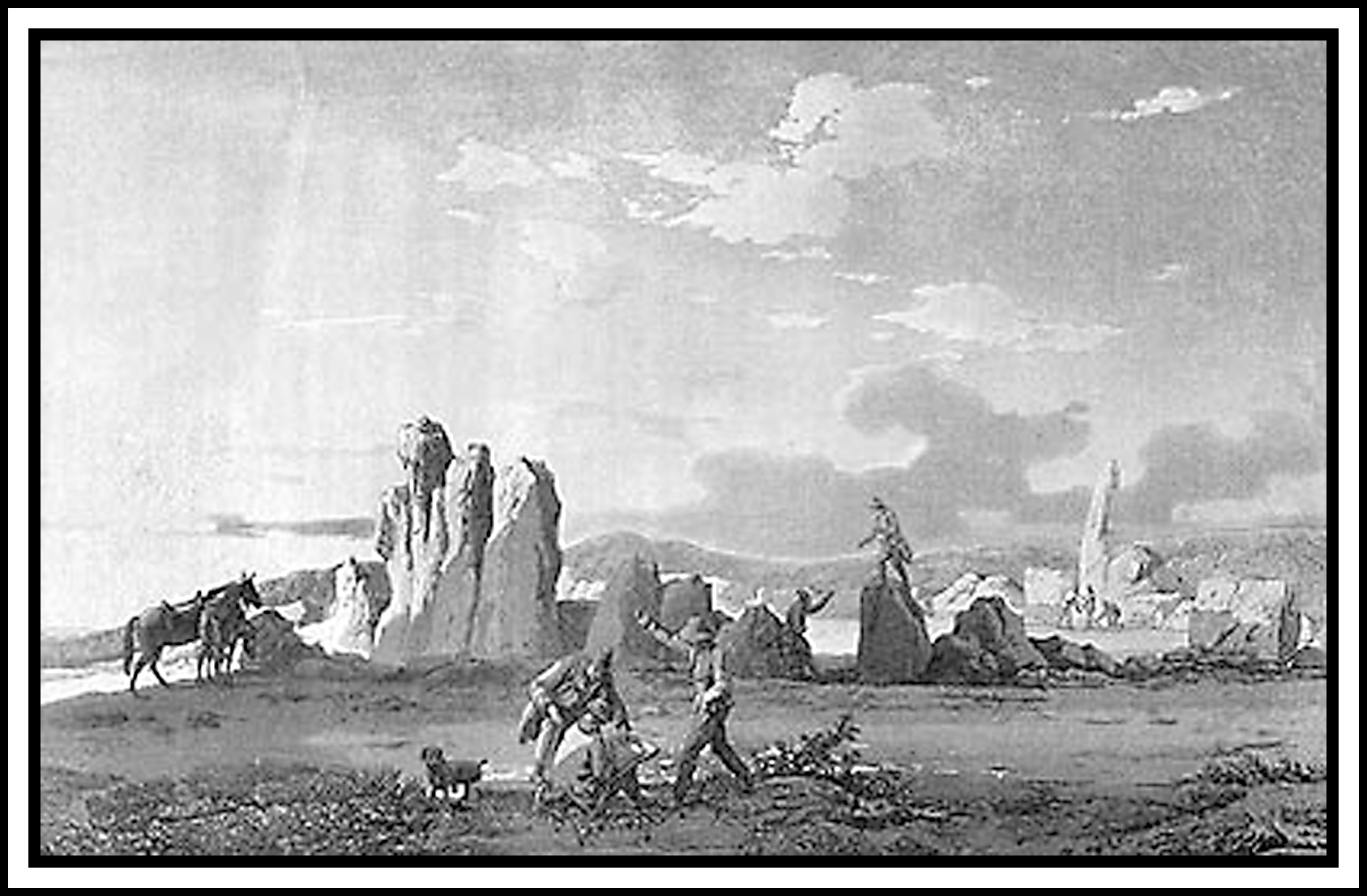
A 1776 engraving of Ħaġar Qim by Jean-Pierre Houël

No burials exist in the temple or the area surrounding Ħaġar Qim, nor have any human bones been discovered in Maltese temples. Bones of numerous sacrificial animals have been found. It is theorized that the Ħaġar Qim complex was built in three stages, beginning with the 'Old Temple' northern apses, followed by the 'New Temple', and finally the completion of the entire structure.

A few hundred metres from the temple is one of the thirteen watchtowers built by Grand Master Martin de Redin, called Ħamrija Tower. A memorial to General Sir Walter Congreve, Governor of Malta from 1924 to 1927, is located nearby. The village of Qrendi is a further two kilometres (1.2 miles) southwest of the temple complex.

== Temple complex ==
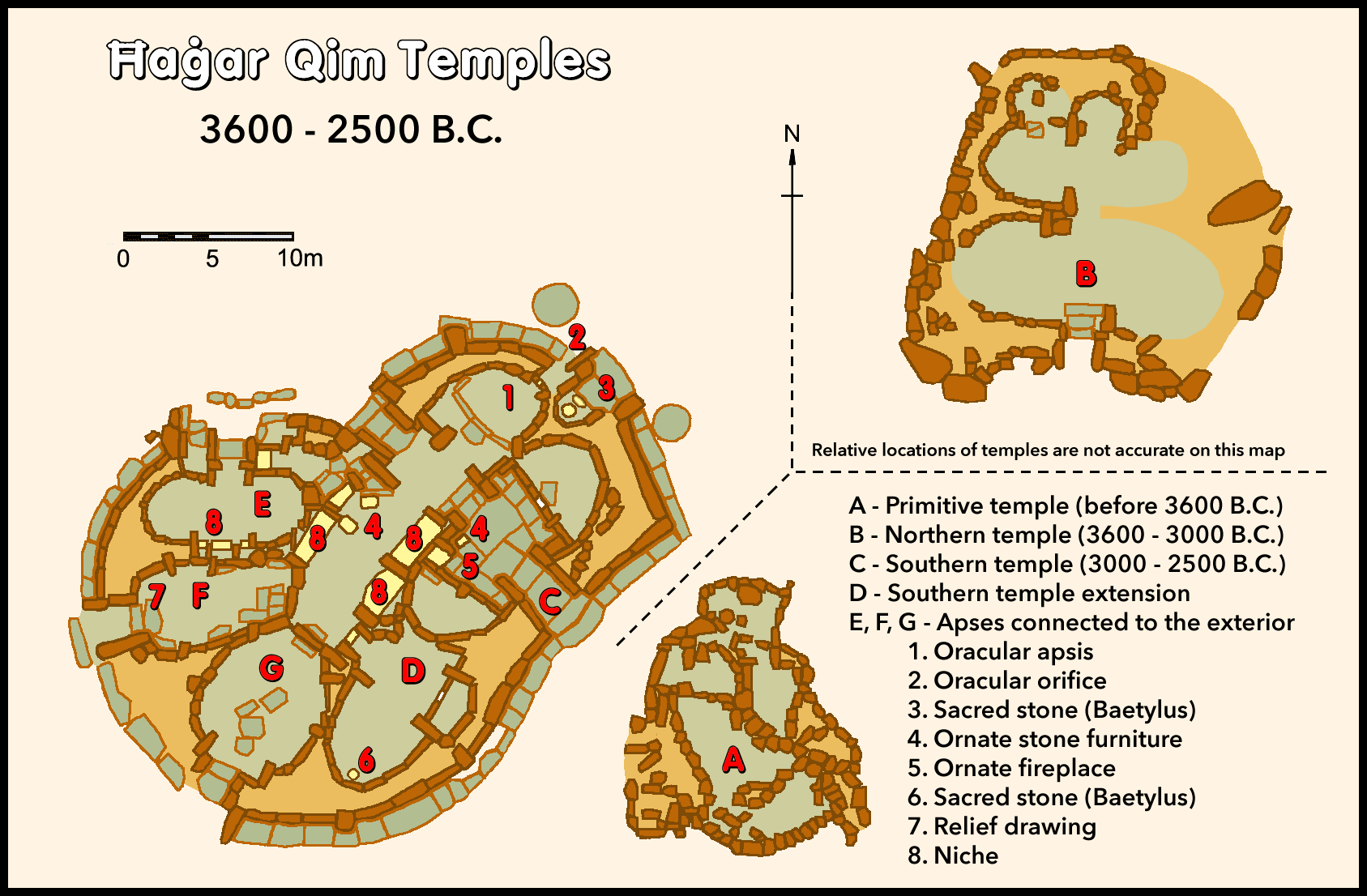
Map of the Temples

The Ħaġar Qim complex consists of a main temple and three additional megalithic structures beside it. The main temple was built between 3600 and 3200 BC; however, the northern ruins are considerably older. The outside entrance serves as an interior passage and connects six large chambers. The right apse is constructed as an arch to prevent the upright slabs falling inward. The outside wall, built of huge upright blocks, projects inwards, thus creating an extremely solid building. This entrance passage and first court follow the Maltese megalithic pattern but as building progressed, this design was considerably modified. The northwesterly apse was replaced by four independent enclosures.

Ħaġar Qim shares its basic architectural design with the Mnajdra, Tarxien, and Ġgantija temple complexes. The basic shape includes forecourt and façade, elongated oval chambers, semi-circular recesses and a central passage connecting the chambers. This configuration is commonly termed "trefoil". It is also suggested that the shape of the temple in some way mimics the sacred sculptures found within them.

=== Temple forecourt ===
An extensive forecourt paved with large, irregular slabs occupies the area before the outer wall. It is a solid floor, encumbered with large blocks that once formed part of the walls or a series of chambers. One of the paving stones is pierced through and is theorized to have once served the purpose of a fireplace. The Ħaġar Qim forecourt shares many characteristics with Mnajdra's southern temple forecourt.

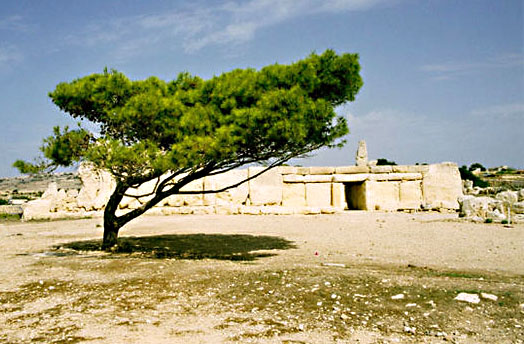
The Ħaġar Qim forecourt

=== Dwelling-houses and bastion ===
A group of middle-sized stones form small, semi-circular areas commonly referred to as "dwelling-houses". Alongside these, four rectangular monoliths approximately two-feet thick enclose a rectangular area, leaving an entrance in one corner.

The bastion flanks the temple and is built from large stone blocks. Its western wall is about 20 metres long, curving in on itself towards the main temple and an outdoor shrine. It has been theorized that this was done to protect the complex from wild animals, which are known to have been plentiful at that time on the islands. It also distinguished the temples as sacred spaces.

The Ħaġar Qim façade contains the largest stone used in Maltese megalithic architecture, weighing 57 tons. The upright menhir stands 5.2 m (17 ft) high. Erosion has affected the outer southern wall where the orthostats are exposed to sea-winds. Over the millennia, the temple has suffered severe weathering and surface flaking.

=== Northern temple ===
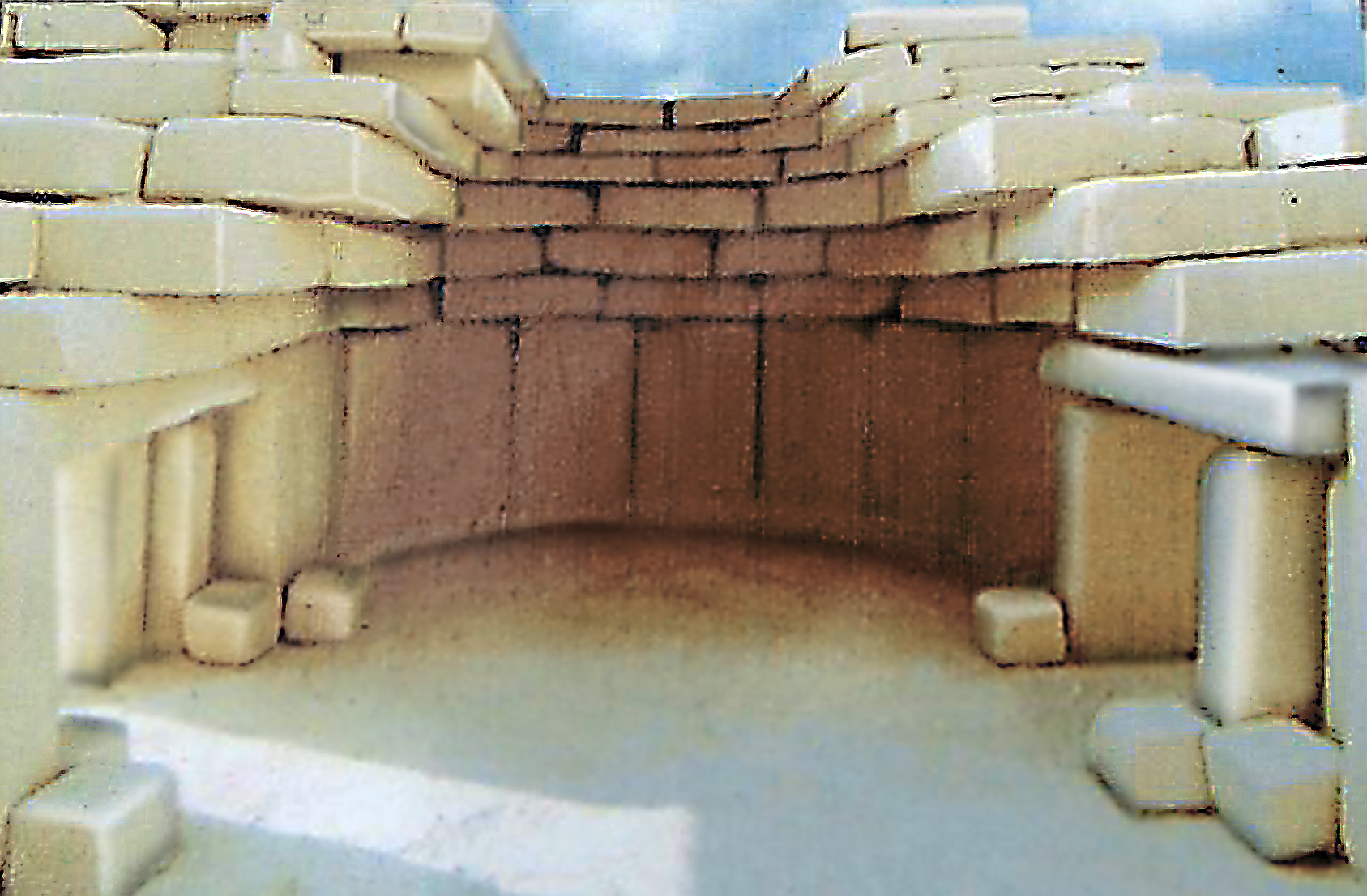
Reconstruction of the temple roof

The northern temple is the oldest part of Ħaġar Qim, containing an oval chamber with a semi-circular apse on each side. Following the second doorway is another chamber with similar apses.

The northern temple uniquely has three insulated layers of flooring. The pavement on the topmost level is not marked by sacrificial fires, unlike the lower floors. Due to the different methods used in polishing the stone, scholars have theorized that the three layers of pavement illustrate three major shifts in construction at Ħaġar Qim.

Stone balls of different sizes are located alongside the walls of the northern temple and other parts of the structure. These are theorized to have been the rollers used to transport the megaliths. Excavations have revealed such rollers buried beneath the megaliths, thus contributing to a solid foundation.

=== First Recess - Northern Temple ===
The Northern Temple's first recess contains a round stone pillar and a rectangular slab held vertically ahead of the pillar. Resting on the slab are spherical hollows which may have served as holders in which to stand small libation jars. Jars excavated from the site are characterized by a specifically oval base, designed to stand upright when placed in the slab.

Remnants of the vertical blocks which once flanked the recess are still observable today. To the right of this chamber is another recess, containing an acoustic opening called the "oracle hole". Sound passed from the main chamber into the recess, and vice versa. The hole has also been linked to alignments of the Summer solstice. On the right side of the chamber is a horizontal block that may have served as seating.

=== Main temple ===
Beyond the temple entrance is an oval area 14.3 m (47 ft) long and 5.5 m (18 ft) wide with large slab walls, originally topped by courses of masonry. The two apsidal ends are separated from the central court by two vertical slabs pierced by rectangular openings. These openings are thought to have been adorned with curtains to limit access to the side apses.

The central area is paved with well-set smooth blocks, and along the walls are low stone altars, originally decorated with pit-marks. Some of these blocks are discolored by fire. In 1839, archaeologists discovered important objects in this court, now shown in the Valletta Museum. These include stone statuettes, a detailed altar-stone with deep carvings representing vegetation, a stone slab with spirals in relief and a displaced sill-stone.

The right-hand apse once held a pen, theoretically intended for the corralling of animals. The left-hand apse has a high trilithon altar on its left, two others on right with one in a smaller chamber. An additional chamber beyond it combines a central court, niche and right apse.

=== The niche ===
A doorway into the small enclosure follows an elaborately pit-marked annex, flanked by distinctively shaped stone altars with rounded and raised edges. The foot of one altar is pierced by two elliptical holes, one above the other.

The entrance to the enclosure is well-paved and neatly flanked by slabs on end. A threshold is provided by a couple of conical pits connected at the apex, demonstrating the "rope holes" seen in many other Maltese temples. Heavy slabs form a niche to the left of the entrance, to the right a cell contains an altar constructed out of a single block of stone and deeply discolored by action of fire. This space is theorized to have been the most sacred in the temple.

At the front of the enclosure, the passage widens into a quadrangular area with an elaborate cell at the end. A slab, 0.9 meters high, blocks the entrance to this cell at floor level, and another slab rests on two pillars. This layout reduces the whole section to a rectangular window-like opening. Beyond this opening there is a small room. The first excavators failed to conclusively report what was found in this recess. In comparison with the Tarxien Temples, it is presumed to have contained the bones of sacrificed animals and ritually broken pottery.

=== The watering place ===
Il-Misqa (English: the watering place), is a flat area of bare rock atop a hill nearby the temple complex. It contains seven bell-shaped reservoirs, five of which still hold water after average rainfall. The two wells which no longer hold water are the deepest and are joined as a single tank through subterranean channels. A monolith surmounts one of the dry holes and is theorized to have been used in drawing water from the well. An eighth well exists but is blocked up by a mature fig tree.

The water-channels cut in the surface of the rock distribute rain-water into the wells individually and the level of water in any well is kept relative to that of the immediately adjoining well.

== Excavation and restoration ==
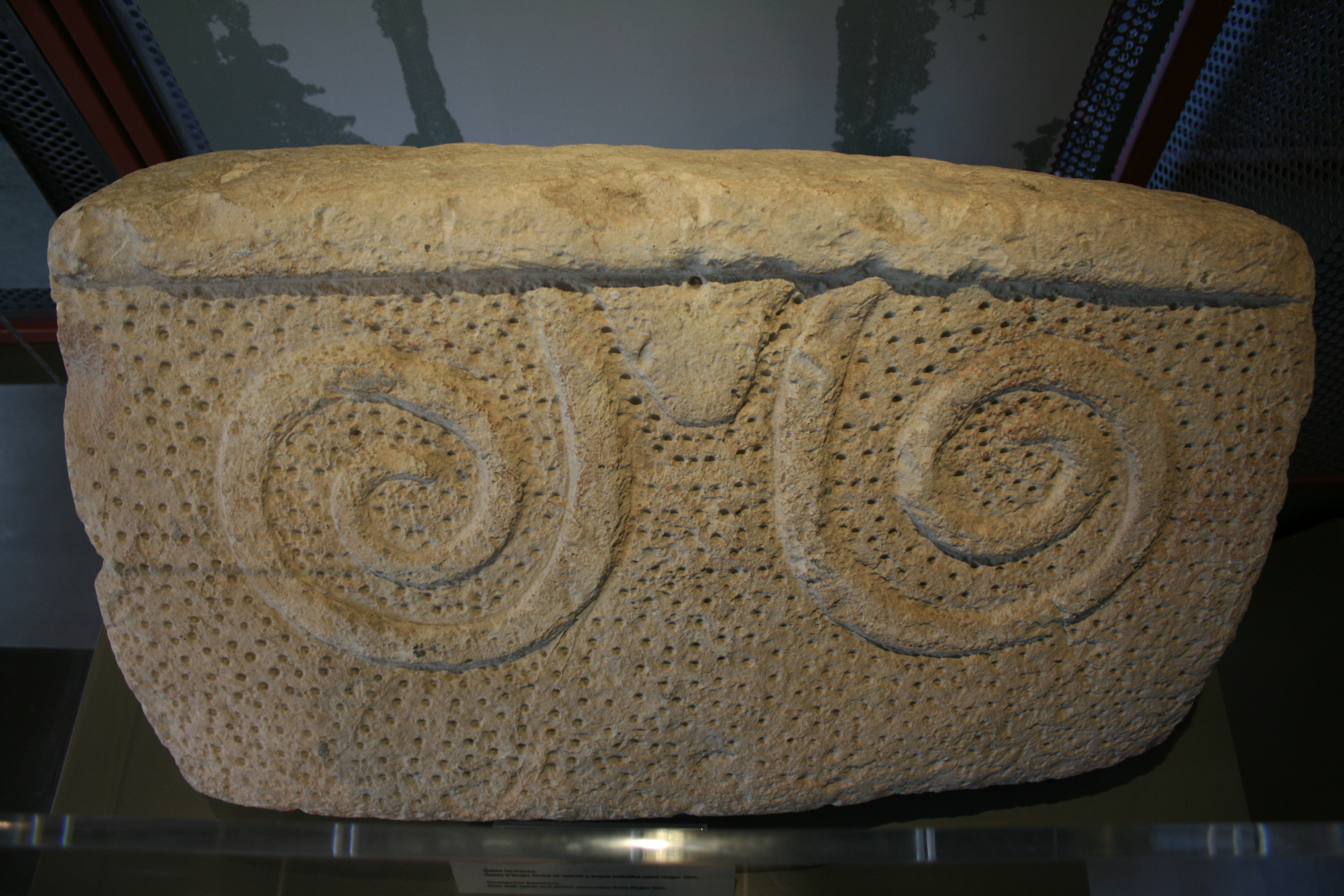
Globigerina limestone "slab with spiral and drilled decoration."

The seventeenth-century Maltese historian Giovanni Francesco Abela wrote in his 1647 Della Descrittione di Malta isola nel Mare Siciliano that the ruins of Ħaġar Qim were "indubitable evidence of the fact that the first inhabitants of Malta were of the race of Giants".

Ħaġar Qim was first explored in 1839 at public expense during the Governorship of Henry Bouverie by J. G. Vance of the Royal Engineers. Within two short months, that officer had made a plan of the buildings and sent to Valletta a stone altar, a decorated slab and seven stone statuettes which are now exhibited in the Valletta Museum. The account of his excavations was published in 1842.

In 1885, Antonio Caruana made further excavations and published a lengthy report with elaborate plans, sections and views, drawn by Philip Vassallo of the Public Works Department.

Further excavations were carried out in 1909 by Themistocles Zammit and Thomas Peet. The British School at Rome directed subsequent excavations to ensure that all ruins in the Ħaġar Qim area had been identified.

Zammit was part of the Research Council selected by the First International Congress of Prehistoric and Protohistoric Science.

In 1910, the surrounding fields were carefully searched and the ruins themselves accurately surveyed by members of the British School at Rome who repaired some of the damaged structures and made a rich collection of potsherds, flint implements, stone and clay objects, now deposited in the Valletta Museum.

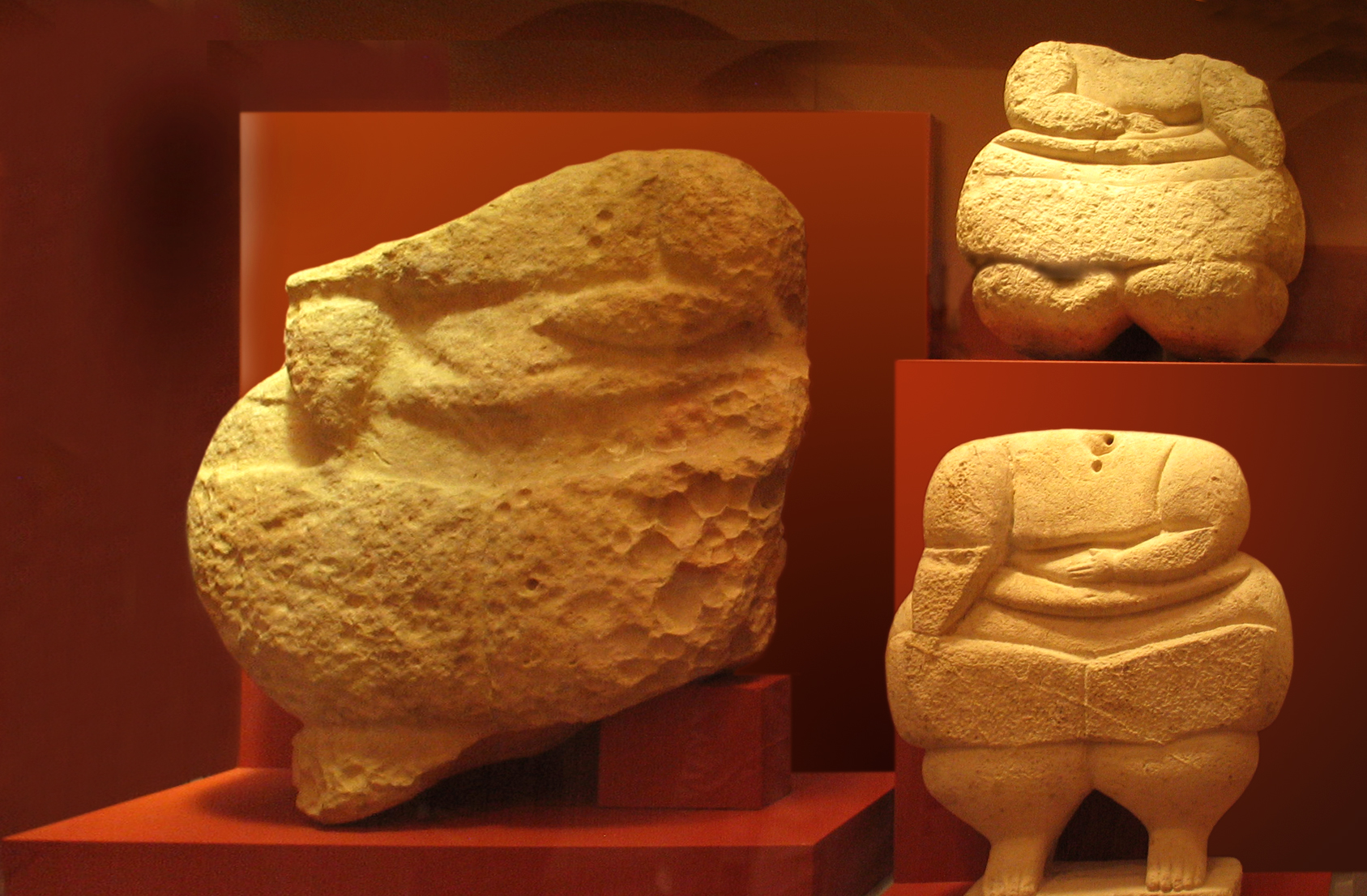
Examples of Maltese temple statuary

The temple was included on the Antiquities List of 1925.

On 17 September 1949, three statuettes and several pieces of a much larger stone statue were discovered buried beneath a rectangular stone. The "Venus of Malta", which shares similar characteristics with the Ħaġar Qim statuettes, was discovered on 31 March 1950. The absence of sexual characteristics on the more developed types of Maltese cult-statuettes may imply that the being represented is in fact asexual.

Little has been done to restore the temple with the exception of reinforcing or replacing several stones, including the lintel, in the 1950s. Shelters have been constructed by Heritage Malta in an attempt to shield the temples from further erosion. A visitors' centre has been built near the temple, over what was originally a small restaurant. The visitors’ centre includes an auditorium for an audio-visual introduction and an exhibition space, displaying related artifacts and reproductions from the Museum of Archaeology as well as interactive exhibits.

The new structures have been the focus of some controversy, after MEPA's reports that construction be limited to the Magħlaq quarry (in the vicinity of Mnajdra) and not beside the Ħaġar Qim temples, were found to be misleading.

== Gallery ==
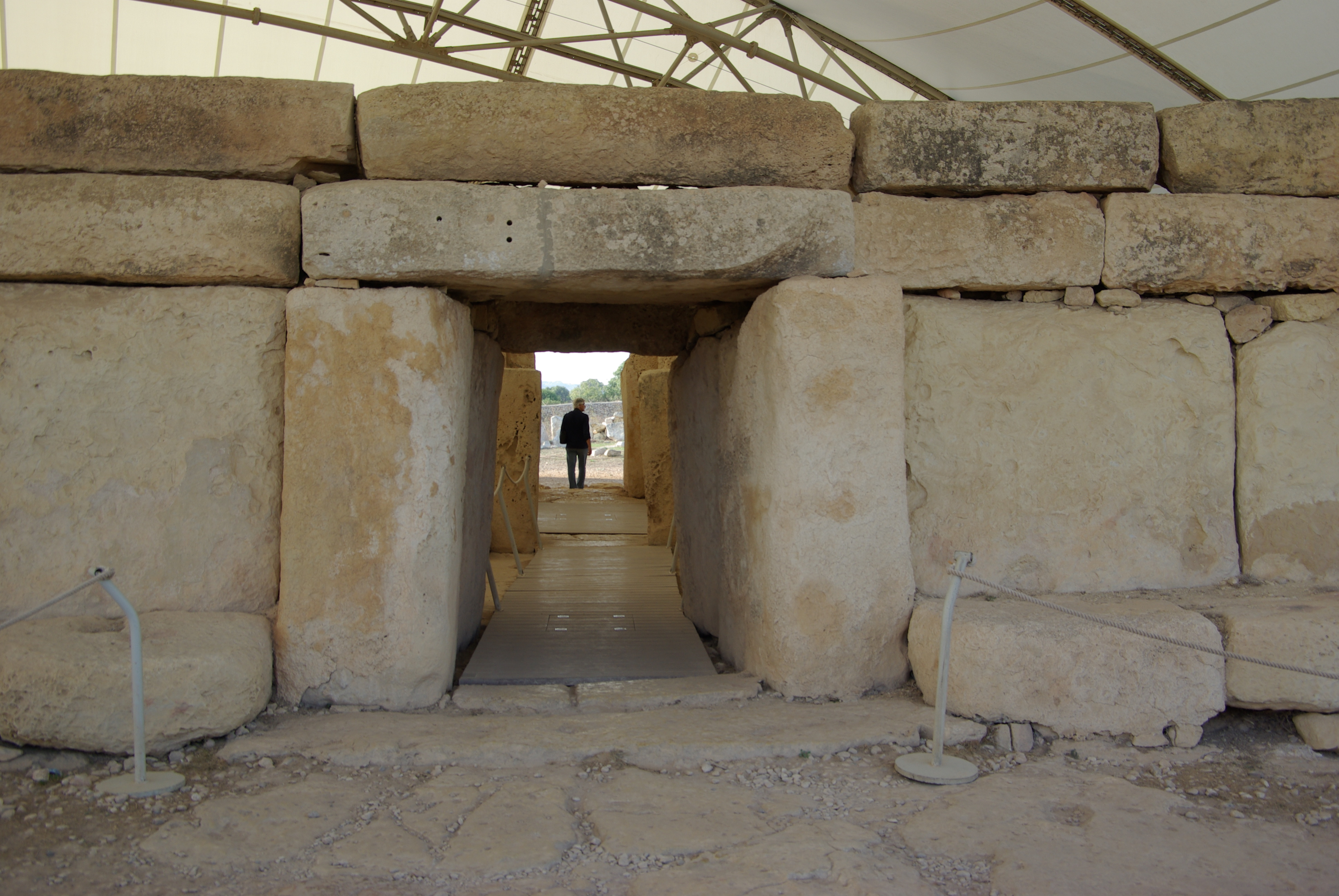
Entrance to the megalithic Temple

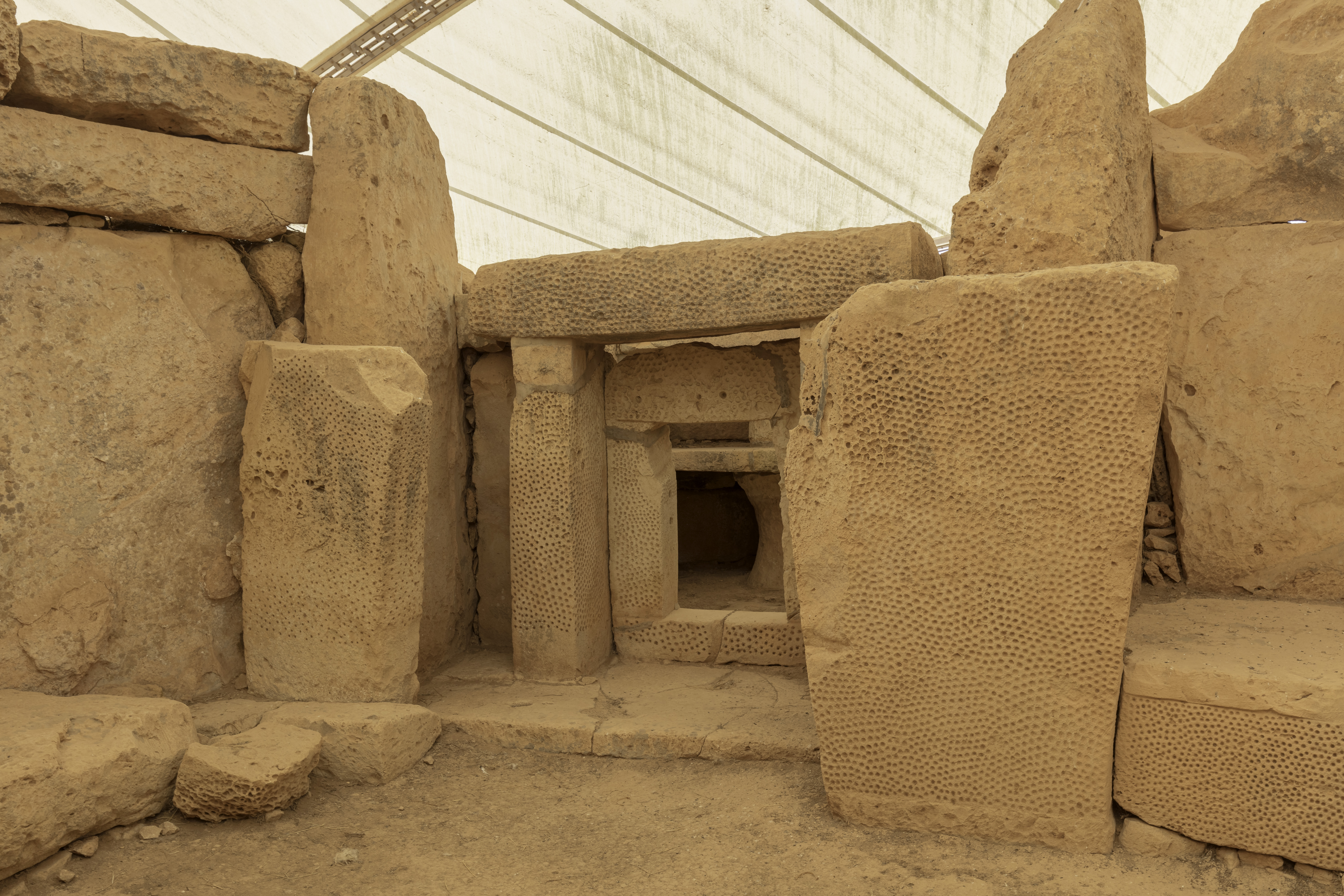
Temple decoration

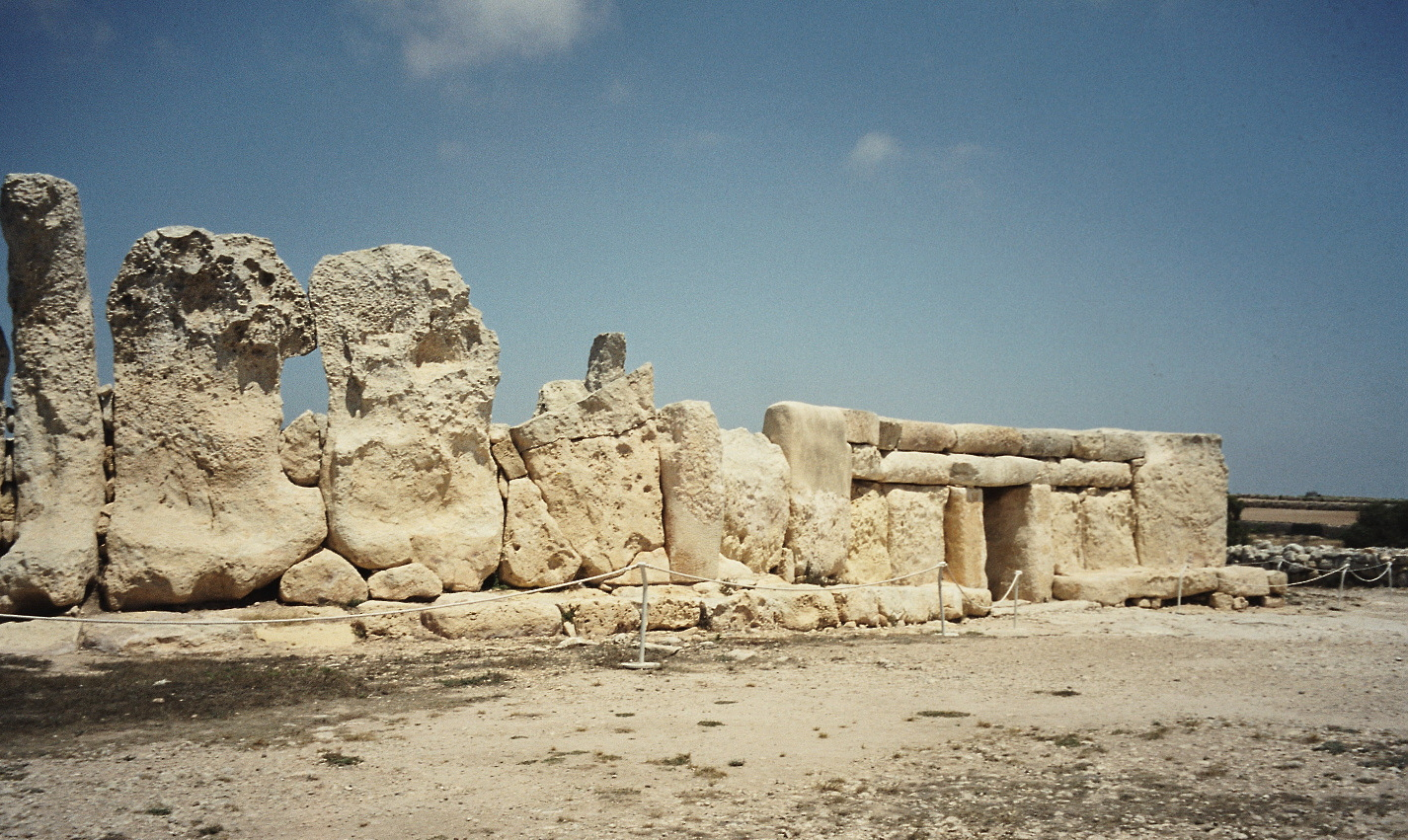
The southern wall of Ħaġar Qim

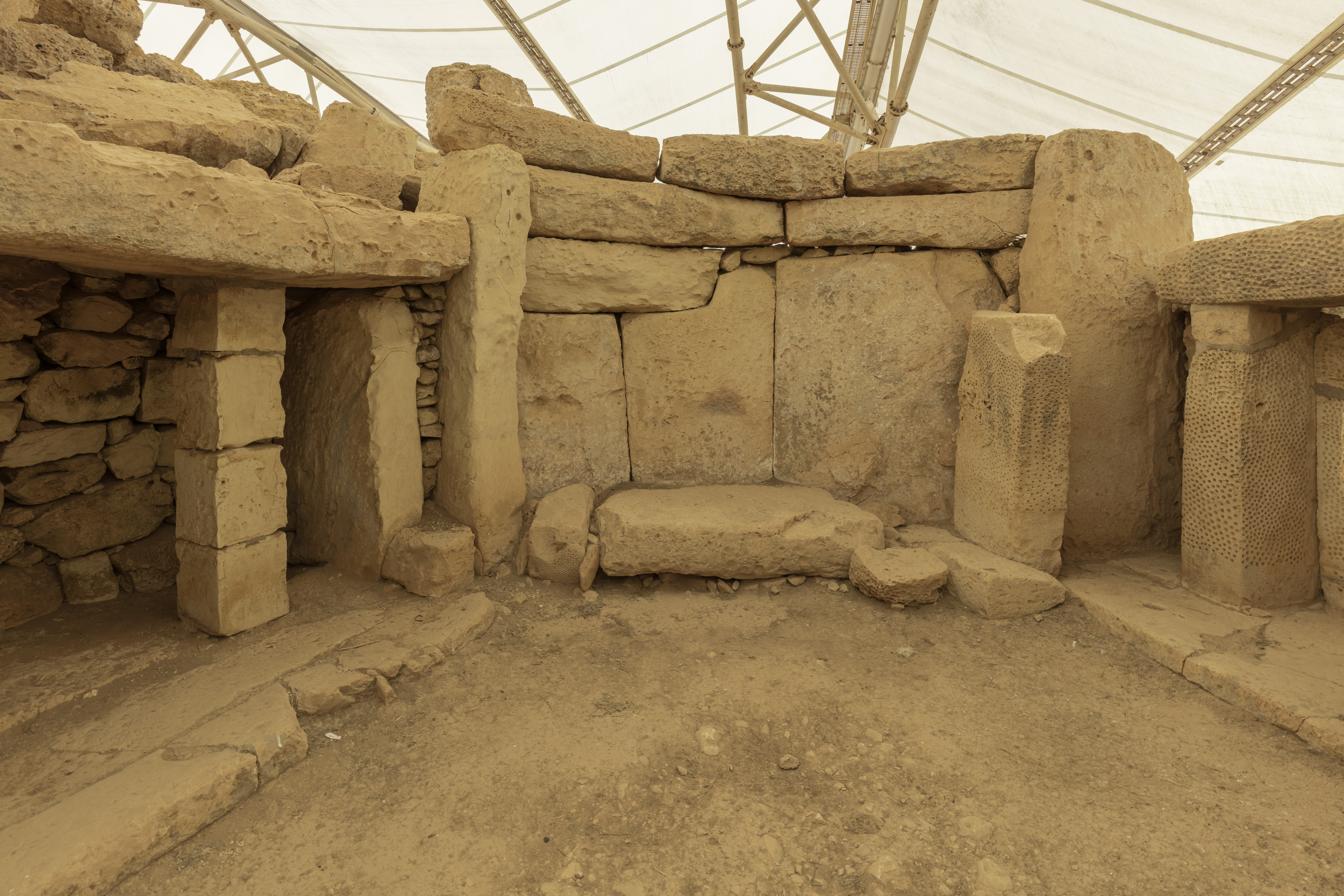
Semicircular chamber

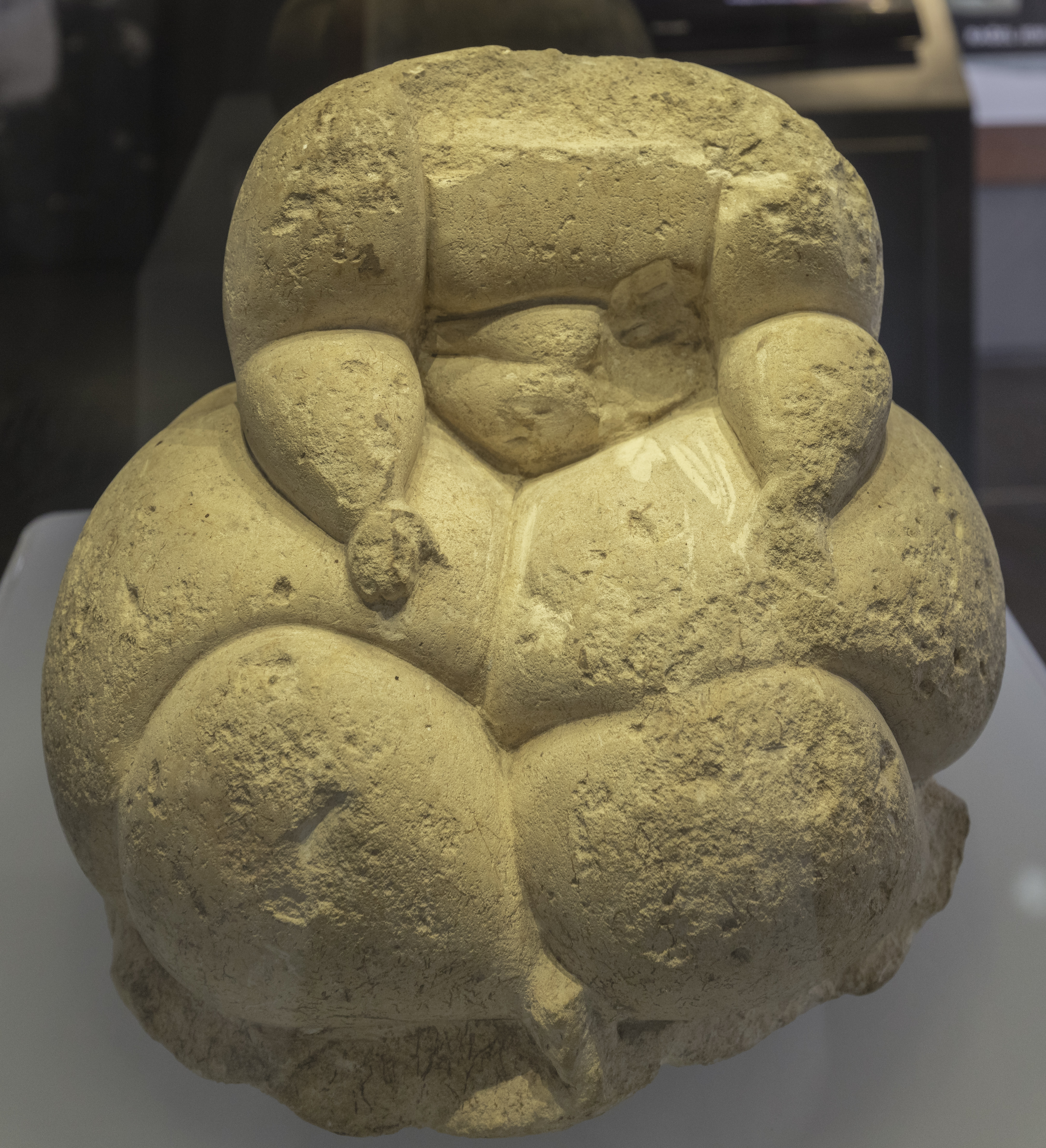
The Venus of Malta

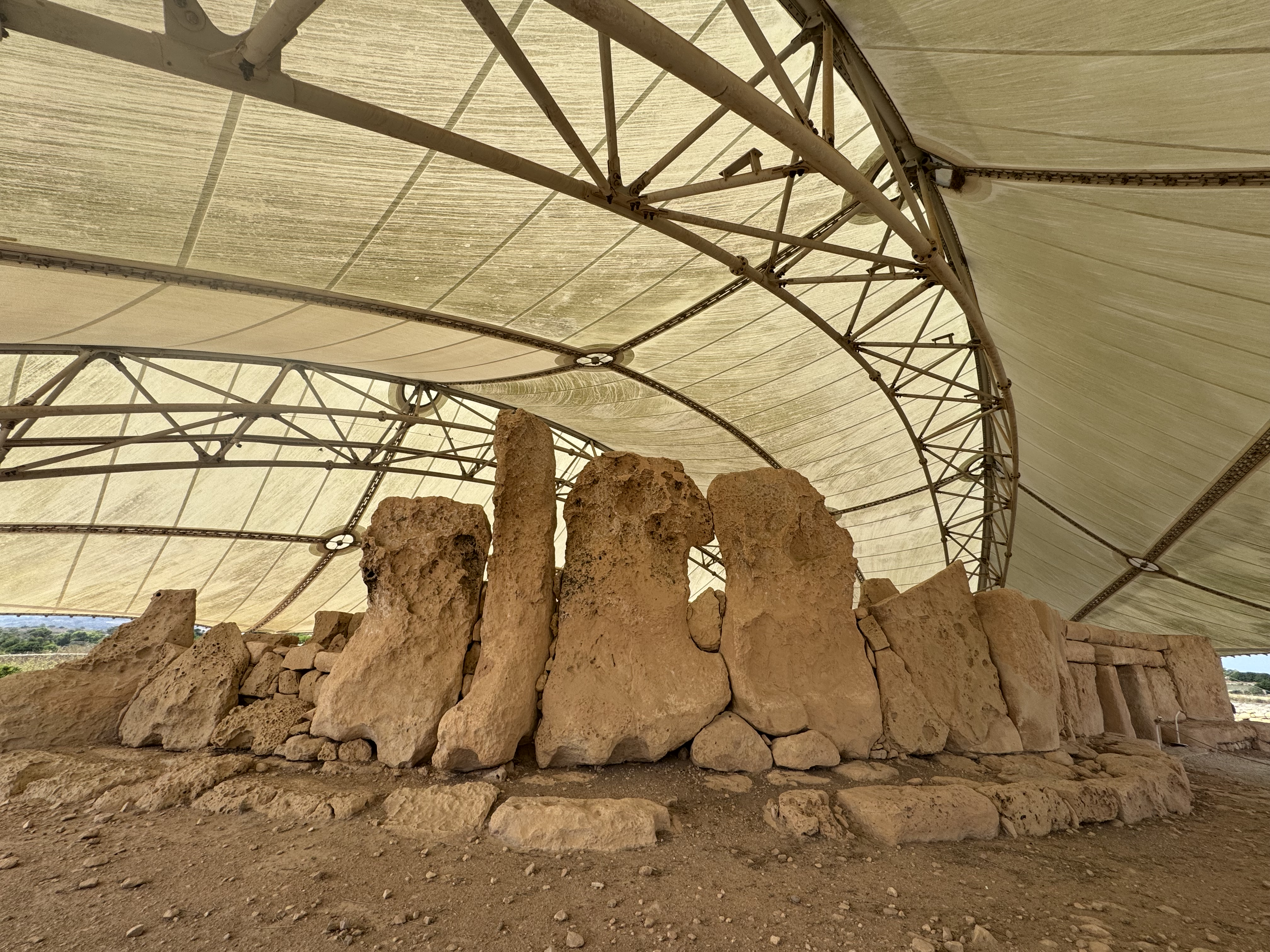
A protective shelder now covers the site

== See also ==
- Ġgantija
- Hypogeum of Ħal-Saflieni
- List of megalithic sites
- Megalithic Temples of Malta
- Mnajdra
- Tarxien Temples
