= List of State Archives of Italy =

The State Archives of Italy consists of numerous repositories located in the capital city of each of the provinces of Italy, along with several additional local sub-branches ("sezione"). It is overseen by a central office which is part of the Ministry of Culture in Rome. The following list is arranged by administrative region.

== List of State Archives by region ==
=== Abruzzo ===
- State Archives of Chieti
  - Lanciano Section
- State Archives of L'Aquila
  - Avezzano Section
  - Sulmona Section
- State Archives of Pescara
- State Archives of Teramo

=== Apulia ===
- State Archives of Bari
- State Archives of Barletta-Andria-Trani
- State Archives of Brindisi
- State Archives of Foggia
  - Lucera Section
- State Archives of Lecce
- State Archives of Taranto

=== Basilicata ===
- State Archives of Matera
- State Archives of Potenza

=== Calabria ===
- State Archives of Catanzaro
  - Lamezia Terme Section
- State Archives of Cosenza
  - Castrovillari Section
- State Archives of Crotone
- State Archives of Reggio Calabria
  - Locri Section
  - Palmi Section
- State Archives of Vibo Valentia

=== Campania ===
- State Archives of Avellino
- State Archives of Benevento
- State Archives of Caserta
- State Archives of Naples
- State Archives of Salerno

=== Emilia-Romagna ===
- State Archives of Bologna
  - Imola Section
- State Archives of Ferrara
- State Archives of Forlì-Cesena
- State Archives of Modena
- State Archives of Parma
- State Archives of Piacenza
- State Archives of Ravenna
  - Faenza Section
- State Archives of Reggio Emilia
- State Archives of Rimini

=== Friuli-Venezia Giulia ===
- State Archives of Gorizia
- State Archives of Pordenone
- State Archives of Trieste
- State Archives of Udine

=== Lazio ===
- State Archives of Frosinone
  - Anagni-Guarcino Section
- State Archives of Latina
- State Archives of Rieti
- State Archives of Rome
- State Archives of Viterbo

=== Liguria ===
- State Archives of Genoa
- State Archives of Imperia
  - Sanremo Section
  - Ventimiglia Section
- State Archives of La Spezia
- State Archives of Savona

=== Lombardy ===
- State Archives of Bergamo
- State Archives of Brescia
- State Archives of Como
- State Archives of Cremona
- State Archives of Mantua. Directors have included Antonino Bertolotti (1881-1893) and Alessandro Luzio (1899–1918).
- State Archives of Milan
- State Archives of Pavia
- State Archives of Sondrio
- State Archives of Varese

=== Marche ===
- State Archives of Ancona
  - Fabriano Section
- State Archives of Ascoli Piceno
- State Archives of Fermo
- State Archives of Macerata
  - Camerino Section
- State Archives of Pesaro
  - Fano Section
  - Urbino Section

=== Molise ===
- State Archives of Campobasso
- State Archives of Isernia

=== Piedmont ===
- State Archives of Alessandria
- State Archives of Asti
- State Archives of Biella
- State Archives of Cuneo
- State Archives of Novara
- State Archives of Turin. Directors have included Alessandro Luzio (1918–1931).
- State Archives of Verbania
- State Archives of Vercelli
  - Varallo Section

=== Sardinia ===
- State Archives of Cagliari
- State Archives of Nuoro
- State Archives of Oristano
- State Archives of Sassari

=== Sicily ===
- State Archives of Agrigento
  - Sciacca Section
- State Archives of Caltanissetta
- State Archives of Catania
  - Caltagirone Section
- State Archives of Enna
- State Archives of Messina
- State Archives of Palermo
  - Termini Imerese Section
- State Archives of Ragusa
  - Modica Section
- State Archives of Syracuse
  - Noto Section
- State Archives of Trapani

=== Trentino-Alto Adige ===
- State Archives of Bolzano
- State Archives of Trento

=== Tuscany ===
- State Archives of Arezzo
- State Archives of Florence
- State Archives of Grosseto
- State Archives of Livorno
- State Archives of Lucca
- State Archives of Massa
  - Pontremoli Section
- State Archives of Pisa
- State Archives of Pistoia
  - Pescia Section
- State Archives of Prato
- State Archives of Siena

=== Umbria ===
- State Archives of Perugia
  - Assisi Section
  - Foligno Section
  - Gubbio Section
  - Spoleto Section
- State Archives of Terni
  - Orvieto Section

=== Veneto ===
- State Archives of Belluno
- State Archives of Padua
- State Archives of Rovigo
- State Archives of Treviso
- State Archives of Venice
- State Archives of Verona
- State Archives of Vicenza
  - Bassano del Grappa Section

== See also ==
- Italian State Archives, which oversees archival heritage around the country
- Central Archives of the State (Italy), which preserves documentation related to the central offices of the nation of Italy
- Ministry of Cultural Heritage and Activities and Tourism (Italy)
- List of archives in Italy

== Bibliography ==
- Napoleone Vazio (1883), Relazione sugli archivi di stato italiani (1874-1882) (in Italian), OCLC 9818183
- Pagliani, Stefano (1889), "Archivi", Nuova Enciclopedia Italiana (in Italian), vol. Supplemento: 1 (6th ed.), pp. 842–846
- Crump, Charles George (1911). "Record" . In Chisholm, Hugh (ed.). Encyclopædia Britannica. Vol. 22 (11th ed.). Cambridge University Press. pp. 958–966, see page 965. "Italy.—The administration of the public records of the kingdom is attached to the Ministry of the Interior, for which office Signor Vazio published (1883) his Relazione sugli archivi di stato italiani. There are seventeen repositories,"
- Rassegna degli Archivi di Stato (in Italian), ISSN 0037-2781
- Paul Oskar Kristeller. Iter Italicum: a finding list of uncatalogued or incompletely catalogued humanistic manuscripts of the Renaissance in Italian and other libraries. Vol. 1-2: Italy. Brill. ISBN 9004069259. 1963-1997. v.1
- Angelo Giogio Ghezzi, ed. (2005). L'Archivio: teoria, funzione, gestione e legislazione (in Italian). Milan: Università Cattolica del Sacro Cuore. ISBN 978-88-8311-351-2. (includes information about the State Archives)

== Images ==
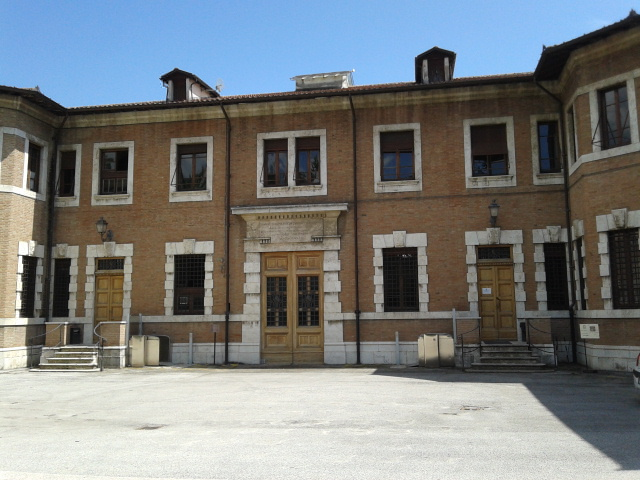
Avezzano State Archives (photo 2016)

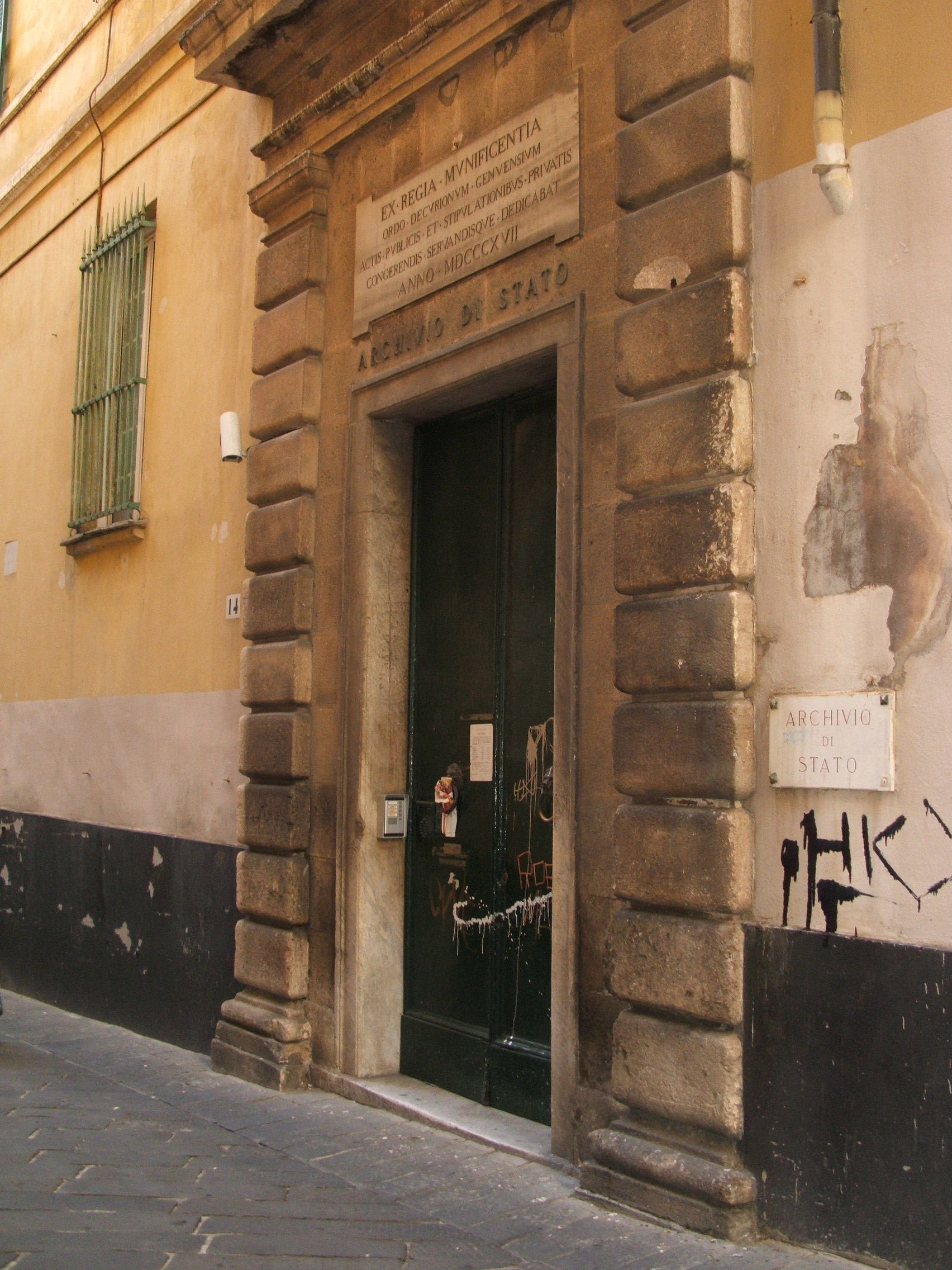
Genoa State Archives (photo 2006)

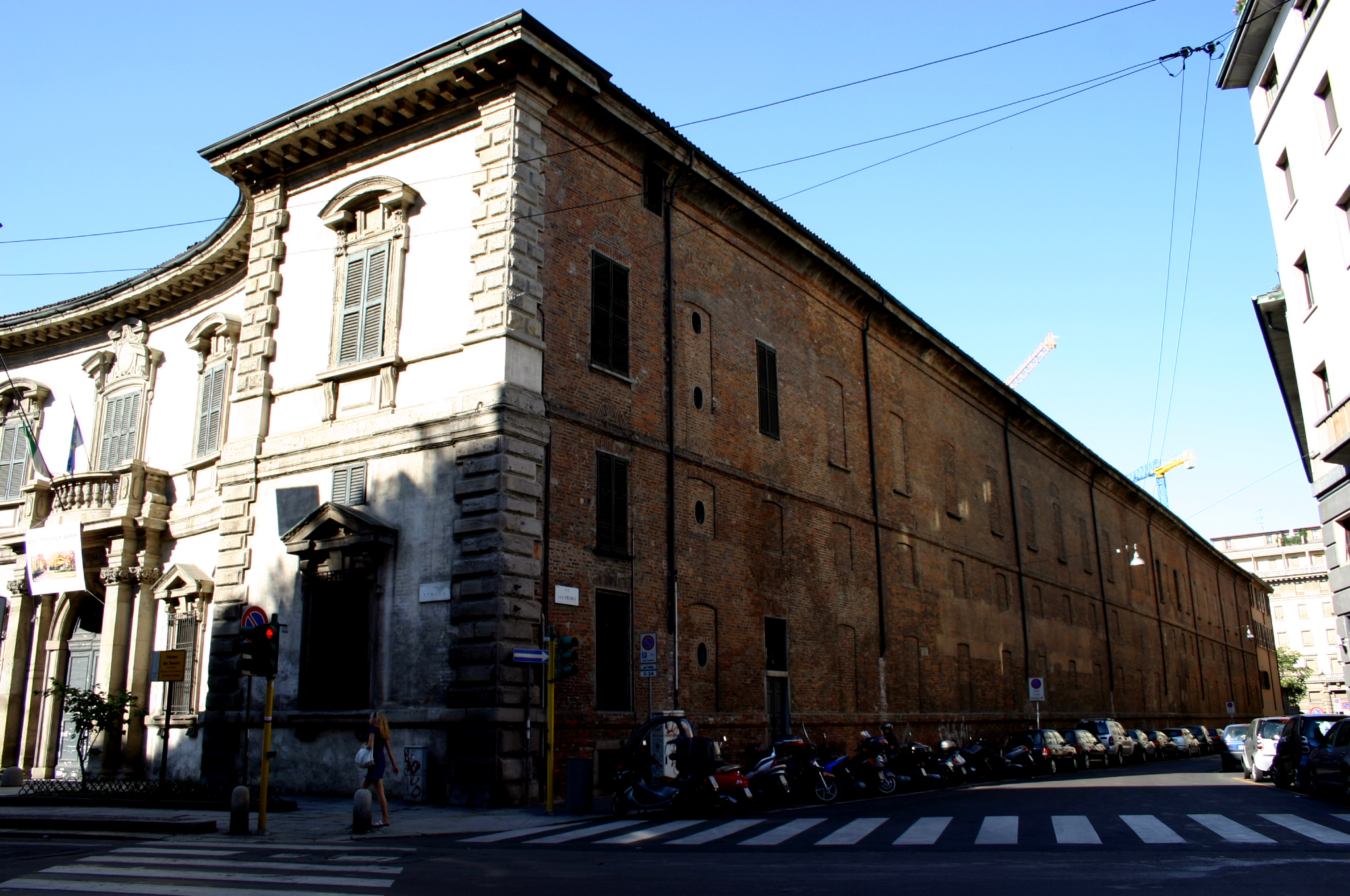
Milan State Archives in the Palazzo del Senato (photo 2007)

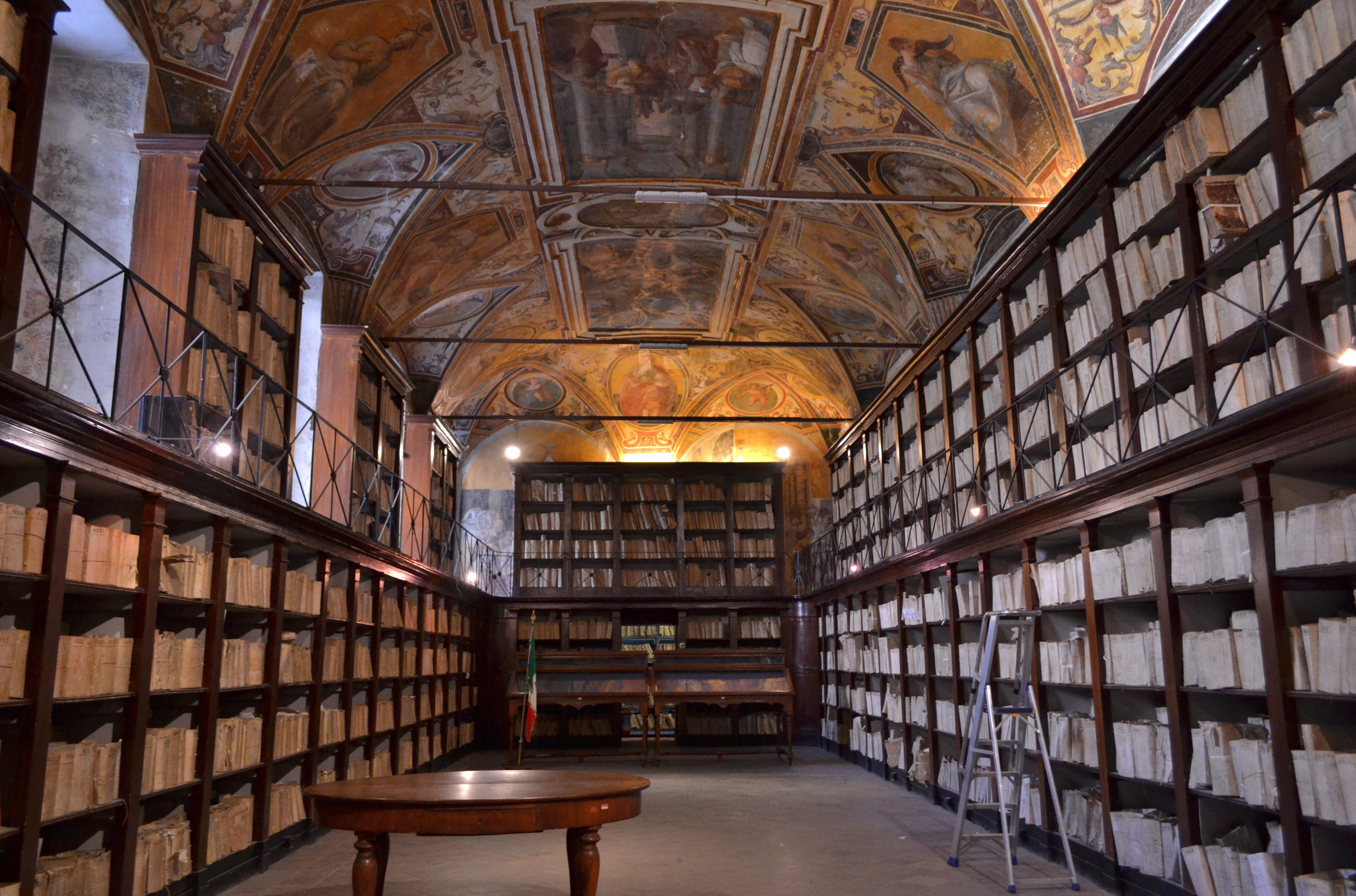
Naples State Archives in the Santi Severino e Sossio (photo 2015)

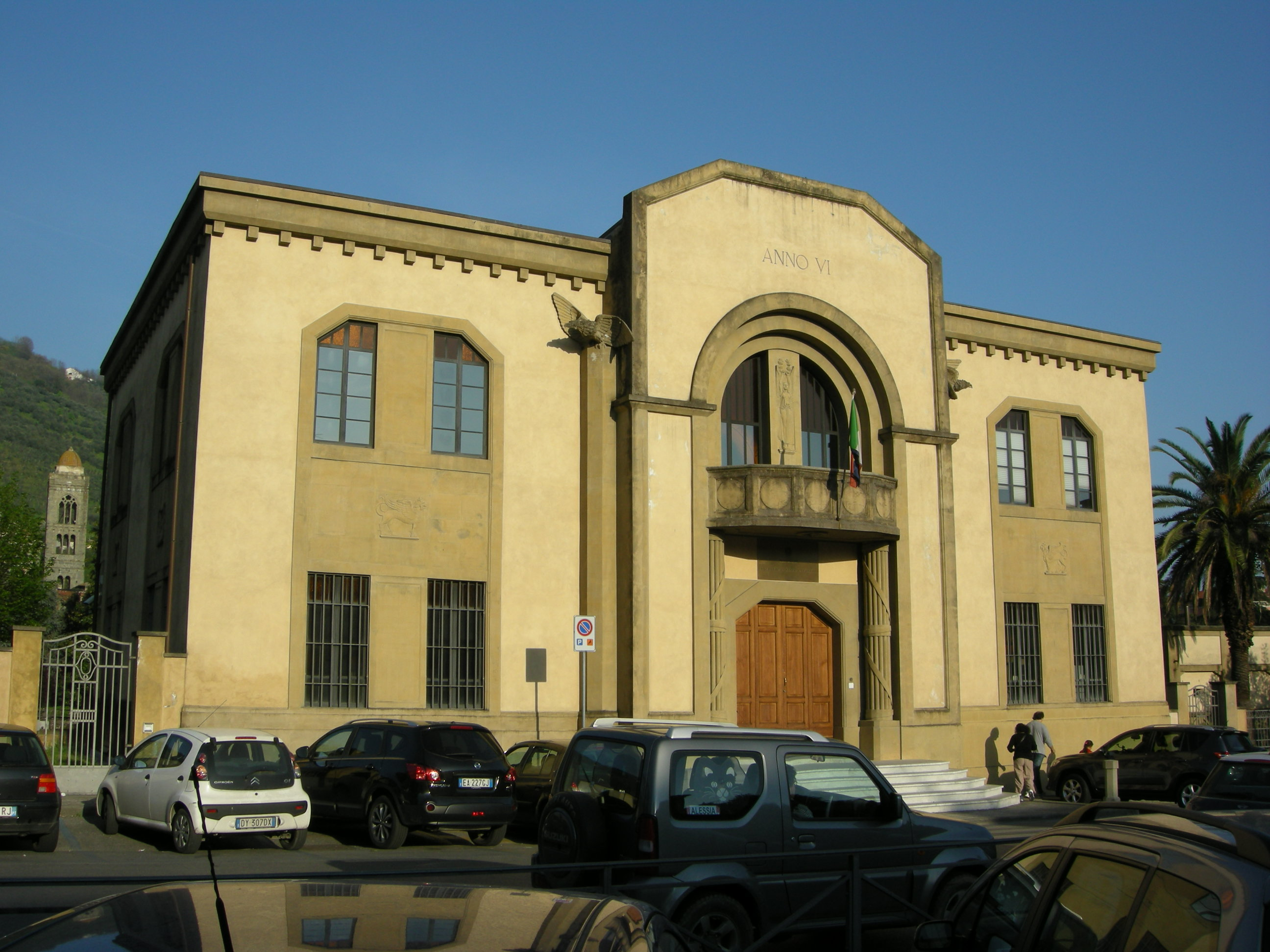
Pescia State Archives (photo 2011)

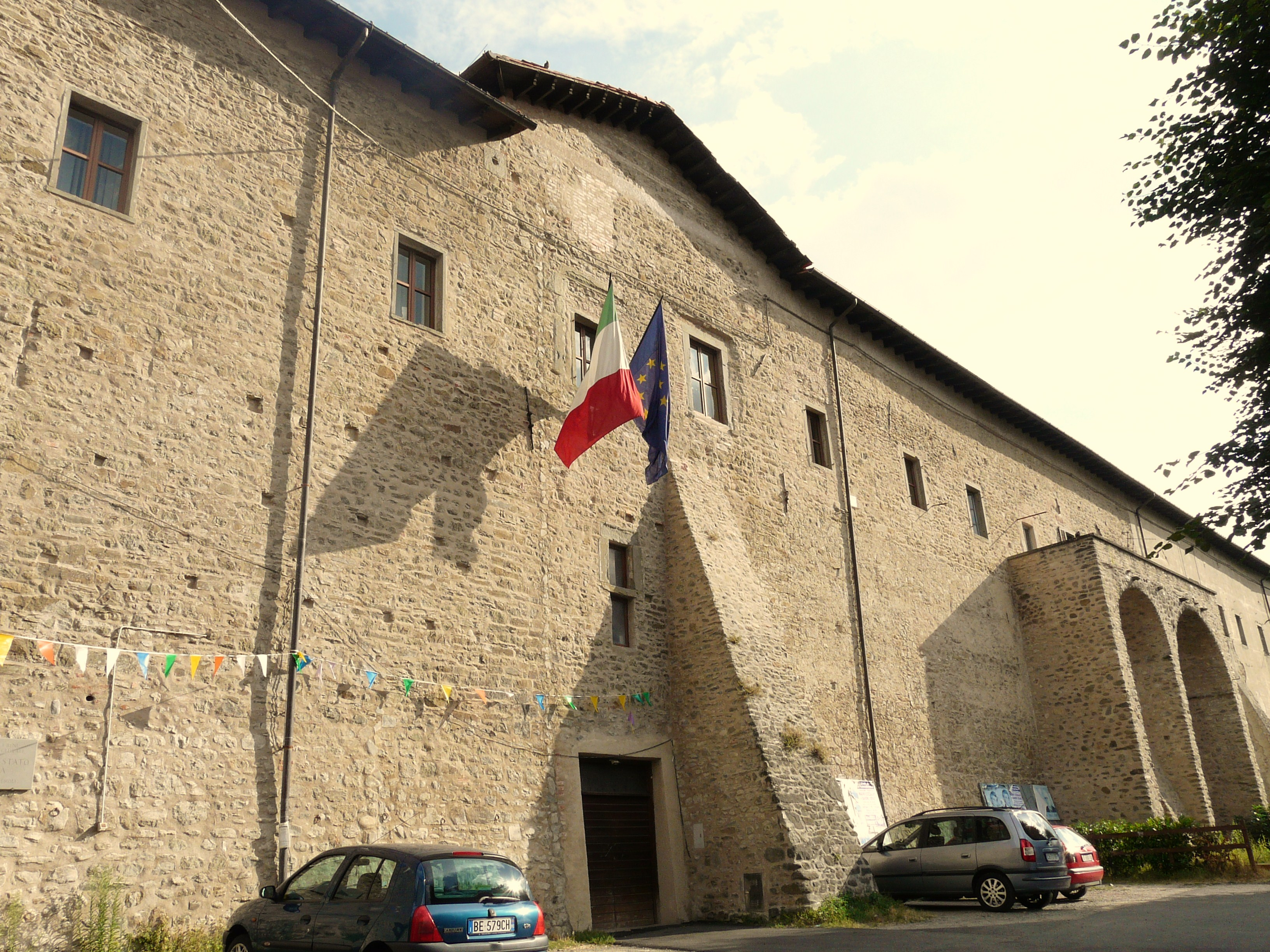
Pontremoli State Archives (photo 2008)

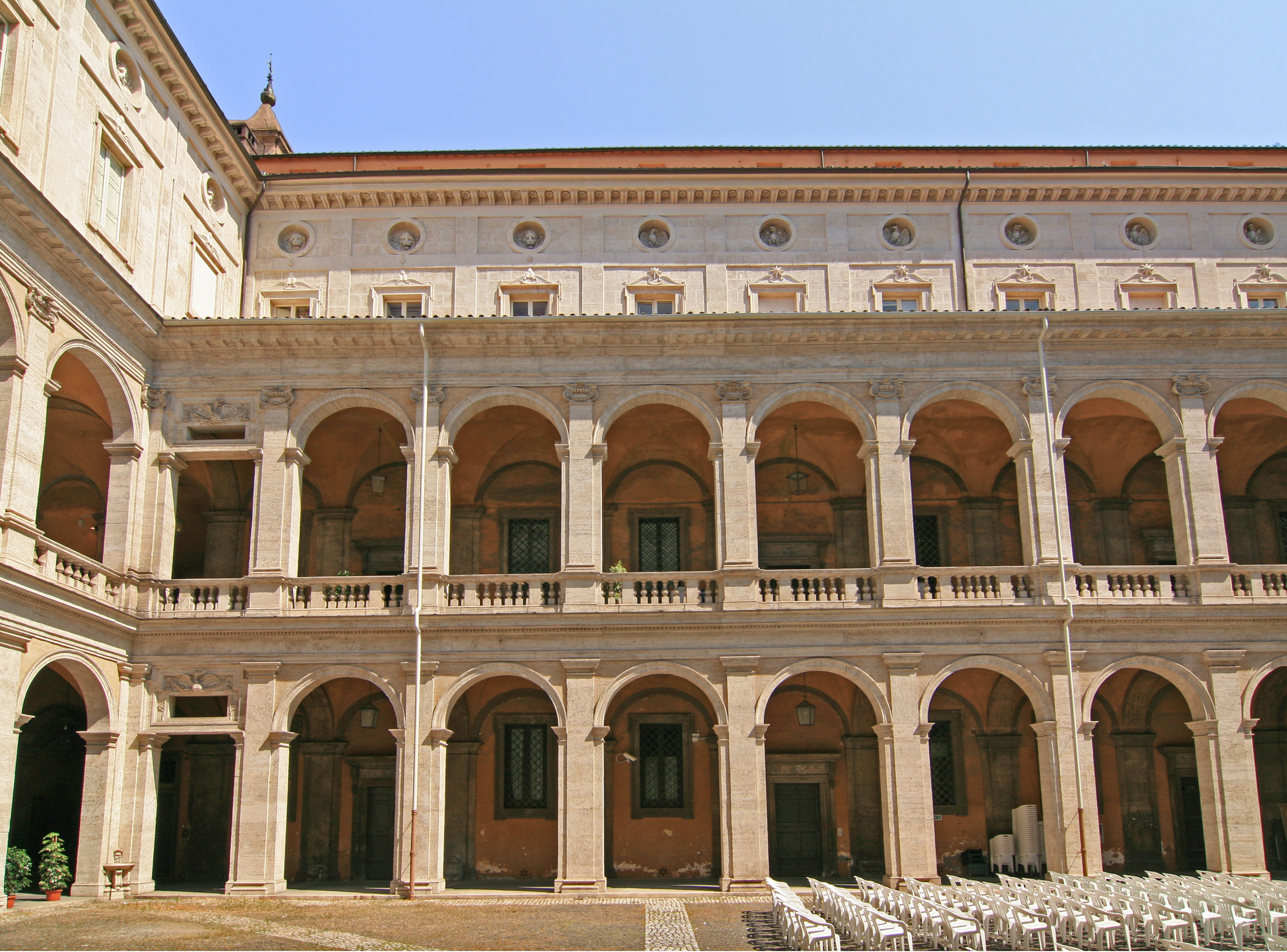
Rome State Archives in the Palazzo della Sapienza (photo 2008)

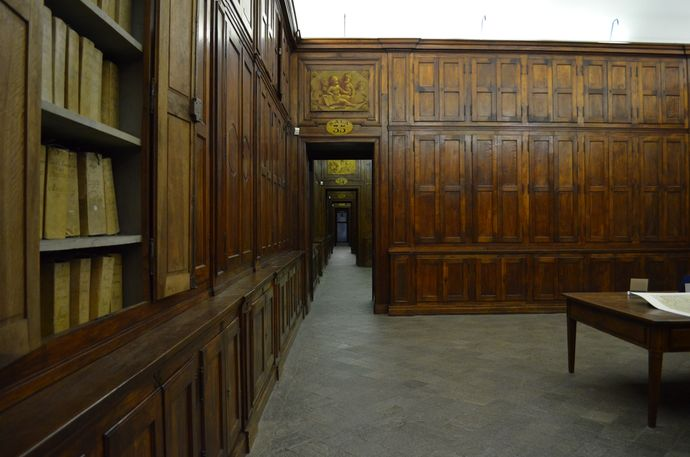
Saloni juvarriani, Turin State Archives (photo 2013)

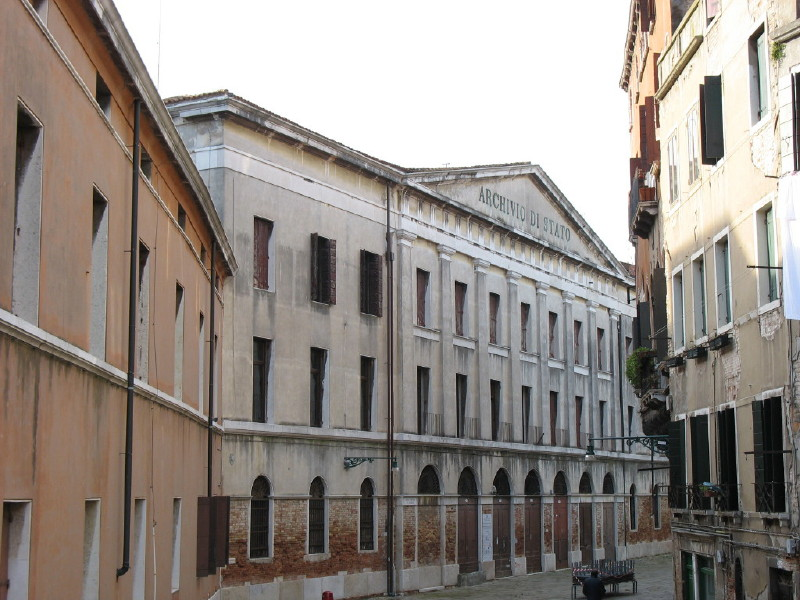
Venice State Archives (photo 2008)
