= State Archives of Fermo =

State archival institution in Fermo, Italy

- Interactive map of State Archives of Fermo
- 43°09′38″N 13°43′08″E
- Location: Fermo, Marche, Italy
- Type: State archive
- Website: https://archiviodistatofermo.cultura.gov.it/home

The State Archives of Fermo (Italian: Archivio di Stato di Fermo) is a state archival institution in Fermo, in the Marche region of Italy. It preserves historical records produced by the peripheral offices of the Italian state in the province of Fermo and other archival collections of historical significance.

The archive originated as a Section of the State Archives of Ascoli Piceno, established by ministerial decree on 10 July 1965. After the creation of the province of Fermo in 2004, it was elevated to an autonomous State Archives on 28 December 2007.

The holdings include municipal archives of Fermo, notarial archives from Fermo, Sant'Elpidio a Mare, and Montegiorgio, the archives of the Prefecture of the Tronto department (1808–1816), the Apostolic Delegation (1817–1860), and the Subprefecture of Fermo (1860–1926). Catastals from the pre-Napoleonic, Napoleonic, and post-unitary periods, along with archives of prominent families are also preserved.

== Sources ==
- "Sezione di Archivio di Stato di Fermo". Guida generale degli Archivi di Stato italiani. Vol. I (A–E). Rome: Ministero per i beni culturali e ambientali. 1981. pp. 408–428.
- Lodolini, Elio (1959). "Problemi e soluzioni per la creazione di un Archivio di Stato (Ascoli Piceno)". Rassegna degli Archivi di Stato. 19 (2). Rome: 197–273.
- "Archivio di Stato di Fermo". Sistema informativo degli Archivi di Stato. Ministero della cultura.

== See also ==
- List of State Archives of Italy
