= State Archives of Ancona =

State archival institution in Ancona, Italy

- Interactive map of State Archives of Ancona
- 43°35′52″N 13°30′13″E
- Location: Ancona, Marche, Italy
- Type: State archive
- Website: https://archiviodistatoancona.cultura.gov.it/home

The State Archives of Ancona (Italian: Archivio di Stato di Ancona) is a state archival institution located in Ancona, in the Marche region of Italy. It preserves historical records produced by the peripheral offices of the Italian state in the province of Ancona and other archival collections of historical interest.

Its origins date back to the period following the unification of Italy, when records of earlier administrations—such as those of the Apostolic Delegation, the Napoleonic Kingdom of Italy, provisional governments, and suppressed religious corporations—were gathered in Ancona. These materials later formed the core of the Provincial Archives established in 1919.

A further step occurred with the creation of a Section of the State Archives by ministerial decree on 18 May 1941, which began operating in 1942 using the same collections. The present State Archives of Ancona were formally established in 1963.

== Sources ==
- "Archivio di Stato di Ancona" (PDF). Guida generale degli Archivi di Stato italiani. Vol. I. Rome: Ministero per i beni culturali e ambientali. 1983. pp. 333–357.

== See also ==
- List of State Archives of Italy
