= State Archives of Barletta-Andria-Trani =

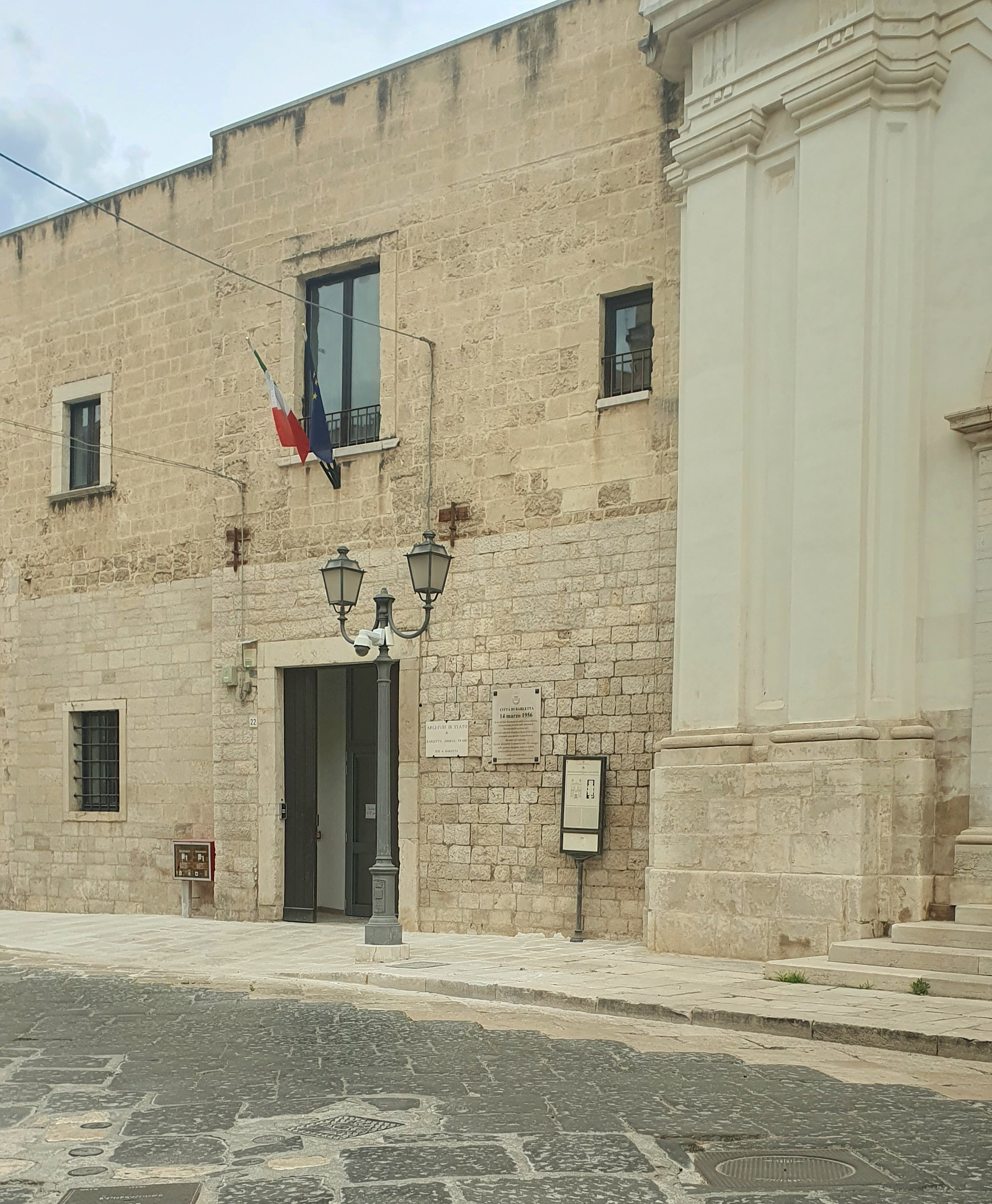
- Barletta branch
- Interactive map of State Archives of Barletta-Andria-Trani
- 41°19′18″N 16°16′39″E
- Location: Barletta and Trani, Apulia, Italy
- Type: State archive
- Established: 28 March 2025
- Website: https://archiviodistatobat.cultura.gov.it/

The State Archives of Barletta-Andria-Trani (Italian: Archivio di Stato di Barletta-Andria-Trani) is the state archival institution responsible for preserving public records relating to the province of Barletta-Andria-Trani, in Apulia, Italy. It forms part of the national network of Italian state archives administered by the Ministry of Culture. The State Archives operates from two locations, in Barletta and Trani.

== History ==
The State Archives was established by Ministerial Decree no. 89 of 28 March 2025, which unified the archival sections previously operating in Trani and Barletta, both formerly dependent on the State Archives of Bari.

The archival institution in Trani dates back to 1856, when a royal decree of Ferdinand II of the Two Sicilies established an archive for the tribunal and the notarial chamber in Palazzo Valenzano, an 18th-century building constructed in 1762 by the merchant Andrea Valenzano. The institute later became a supplementary archive to the Provincial State Archives of Bari in 1932 and was designated a Section of the State Archives in 1965.

The Barletta Section was established in 1973 to house the archival and historical records of the former Barletta district (circondario) and the local military district. On 31 March 2025, a new seat for the archives was inaugurated in Barletta in the former convent of San Giovanni di Dio, a medieval complex whose origins date back to the twelfth century and which was later used as the Stennio barracks before being restored for archival purposes.
