= State Archives of Cagliari =

State archival institution in Cagliari, Italy

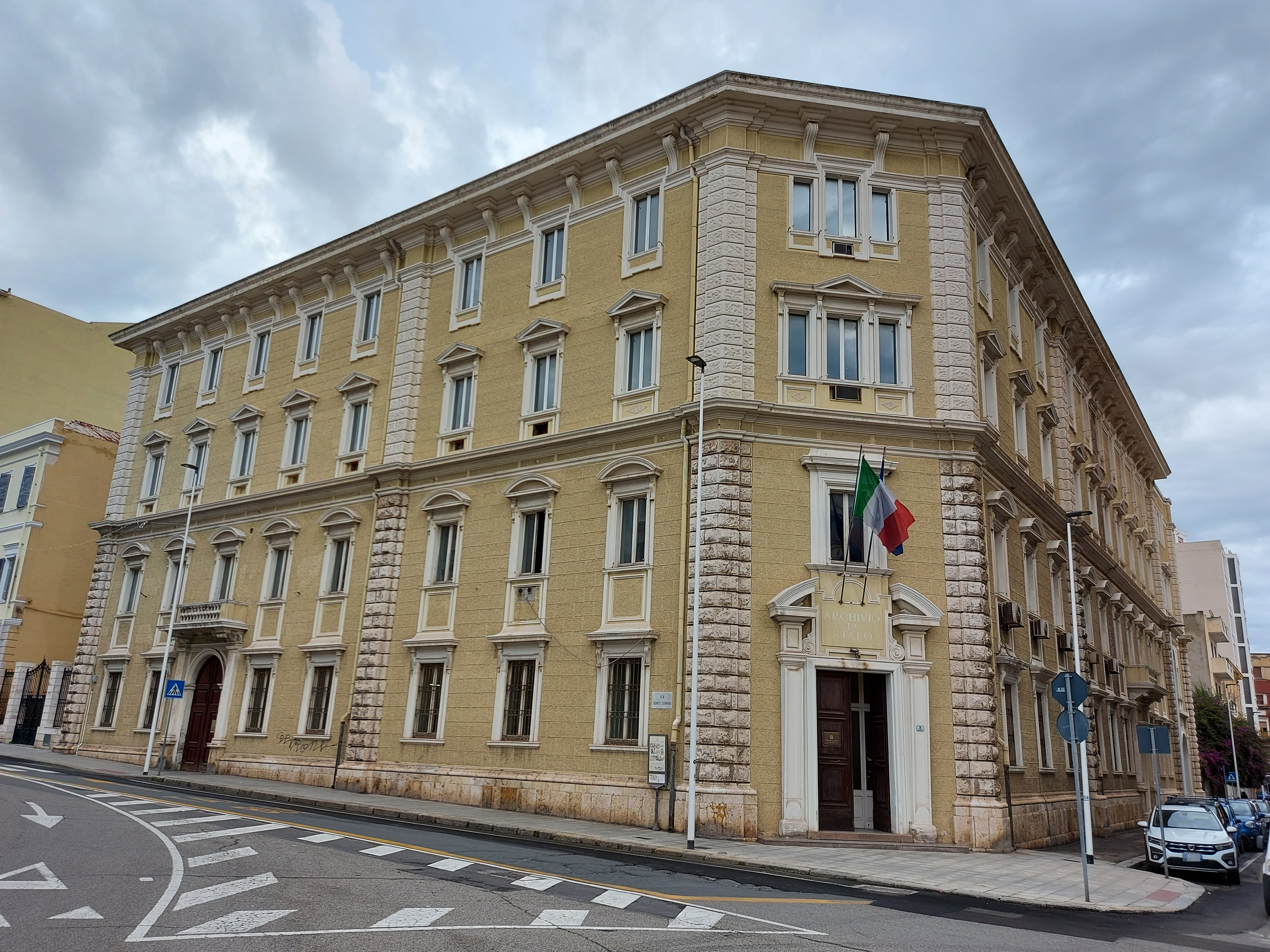
- Interactive map of State Archives of Cagliari
- 39°12′49″N 9°07′11″E
- Location: Cagliari, Sardinia, Italy
- Type: State archive
- Website: Official website

The State Archives of Cagliari (Italian: Archivio di Stato di Cagliari) is a public archival institution located in Cagliari, Sardinia, Italy. It preserves historical records produced by governmental, judicial, and administrative institutions operating in Sardinia across several centuries. The archive reflects the political and institutional history of the island, which served for long periods as the capital of the Kingdom of Sardinia under Catalan-Aragonese, Spanish, Austrian, and Savoyard rule before the unification of Italy.

The institution was established in 1332 by Alfonso IV of Aragon, nine years after the Aragonese landing in Sardinia in 1323. Originally located in the Castello district of Cagliari, it functioned as the general archive of the Kingdom of Sardinia, preserving documents produced by the Aragonese administration. In 1618 Philip III of Spain explicitly defined the royal archive as patrimonial.

Following the Austrian occupation of Sardinia (1708–1717) during the War of the Spanish Succession, the Kingdom of Sardinia was transferred the to Victor Amadeus II of Savoy, who maintained the island's institutions. By royal decree of 10 September 1763, Charles Emmanuel III reorganized the archive as the central and general archive of the island.

The royal decree of 20 December 1847 transformed the archive from a general state archive into a provincial one. After the unification of Italy, Royal Decree no. 1852 of 5 March 1874 placed the institution under the Ministry of the Interior as one of the State Archives with provincial jurisdiction. Since 1975, the State Archives of Cagliari has been a peripheral office of the Italian Ministry of Culture.

== Sources ==
- Catani, Giuseppina, ed. (2001). Archivio di Stato di Cagliari. Viterbo: BetaGamma.
- "Archivio di Stato di Cagliari". Sistema Archivistico Nazionale. Ministero della cultura.
