= State Archives of Brescia =

State archival institution in Brescia, Italy

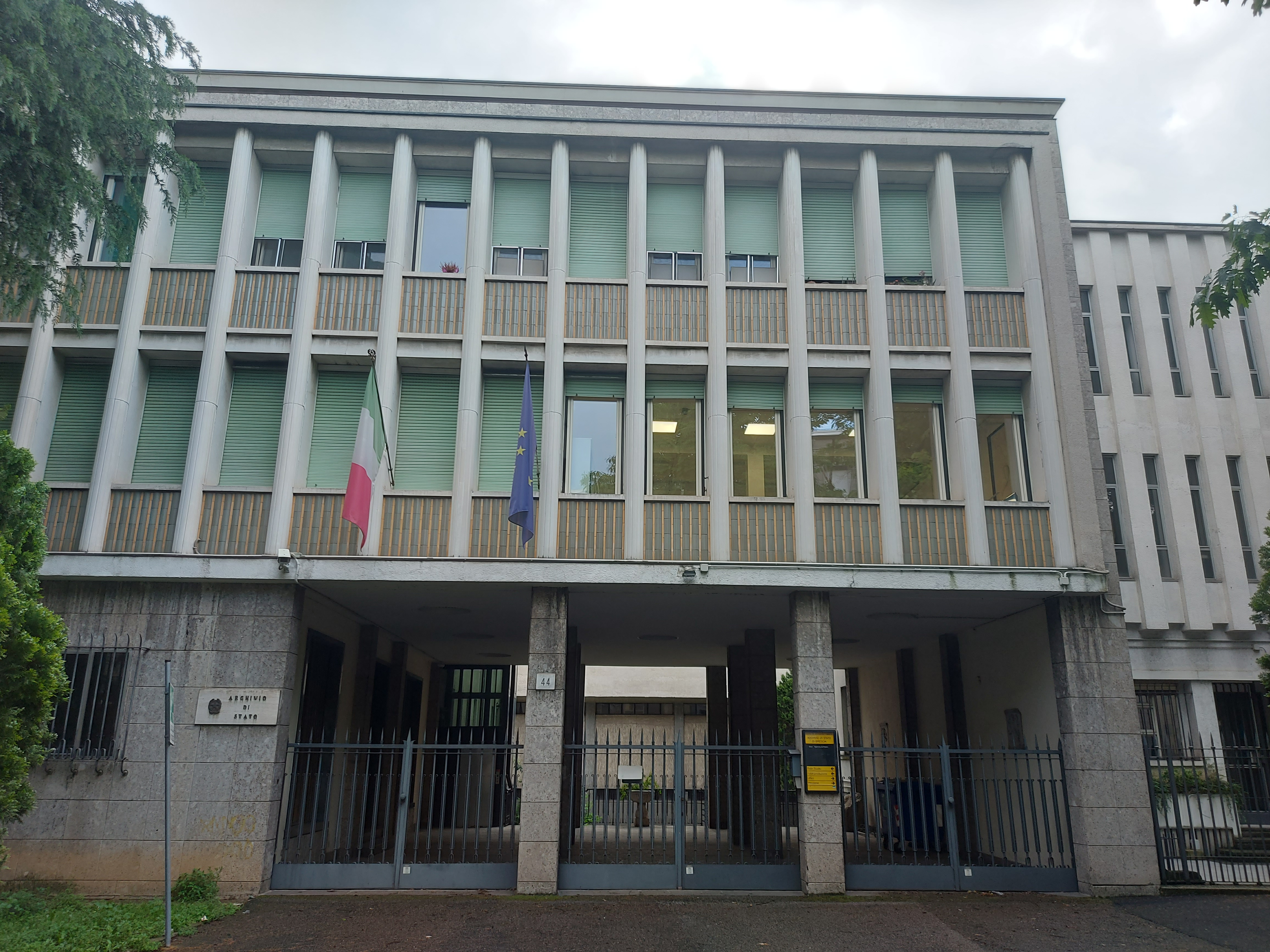
- Interactive map of State Archives of Brescia
- 45°32′53″N 10°13′38″E
- Location: Brescia, Lombardy, Italy
- Type: State archive

Building information
- Architect: Renzo Beretta, Gino Casnighi
- Construction date: 1954–1960
- Website: http://www.archiviodistatobrescia.beniculturali.it

The State Archives of Brescia (Italian: Archivio di Stato di Brescia) is the state archival institution in Brescia, Lombardy, Italy. It preserves historical records produced by public offices and institutions in the province of Brescia as part of the national archival network administered by the Ministry of Culture.

== History ==
In 1839 a governmental and judicial records repository (Archivio generale di deposito governativo-giudiziario) was established in Brescia under the authority of the General Directorate of Government Deposit Archives of Lombardy.

The institution assumed the name State Archives of Brescia in 1871, when the archival administration of the Kingdom of Italy was organized under the Ministry of the Interior.

The current headquarters, designed specifically as an archival building by the architect Renzo Beretta and the engineer Gino Casnighi, was inaugurated on 9 October 1960 under the director Carlo Paganini.

== Sources ==
- "Archivio di Stato di Brescia" (PDF). Guida generale degli Archivi di Stato italiani. Vol. I. Rome: Ministero per i beni culturali e ambientali. 1981. pp. 679–712.
- "Archivio di Stato di Brescia". Sistema informativo degli Archivi di Stato (in Italian). Istituto centrale per gli archivi.
