= State Archives of Udine =

State archival institution in Udine, Italy

- Interactive map of State Archives of Udine
- 46°04′06″N 13°13′23″E
- Location: Udine, Friuli-Venezia Giulia, Italy
- Type: State archive
- Established: 28 February 1941
- Website: http://www.archiviodistatoudine.beniculturali.it

The State Archives of Udine (Italian: Archivio di Stato di Udine) is the state archival institution in Udine, Friuli-Venezia Giulia, Italy. It preserves historical records produced by public offices and institutions in the province of Udine as part of the national archival network administered by the Ministry of Culture.

The institution was established by ministerial decree on 28 February 1941.

== Sources ==
- "Archivio di Stato di Udine" (PDF). Guida generale degli Archivi di Stato italiani. Vol. IV. Rome: Ministero per i beni culturali e ambientali. 1994. pp. 799–838.
- "Archivio di Stato di Udine". Sistema informativo degli Archivi di Stato (in Italian). Istituto centrale per gli archivi.
