= State Archives of Salerno =

State archival institution in Salerno, Italy

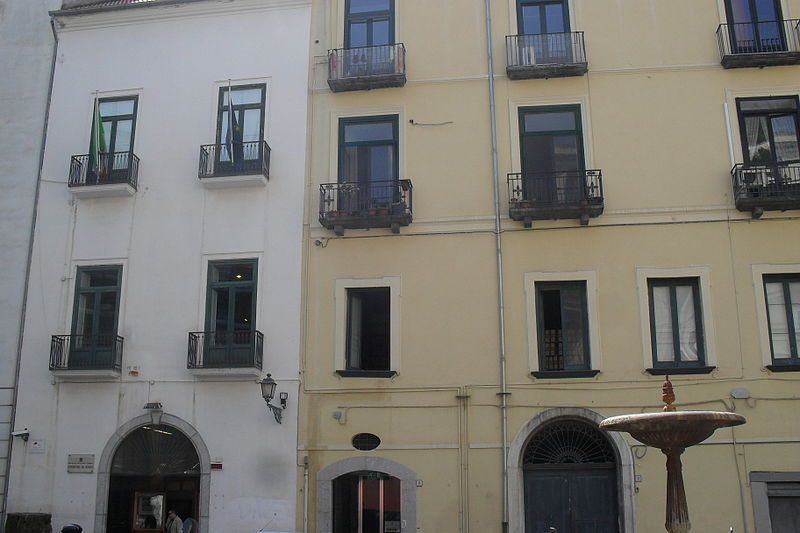
- Interactive map of State Archives of Salerno
- 40°40′51″N 14°45′30″E
- Location: Salerno, Campania, Italy
- Type: State archive
- Established: 1812
- Director: Salvatore Amato
- Website: http://www.archiviodistatosalerno.beniculturali.it

The State Archives of Salerno (Italian: Archivio di Stato di Salerno) is a public archival institution located in Salerno, Italy. It preserves historical records produced by governmental and administrative institutions that operated in the province of Salerno and forms part of the national archival network administered by the Italian Ministry of Culture.

The archive preserves documentation relating to the historical institutions of the territory, including records from the administrations of the Kingdom of Naples and the Kingdom of the Two Sicilies, as well as those produced by the local offices of the Kingdom of Italy and the Italian Republic. It also holds records from courts, state offices, and other public institutions active in the province.

== Sources ==
- "Archivio di Stato di Salerno". Guida generale degli Archivi di Stato italiani. Vol. IV. Rome: Ministero per i beni culturali e ambientali. 1994. pp. 5–34.
- "Archivio di Stato di Salerno". Sistema archivistico nazionale (in Italian). Istituto centrale per gli archivi.
