= State Archives of Belluno =

State archival institution in Belluno, Italy

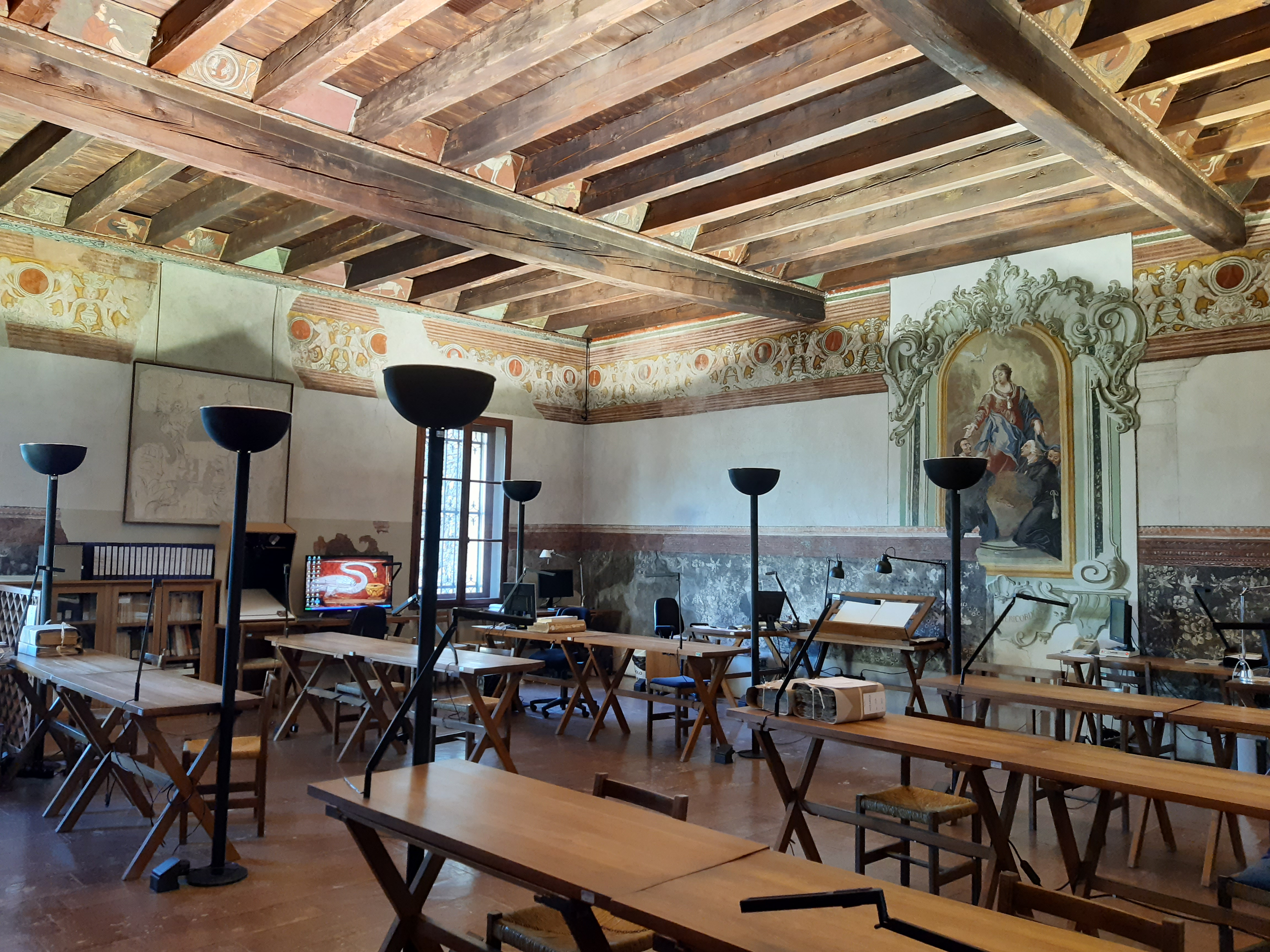
- Interactive map of State Archives of Belluno
- 46°08′13″N 12°13′13″E
- Location: Belluno, Veneto, Italy
- Type: State archive
- Established: 5 October 1973
- Website: https://archiviodistatobelluno.beniculturali.it/index.php?it/1/home

The State Archives of Belluno (Italian: Archivio di Stato di Belluno) is a public archival institution located in Belluno, Veneto, Italy. It preserves records produced by state offices and public institutions operating in the province of Belluno as part of the national archival system administered by the Ministry of Culture.

The institution was established on 5 October 1973, although state supervision of archives in the area had already begun in 1957 with the creation of the first archival supervisory commissions for local government offices. In 1976, the archive moved to the historic building of the School of the Confraternity of Santa Maria dei Battuti in Belluno, previously used by the District Notarial Archive since 1806.

== Sources ==
- "Archivio di Stato di Belluno" (PDF). Guida generale degli Archivi di Stato italiani. Vol. I. Rome: Ministero per i beni culturali e ambientali. 1981. pp. 513–516.
- "Archivio di Stato di Belluno". Sistema informativo degli Archivi di Stato. Ministero della cultura.
