= State Archives of Ascoli Piceno =

State archival institution in Ascoli Piceno, Italy

- Interactive map of State Archives of Ascoli Piceno
- 42°51′27″N 13°34′01″E
- Location: Ascoli Piceno, Marche, Italy
- Type: State archive
- Website: https://www.archiviodistatoap.it/

The State Archives of Ascoli Piceno (Italian: Archivio di Stato di Ascoli Piceno) is a state archival institution located in Ascoli Piceno, in the Marche region of Italy. It preserves historical records produced by the peripheral offices of the Italian state in the province of Ascoli Piceno and other archival collections of historical interest.

The institution was established as a Section of the State Archives by ministerial decree on 26 April 1954 and began operating in 1962 after the completion of its present headquarters. It became an independent State Archives in 1963. During its formative phase the archive was directed by Elio Lodolini.

The holdings include records of pre-unification administrations, notarial archives, and the archives of suppressed religious corporations, some dating back to the 11th century and including imperial diplomas and papal privileges. The archive also preserves documentation from state offices from the unification of Italy to the twentieth century, as well as deposits from the Municipality and Province of Ascoli Piceno, private and family archives, and specialized collections such as a photographic archive and the papers of the architect Vincenzo Pilotti.

== Sources ==
- "Archivio di Stato di Ascoli Piceno" (PDF). Guida generale degli Archivi di Stato italiani. Vol. I. Rome: Ministero per i beni culturali e ambientali. 1983. pp. 387–428.
- Lodolini, Elio (1959). "Problemi e soluzioni per la creazione di un Archivio di Stato (Ascoli Piceno)". Rassegna degli Archivi di Stato. 19 (2). Rome: 197–273.

== See also ==
- List of State Archives of Italy
