= State Archives of Savona =

State archival institution in Savona, Italy

- Interactive map of State Archives of Savona
- 44°17′55″N 8°27′25″E
- Location: Savona, Liguria, Italy
- Type: State archive
- Established: 1942
- Website: https://archiviodistatosavona.cultura.gov.it/

The State Archives of Savona (Italian: Archivio di Stato di Savona) is the state archival institution in Savona, Liguria, Italy. It preserves historical records produced by public offices and institutions in the province of Savona as part of the national archival network administered by the Ministry of Culture.

The institution was established as a Section of the State Archives in 1942, in implementation of Law no. 2006 of 22 December 1939. It became the State Archives of Savona following the archival reform enacted by Presidential Decree no. 1409 of 30 September 1963.

The archives preserve records of the peripheral offices of the Italian state as well as those of political, administrative, and judicial institutions of the pre-unification period that operated in the territory of the province. The holdings also include some fonds produced by institutions that today belong to the provinces of Alessandria, Cuneo, and Imperia.

== Sources ==
- "Archivio di Stato di Savona" (PDF). Guida generale degli Archivi di Stato italiani. Vol. IV. Rome: Ministero per i beni culturali e ambientali. 1994. pp. 53–82.
- "Archivio di Stato di Savona". Sistema informativo degli Archivi di Stato (in Italian). Istituto centrale per gli archivi.
