= State Archives of L'Aquila =

State archival institution in L'Aquila, Italy

- Interactive map of State Archives of L'Aquila
- 42°20′30″N 13°27′40″E
- Location: L'Aquila, Abruzzo, Italy
- Type: State archive
- Established: 1812
- Website: http://www.archiviodistatolaquila.beniculturali.it/

The State Archives of L'Aquila (Italian: Archivio di Stato dell'Aquila) is a public archival institution located in L'Aquila, Italy. It preserves historical records produced by governmental and administrative institutions that operated in the province of L'Aquila and forms part of the national archival network administered by the Italian Ministry of Culture.

The archive preserves documentation relating to the historical institutions of the territory, including records from the administrations of the Kingdom of Naples, the Kingdom of the Two Sicilies, and later from the Kingdom of Italy and the Italian Republic. It also holds records produced by local courts, state offices, and other public bodies operating in the province.

It also includes the branch Sections in Avezzano and Sulmona.

== Sources ==
- "Archivio di Stato di L'Aquila" (PDF). Guida generale degli Archivi di Stato italiani. Vol. I. Rome: Ministero per i beni culturali e ambientali. 1981. pp. 435–468.
- "Archivio di Stato dell'Aquila". Sistema archivistico nazionale (in Italian). Istituto centrale per gli archivi.
