= State Archives of Asti =

State archival institution in Asti, Italy

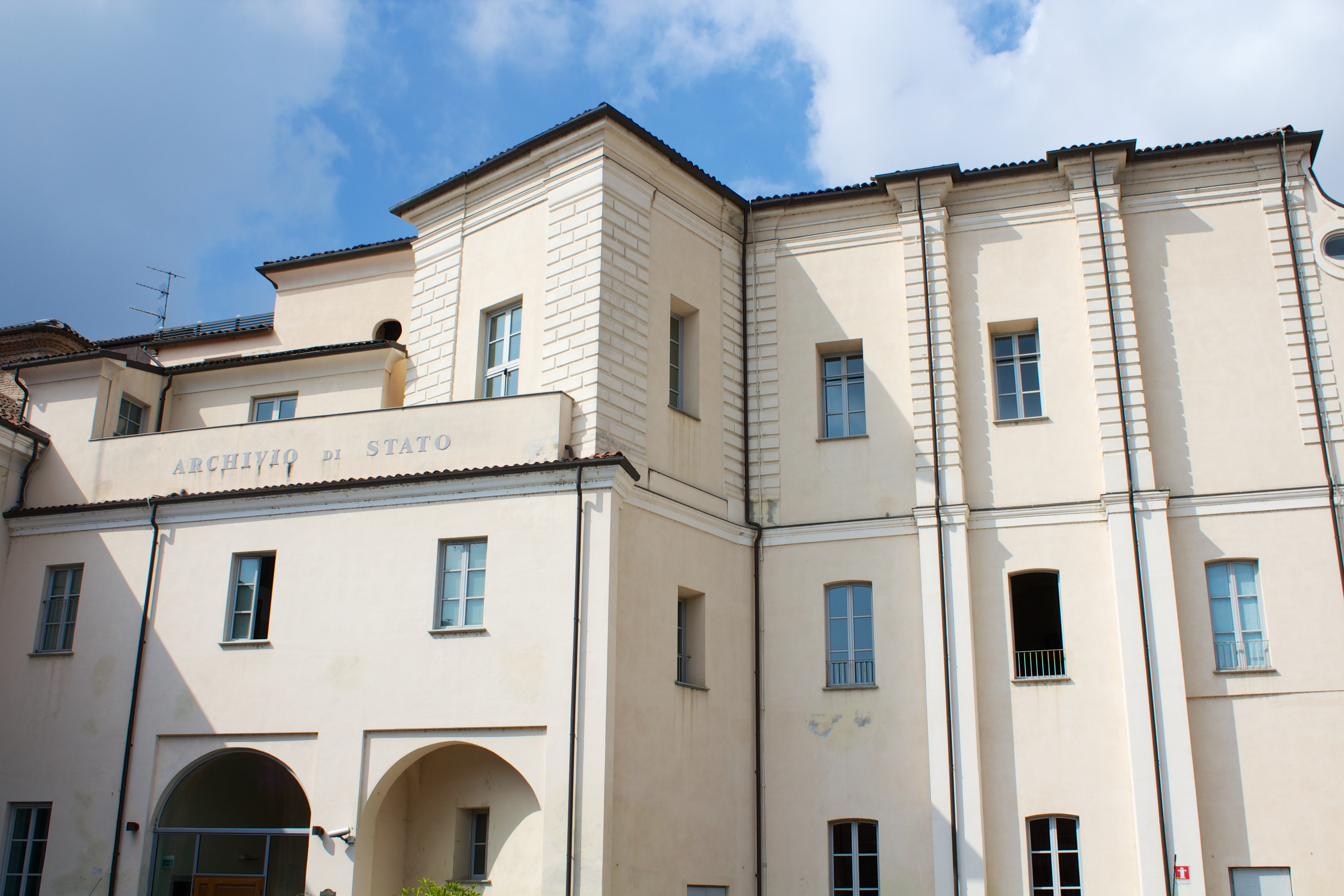
- Interactive map of State Archives of Asti
- 44°54′N 8°12′E
- Location: Asti, Piedmont, Italy
- Type: State archive
- Established: 15 April 1959
- Website: http://www.archiviodistatoasti.beniculturali.it

The State Archives of Asti (Italian: Archivio di Stato di Asti) is the state archival institution in Asti, Piedmont, Italy. It preserves historical records produced by public offices and institutions in the province of Asti as part of the national archival network administered by the Ministry of Culture. The archives are located in the former Cistercian monastery of Santo Spirito and Sant'Anna.

== Sources ==
- "Archivio di Stato di Asti" (PDF). Guida generale degli Archivi di Stato italiani. Vol. I. Rome: Ministero per i beni culturali e ambientali. 1981. pp. 429–445.
- "Archivio di Stato di Asti". Sistema Archivistico Nazionale (in Italian). Istituto centrale per gli archivi.
