= State Archives of Pordenone =

State archival institution in Pordenone, Italy

- Interactive map of State Archives of Pordenone
- 45°57′49″N 12°39′16″E
- Location: Pordenone, Friuli-Venezia Giulia, Italy
- Type: State archive
- Established: 9 September 1964
- Website: http://www.archiviodistatopordenone.beniculturali.it

The State Archives of Pordenone (Italian: Archivio di Stato di Pordenone) is the state archival institution in Pordenone, Friuli-Venezia Giulia, Italy. It preserves historical records produced by public offices and institutions in the province of Pordenone as part of the national archival network administered by the Ministry of Culture.

The institution was established on 9 September 1964.

== Sources ==
- "Archivio di Stato di Pordenone" (PDF). Guida generale degli Archivi di Stato italiani (in Italian). Vol. III. Rome: Ministero per i beni culturali e ambientali. 1983. pp. 807–821.
- "Archivio di Stato di Pordenone". Sistema informativo degli Archivi di Stato (in Italian). Istituto centrale per gli archivi.
