= State Archives of Alessandria =

State archival institution in Alessandria, Italy

- Interactive map of State Archives of Alessandria
- 44°54′50″N 8°37′34″E
- Location: Alessandria, Piedmont, Italy
- Type: State archive
- Established: 5 December 1940
- Website: https://archiviodistatoalessandria.cultura.gov.it/

The State Archives of Alessandria (Italian: Archivio di Stato di Alessandria) is the state archival institution in Alessandria, Piedmont, Italy. It preserves historical records produced by public offices and institutions in the province of Alessandria as part of the national archival network administered by the Ministry of Culture.

The institution was established as a Section of the State Archives on 5 December 1940, and became a full State Archive on 30 September 1963.

== Sources ==
- "Archivio di Stato di Alessandria" (PDF). Guida generale degli Archivi di Stato italiani. Vol. I. Rome: Ministero per i beni culturali e ambientali. 1981. pp. 313–331.
- "Archivio di Stato di Alessandria". Sistema Archivistico Nazionale (in Italian). Istituto centrale per gli archivi.
