= State Archives of Biella =

State archival institution in Biella, Italy

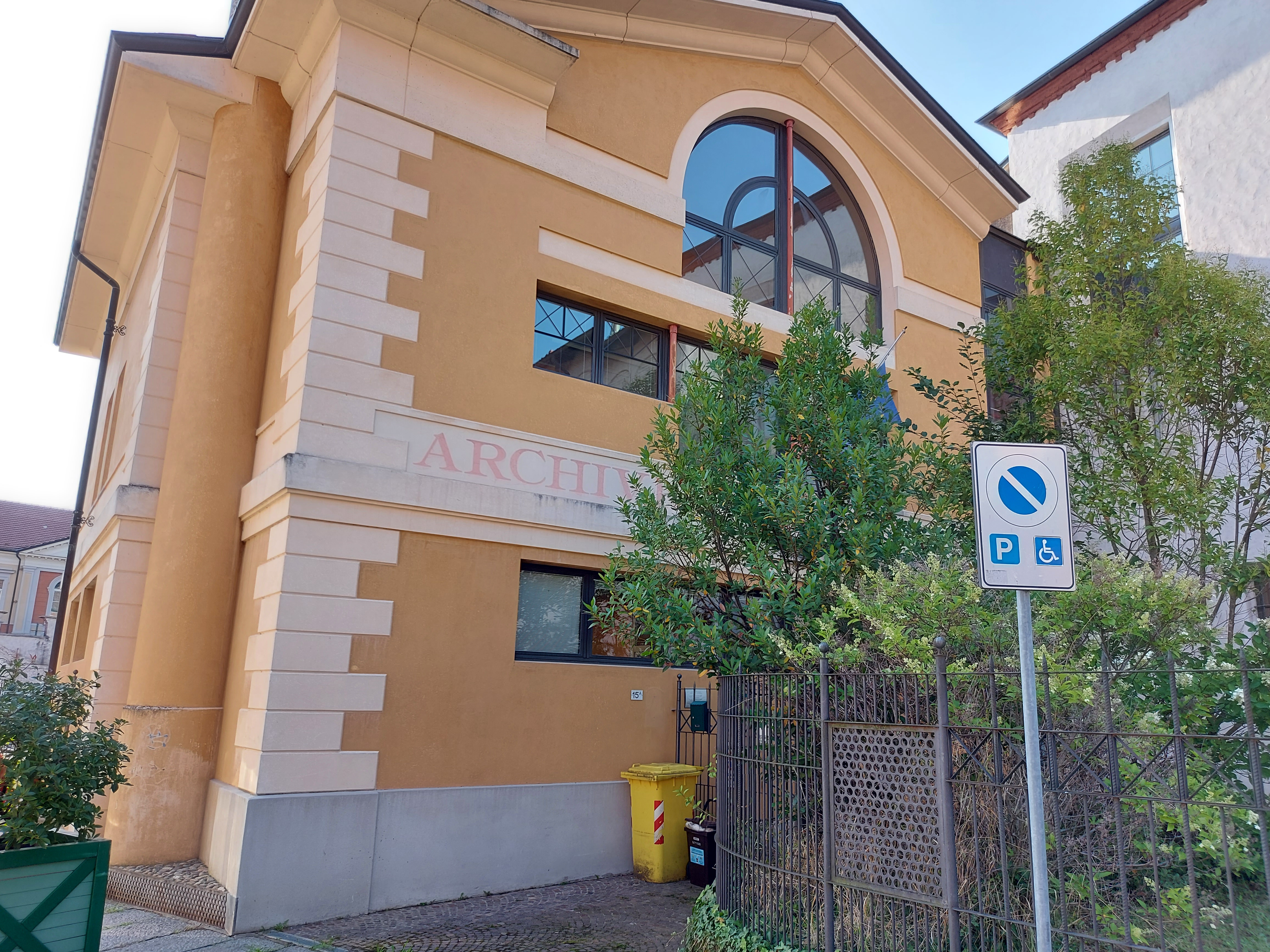
- Interactive map of State Archives of Biella
- 45°33′53″N 8°02′59″E
- Location: Biella, Piedmont, Italy
- Type: State archive
- Established: 29 April 1967
- Website: http://www.asbi.it

The State Archives of Biella (Italian: Archivio di Stato di Biella) is the state archival institution in Biella, Piedmont, Italy. It preserves historical records produced by public offices and institutions in the province of Biella as part of the national archival network administered by the Ministry of Culture.

The institution was established on 29 April 1967 as a Section of the State Archives of Vercelli. Following the creation of the Province of Biella in 1992, the archives became independent on 25 August 1997.

== Sources ==
- "Archivio di Stato di Vercelli. Sezione di Archivio di Stato di Biella" (PDF). Guida generale degli Archivi di Stato italiani. Vol. IV. Rome: Ministero per i beni culturali e ambientali. 1994. pp. 1188–1212.
- "Archivio di Stato di Biella". Sistema informativo degli Archivi di Stato (in Italian). Istituto centrale per gli archivi.
