= State Archives of Macerata =

State archival institution in Macerata, Italy

- Interactive map of State Archives of Macerata
- 43°17′45″N 13°27′24″E
- Location: Macerata, Marche, Italy
- Type: State archive
- Website: https://archiviodistatomacerata.cultura.gov.it/

The State Archives of Macerata (Italian: Archivio di Stato di Macerata) is a state archive located in Macerata, Marche, Italy. It is the peripheral office of the Ministry of Culture responsible for preserving, organizing, and providing access to historical documents produced by local and state authorities in the province of Macerata. The institution was originally established as a Section of the State Archives in 1941 and became an autonomous State Archive with the decree of 30 September 1963.

Its collection includes municipal records, pontifical magistrature archives, judicial and notarial documents, cadastral maps, and private collections, covering a period from the Middle Ages to the present day. A Section office in Camerino was established in 1967.

== Sources ==
- "Archivio di Stato di Macerata" (PDF). Guida generale degli Archivi di Stato italiani. Vol. II. Ministero per i beni culturali e ambientali. 1983. pp. 691–757.
- "Archivio di Stato di Macerata". Sistema informativo degli Archivi di Stato.
