= State Archives of Rimini =

State archival institution in Rimini, Italy

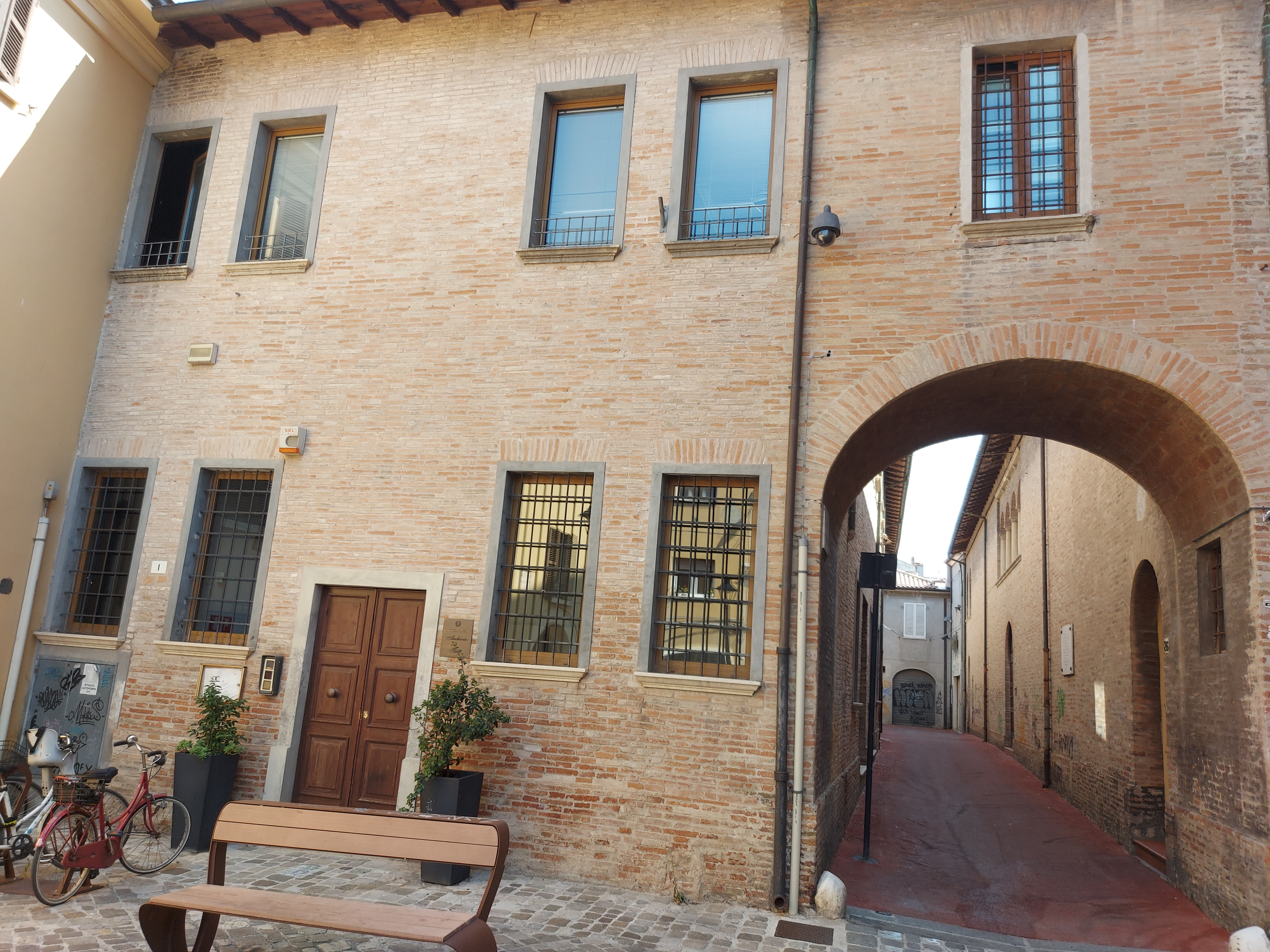
- Interactive map of State Archives of Rimini
- 44°03′29″N 12°34′04″E
- Location: Rimini, Emilia-Romagna, Italy
- Type: State archive
- Established: 27 March 1972
- Website: https://archiviodistatorimini.cultura.gov.it/

The State Archives of Rimini (Italian: Archivio di Stato di Rimini) is the state archival institution in Rimini, Emilia-Romagna, Italy. It preserves historical records produced by public offices and institutions in the province of Rimini as part of the national archival network administered by the Ministry of Culture.

== History ==
The archives were initially established as a Section of the State Archives of Forlì to house archival materials previously preserved in the Biblioteca Civica Gambalunga. The creation of the Section was approved on 27 March 1972 and it was opened to the public on 1 June 1978.

Following the establishment of the province of Rimini in 1992, the institution became independent from Forlì in 1997.

The first seat of the archives was located at Via Carlo Cattaneo in Palazzo Pedrocca-Agolanti. In 1999, the institution was transferred to its current building in Piazzetta San Bernardino.

== Sources ==
- "Archivio di Stato di Forlì. Sezione di Archivio di Stato di Rimini". Guida generale degli Archivi di Stato italiani. Rome: Ministero per i beni culturali e ambientali. 1983. pp. 266–278.
- "Archivio di Stato di Rimini". Sistema informativo degli Archivi di Stato (in Italian). Istituto centrale per gli archivi.
