= State Archives of Cremona =

State archival institution in Cremona, Italy

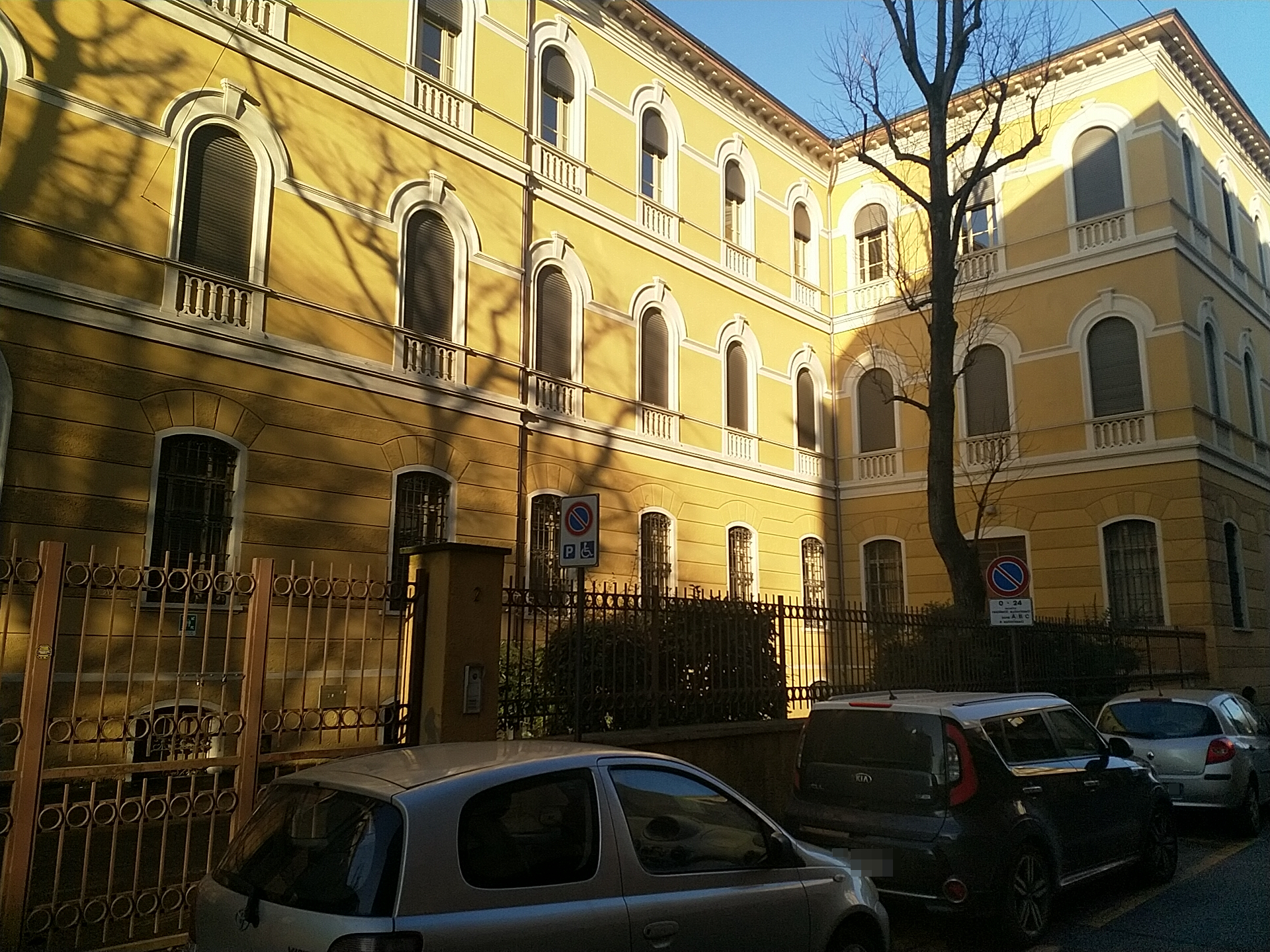
- Interactive map of State Archives of Cremona
- 45°08′21″N 10°01′23″E
- Location: Cremona, Lombardy, Italy
- Type: State archive
- Established: 21 November 1955
- Website: http://www.archiviodistatocremona.beniculturali.it

The State Archives of Cremona (Italian: Archivio di Stato di Cremona) is the state archival institution in Cremona, Lombardy, Italy. It preserves historical records produced by public offices and institutions in the province of Cremona as part of the national archival network administered by the Ministry of Culture.

It was established by ministerial decree on 21 November 1955 and became operational in 1958.

== Sources ==
- "Archivio di Stato di Cremona" (PDF). Guida generale degli Archivi di Stato italiani. Vol. I. Rome: Ministero per i beni culturali e ambientali. 1981. pp. 987–1013.
- "Archivio di Stato di Cremona". Sistema informativo degli Archivi di Stato (in Italian). Istituto centrale per gli archivi.
