= State Archives of Potenza =

State archival institution in Potenza, Italy

- Interactive map of State Archives of Potenza
- 40°38′07″N 15°48′23″E
- Location: Potenza, Basilicata, Italy
- Type: State archive
- Established: 1812
- Website: https://archiviodistatodipotenza.cultura.gov.it/

The State Archives of Potenza (Italian: Archivio di Stato di Potenza) is a public archival institution located in Potenza, Italy. It preserves historical records produced by governmental and administrative institutions that operated in the province of Potenza and forms part of the national archival network administered by the Italian Ministry of Culture.

The archive preserves documentation relating to the historical institutions of the territory, including records from the administrations of the Kingdom of Naples and the Kingdom of the Two Sicilies, as well as those produced by the local offices of the Kingdom of Italy and the Italian Republic. It also holds records from courts, state offices, and other public institutions active in the province.

== Sources ==
- "Archivio di Stato di Potenza" (PDF). Guida generale degli Archivi di Stato italiani. Vol. III. Rome: Ministero per i beni culturali e ambientali. 1986. pp. 826–849.
- "Archivio di Stato di Potenza". Sistema informativo degli Archivi di Stato (in Italian). Istituto centrale per gli archivi.
