= State Archives of Sondrio =

State archival institution in Sondrio, Italy

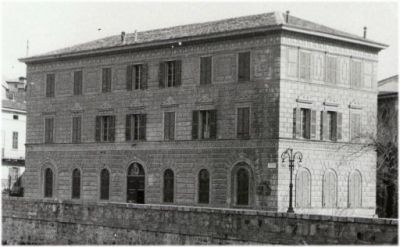
- Interactive map of State Archives of Sondrio
- 46°10′16″N 9°52′11″E
- Location: Sondrio, Lombardy, Italy
- Type: State archive
- Established: 3 October 1946
- Website: http://www.archiviodistatosondrio.beniculturali.it, http://www.assondrio.beniculturali.it/

The State Archives of Sondrio (Italian: Archivio di Stato di Sondrio) is the state archival institution in Sondrio, Lombardy, Italy. It preserves historical records produced by public offices and institutions in the province of Sondrio as part of the national archival network administered by the Ministry of Culture.

The institution was established as a Section of the State Archives by ministerial decree on 3 October 1946. It became an independent State Archives following the enactment of Presidential Decree of 30 September 1963, which reorganized the Italian archival system.

== Sources ==
- "Archivio di Stato di Sondrio" (PDF). Guida generale degli Archivi di Stato italiani. Vol. IV. Rome: Ministero per i beni culturali e ambientali. 1994. pp. 245–262.
- "Archivio di Stato di Sondrio". Sistema informativo degli Archivi di Stato (in Italian). Istituto centrale per gli archivi.
