= State Archives of Terni =

State archival institution in Terni, Italy

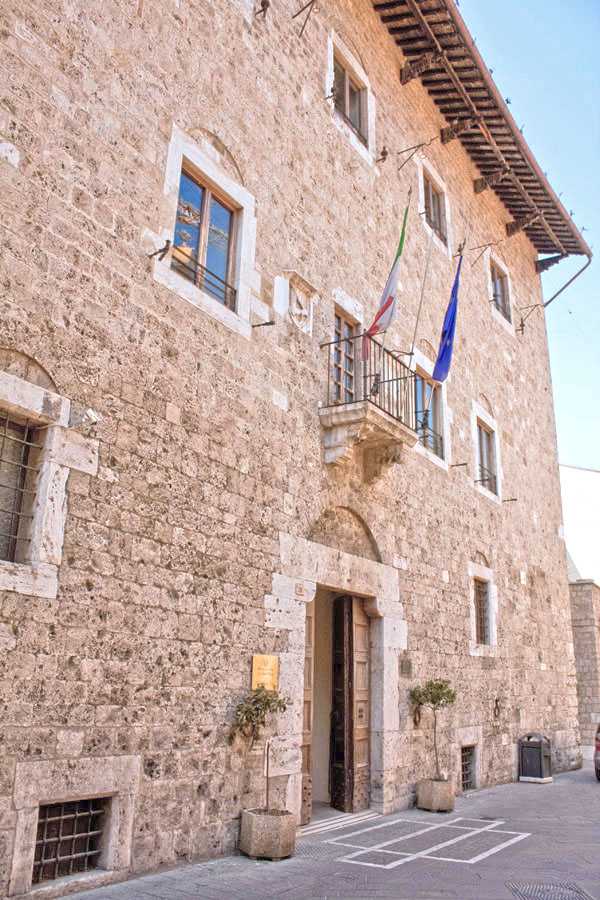
- Palazzo Mazzancolli
- Interactive map of State Archives of Terni
- 42.56219°N 12.645788°E
- Location: Terni, Umbria, Italy
- Type: State archive

Building information
- Building: Palazzo Mazzancolli
- Website: http://www.asterni.beniculturali.it

The State Archives of Terni (Italian: Archivio di Stato di Terni) is a state archive located in Terni, Umbria, Italy. It is the peripheral office of the Ministry of Culture responsible for preserving, organizing, and providing access to historical documents produced by state and local authorities in the province of Terni, as well as private archival collections of historical significance.

The institution was established as a Section of the State Archives on 15 May 1957 and became autonomous on 30 September 1963. Since 2002, it has been housed in the historic Palazzo Mazzancolli. The archives preserve records dating from the 14th to the 20th century, including municipal, judicial, and notarial documents, as well as industrial company archives related to the economic history of the city.

The institute also supervises the branch Orvieto Section.

== Sources ==
- "Archivio di Stato di Terni" (PDF). Guida generale degli Archivi di Stato italiani. Vol. IV. Rome: Ministry of Cultural Heritage and Activities. 1994. pp. 315–338.
- "Archivio di Stato di Terni". Sistema informativo degli Archivi di Stato. Ministry of Culture.
