= State Archives of Pisa =

State archival institution in Pisa, Italy

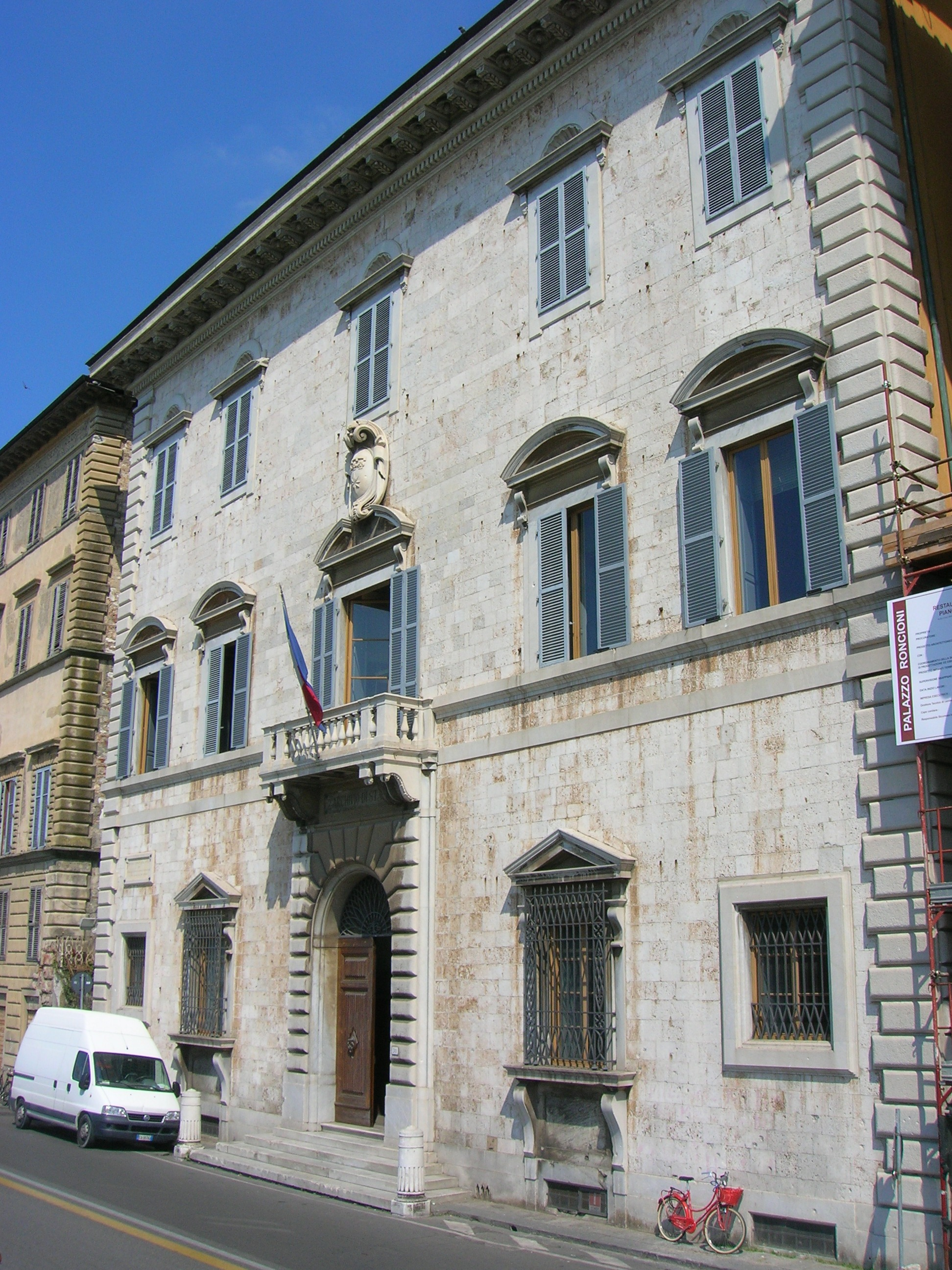
- Palazzo Toscanelli
- Interactive map of State Archives of Pisa
- 43°42′55″N 10°24′21″E
- Location: Pisa, Tuscany, Italy
- Type: State archive
- Established: 22 February 1860

Building information
- Building: Palazzo Toscanelli
- Website: http://www.aspisa.beniculturali.it/

The State Archives of Pisa (Italian: Archivio di Stato di Pisa) is a state archive located in Pisa, Tuscany, Italy. It is a peripheral office of the Italian Ministry of Culture responsible for preserving historical records produced by public institutions in the province of Pisa, as well as other archival collections of historical significance acquired through deposits, donations, or purchases.

Established on 22 February 1860 by the Provisional Government of Tuscany, the archive holds documentation originating from the archives of the Republic of Pisa, the municipal administration during Florentine rule, and the period of the Grand Duchy of Tuscany. Its collections also include records from local religious and charitable institutions and private family archives. The holdings contain documents dating back to the eighth century.

== Sources ==
- "Archivio di Stato di Pisa". Guida generale degli Archivi di Stato italiani. Rome: Ministero per i beni culturali e ambientali. 1983.
- "Archivio di Stato di Pisa". Sistema Archivistico Nazionale.
