= State Archives of Benevento =

State archival institution in Benevento, Italy

- Interactive map of State Archives of Benevento
- 41°07′54″N 14°46′37″E
- Location: Benevento, Campania, Italy
- Type: State archive
- Established: 10 April 1954
- Website: https://asbn.cultura.gov.it/

The State Archives of Benevento (Italian: Archivio di Stato di Benevento) is the state archival institution in Benevento, Campania, Italy. It preserves historical records produced by public offices and institutions in the province of Benevento as part of the national archival network administered by the Ministry of Culture.

It was established as a Section of the State Archives by ministerial decree on 10 April 1954. It was later elevated to the status of a full State Archive following the archival reform of 30 September 1963.

Since 1996, the archives have been housed in the Archiepiscopal Seminary of Benevento.

== Sources ==
- Taddeo, Valeria (2013). Archivio di Stato di Benevento. Viterbo: BetaGamma.
- "Archivio di Stato di Benevento" (PDF). Guida generale degli Archivi di Stato italiani (in Italian). Vol. I. Rome: Ministero per i beni culturali e ambientali. 1981. pp. 517–531.
- "Archivio di Stato di Benevento". Sistema informativo degli Archivi di Stato (in Italian). Istituto centrale per gli archivi.
