= State Archives of Taranto =

State archival institution in Taranto, Italy

- Interactive map of State Archives of Taranto
- 40°28′16″N 17°14′37″E
- Location: Taranto, Apulia, Italy
- Type: State archive
- Established: 30 October 1946
- Website: https://archiviodistatotaranto.cultura.gov.it

The State Archives of Taranto (Italian: Archivio di Stato di Taranto) is the state archival institution in Taranto, Apulia, Italy. It preserves historical records produced by public offices and institutions in the province of Taranto as part of the national archival network administered by the Ministry of Culture.

It was originally established as a Section of the State Archives by Ministerial Decree on 30 October 1946. It was later elevated to the status of a full State Archive following the archival reform of 30 September 1963.

== Sources ==
- "Archivio di Stato di Taranto" (PDF). Guida generale degli Archivi di Stato italiani (in Italian). Vol. IV (S–Z). Rome: Ministero per i beni culturali e ambientali. 1994. pp. 263–281.
- "Archivio di Stato di Taranto". Sistema informativo degli Archivi di Stato (in Italian). Istituto centrale per gli archivi.
