= State Archives of Perugia =

State archival institution in Perugia, Italy

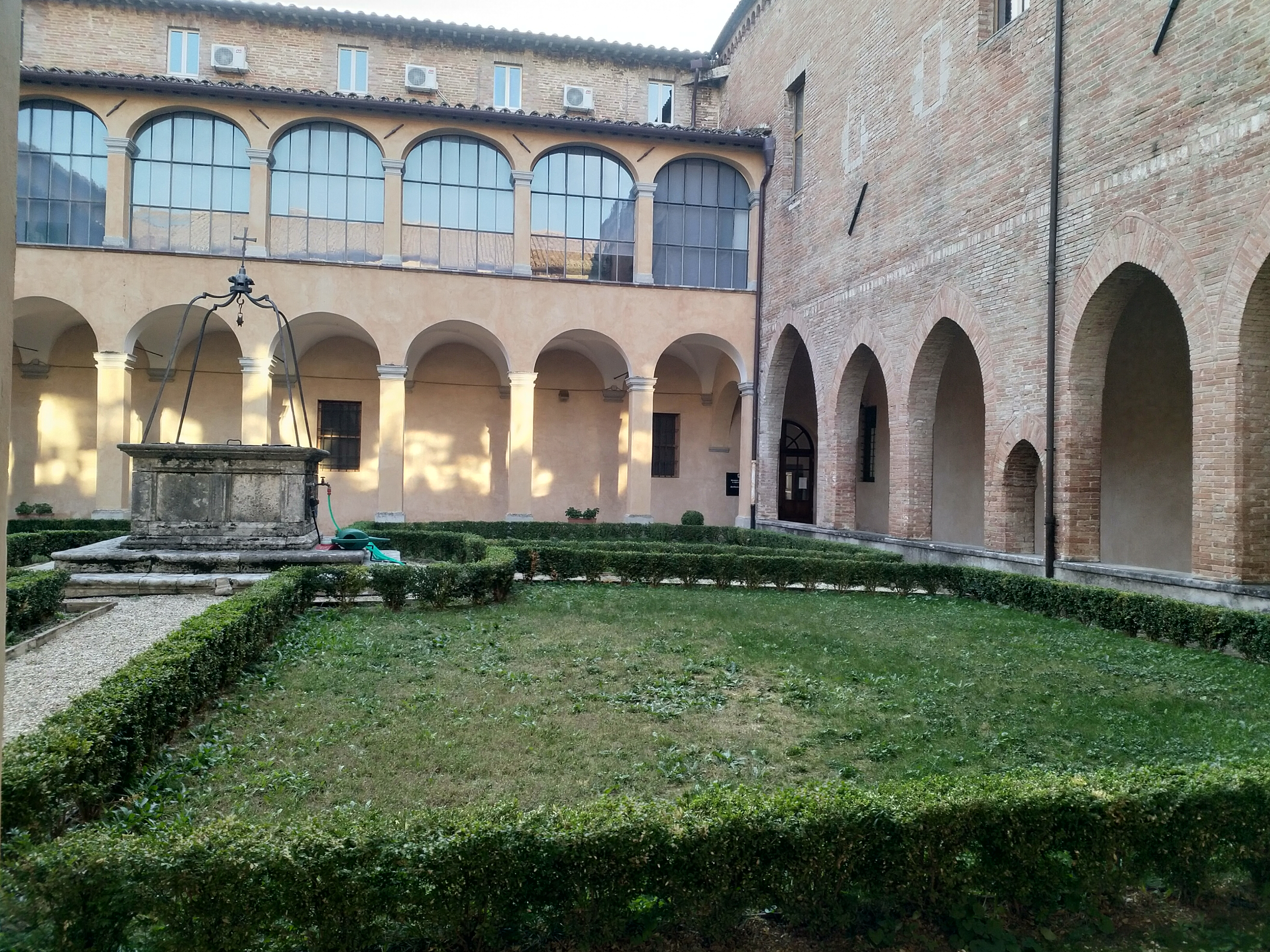
- Interactive map of State Archives of Perugia
- 43°06′25″N 12°23′29″E
- Location: Perugia, Umbria, Italy
- Type: State archive

Building information
- Building: Convent of San Domenico
- Website: http://www.archiviodistatoperugia.it/

The State Archives of Perugia (Italian: Archivio di Stato di Perugia) is a state archive located in Perugia, Umbria, Italy. It is the peripheral office of the Ministry of Culture responsible for preserving, organizing, and providing access to historical records produced by local and state authorities in the province of Perugia, as well as private archival collections of historical importance.

The institution was established in 1941 following national legislation providing for the creation of state archives in each Italian province. Since 1947 it has been housed in part of the former Dominican convent attached to the Basilica of San Domenico. The archives preserve extensive documentary holdings, including municipal and ecclesiastical records, judicial archives, notarial records, cadastral documentation, and private and family papers, as well as a specialized research library.

The institute also oversees branch Sections in Assisi, Foligno, Gubbio, and Spoleto.

== Sources ==
- Cecchini, Giovanni (December 1949 – January 1950). "L'Archivio di Stato di Perugia". Perugia.
- Gli archivi dell'Umbria. Pubblicazioni degli Archivi di Stato. Vol. XXX. Rome: Ministero dell'interno – Soprintendenza archivistica per il Lazio, l'Umbria e le Marche. 1957.
- Roncetti, Mario (1988). "La Biblioteca Augusta e l'Archivio di Stato. Le altre biblioteche". In Rossi, Raffaele (ed.). Storia illustrata delle città dell'Umbria: Perugia. Vol. III. Avellino: Elio Sellino.
- "Archivio di Stato di Perugia". Sistema informativo degli Archivi di Stato. Ministero della cultura.
