= State Archives of Avellino =

State archival institution in Avellino, Italy

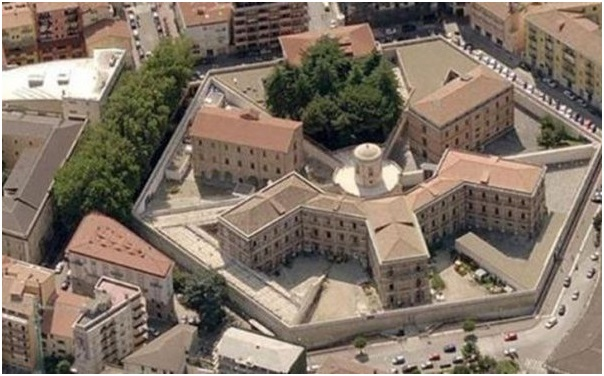
- Interactive map of State Archives of Avellino
- 40°54′51″N 14°47′17″E
- Location: Avellino, Campania, Italy
- Type: State archives
- Established: 1818
- Director: Lorenzo Terzi
- Website: http://www.asavellino.beniculturali.it/

The State Archives of Avellino (Italian: Archivio di Stato di Avellino) is a state archive in Avellino, Campania, southern Italy. It is a peripheral office of the Italian Ministry of Culture responsible for preserving historical records produced by the local offices of the Italian state in the province of Avellino, as well as other historically significant archival collections acquired through deposit, donation, or purchase.

The institution was established in 1818 under legislation of the Kingdom of the Two Sicilies providing for the creation of provincial archives. Since 2007 it has been housed in the former Bourbon prison complex (Carcere borbonico) of Avellino. Its holdings include administrative, judicial, notarial, ecclesiastical, and private archives dating from the Middle Ages to the 20th century.

== Sources ==
- "Archivio di Stato di Avellino" (PDF). Guida generale degli Archivi di Stato italiani (in Italian). Vol. I. Rome: Ministero per i beni culturali e ambientali. 1983. pp. 447–472.
