= State Archives of Parma =

State archival institution in Parma, Italy

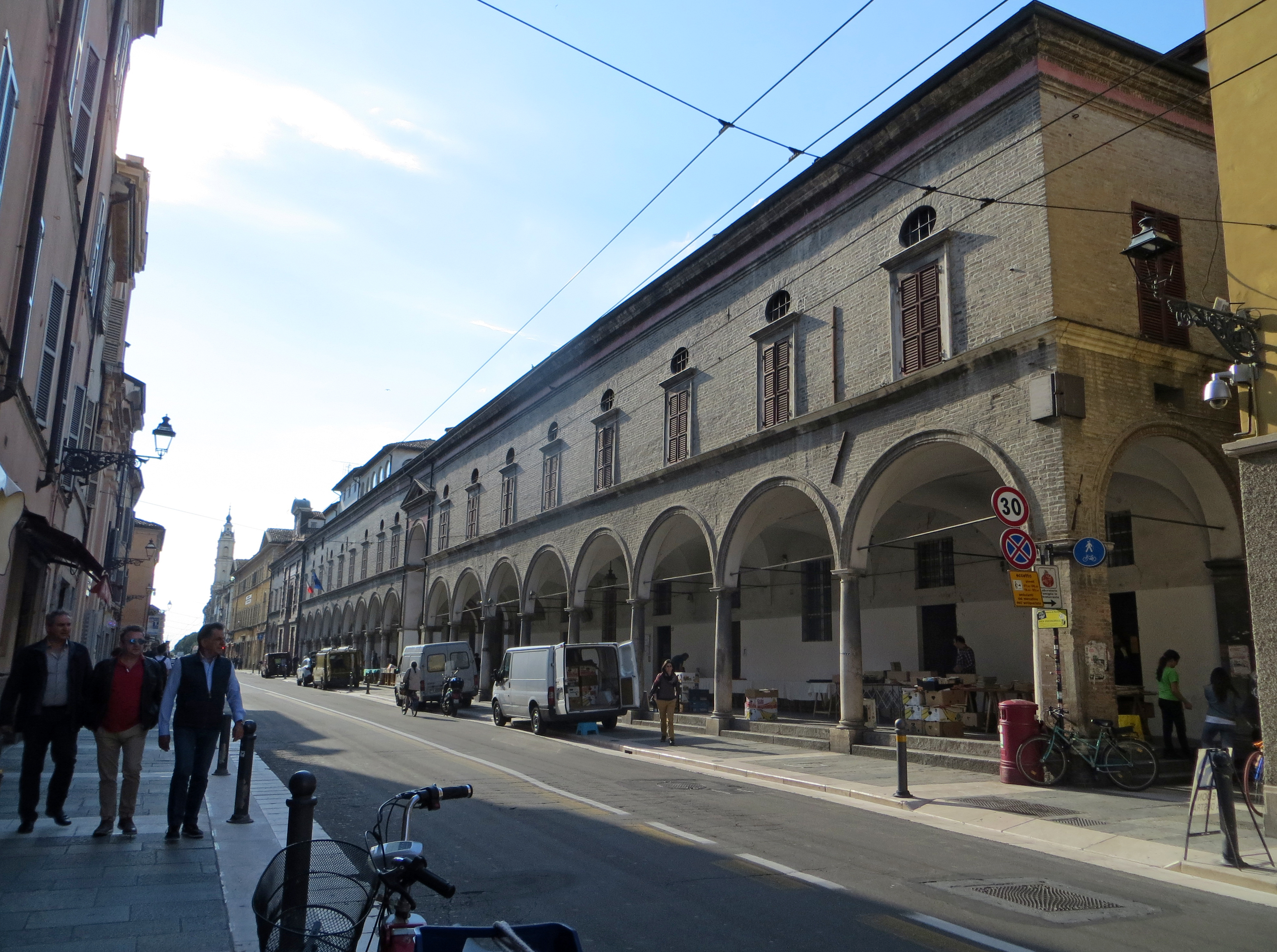
- Interactive map of State Archives of Parma
- 44°48′12″N 10°19′09″E
- Location: Parma, Emilia-Romagna, Italy
- Type: State archive

Building information
- Building: Old Hospital
- Website: http://www.archiviodistatoparma.beniculturali.it

The State Archives of Parma (Italian: Archivio di Stato di Parma) is the state archival institution in Parma, Italy. It preserves historical records produced by public offices and institutions in the city and province and forms part of the network of state archives administered by the Italian Ministry of Culture.

The holdings include records of the historical administrations of the Duchy of Parma and Piacenza, as well as documents from Napoleonic and post-unification Italian government offices.

== Sources ==
- "Archivio di Stato di Parma" (PDF). Guida generale degli Archivi di Stato italiani (in Italian). Vol. III (N–R). Rome: Ministero per i beni culturali e ambientali. 1986. pp. 361–438.
- Dallatana, Francesca (1997). Dove pulsa la storia: grand tour negli archivi di Parma. Parma: PPS.
