= State Archives of Reggio Emilia =

State archival institution in Reggio Emilia, Italy

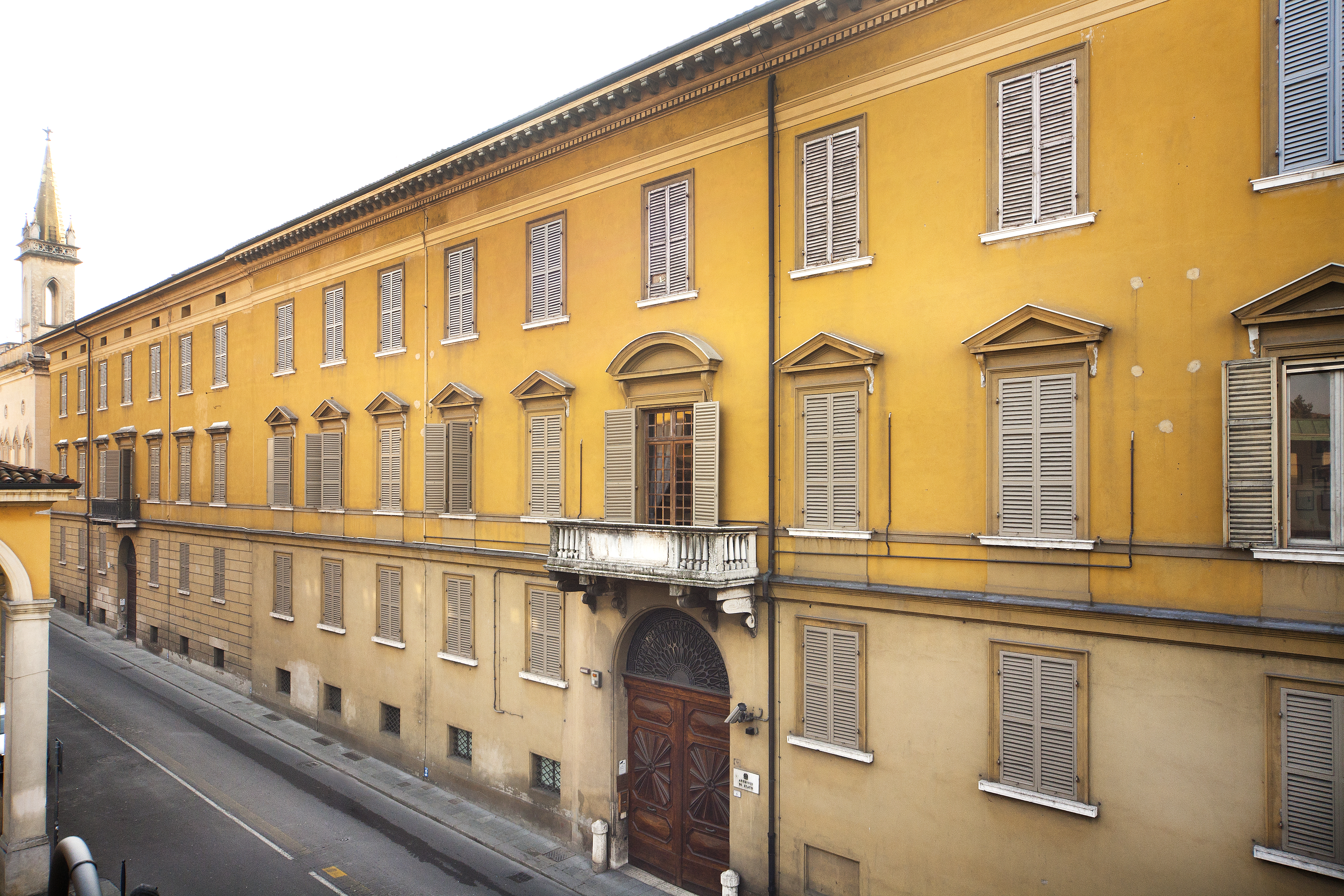
- Interactive map of State Archives of Reggio Emilia
- 44°42′02″N 10°37′41″E
- Location: Reggio Emilia, Italy
- Type: State archive
- Established: 1887

Building information
- Building: Palazzo Carmi
- Website: http://www.archiviodistatoreggioemilia.beniculturali.it/

The State Archives of Reggio Emilia (Italian: Archivio di Stato di Reggio Emilia) is a public archival institution located in Reggio Emilia, Italy. It preserves historical records produced by governmental and administrative institutions operating in the province of Reggio Emilia and forms part of the national archival network administered by the Italian Ministry of Culture.

The archive preserves documentation relating to the historical institutions of the territory, including records produced under the Duchy of Modena and Reggio, ruled by the House of Este, as well as those created by the administrative offices of the Kingdom of Italy and the Italian Republic.

The institution was established in January 1887 as the Provincial General Archive through the initiative of local public bodies, including the municipality, the province, and several consortia. By royal decree of 20 March 1892 it was officially constituted as a State Archive from 1 July of the same year. It was later classified as a Section of the State Archives in 1939 and regained the full designation of State Archives following the archival reform of 1963.

== Sources ==
- "Archivio di Stato di Reggio Emilia" (PDF). Guida generale degli Archivi di Stato italiani. Vol. III. Rome: Ministero per i beni culturali e ambientali. 1986. pp. 953–998.
- "Archivio di Stato di Reggio Emilia". Sistema archivistico nazionale (in Italian). Istituto centrale per gli archivi.
- "Archivio di Stato di Reggio Emilia". Sistema informativo degli Archivi di Stato (in Italian). Ministero della cultura.
