= State Archives of Cuneo =

State archival institution in Cuneo, Italy

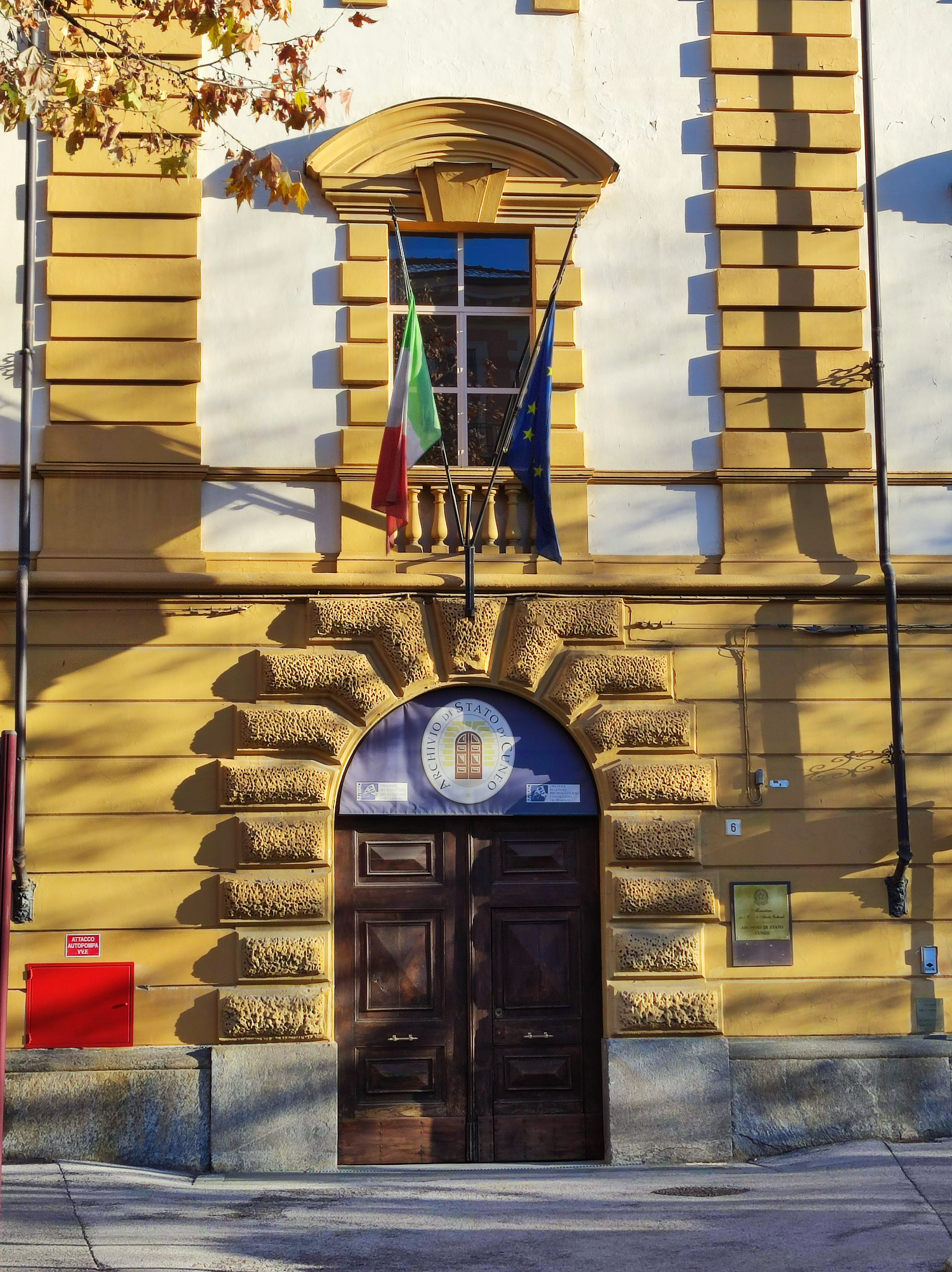
- Interactive map of State Archives of Cuneo
- 44°23′26″N 7°32′38″E
- Location: Cuneo, Piedmont, Italy
- Type: State archive
- Established: 30 September 1956
- Website: https://archiviodistatocuneo.cultura.gov.it/

The State Archives of Cuneo (Italian: Archivio di Stato di Cuneo) is the state archival institution in Cuneo, Piedmont, Italy. It preserves historical records produced by public offices and institutions in the province of Cuneo as part of the national archival network administered by the Ministry of Culture.

It preserves the records produced by the provincial administration before the unification of Italy, including the Intendancy, the Offices of Insinuation, the Prefecture, and the local courts. It also holds notarial archives from the 15th century for the districts of Alba, Cuneo, Mondovì, and Saluzzo, as well as Napoleonic-era records from the Stura Department and the first-instance courts of Mondovì and Saluzzo.

The archival holdings further include selected private and family archives, records of the hospitals of Cuneo and Mondovì, an extensive 18th-century cartographic collection, fragments of municipal archives, and post-Napoleonic administrative, notarial, and judicial records (Intendancies, Offices of Insinuation later of the Civil Register, Courts, Magistracies, and the Prefecture).

== Sources ==
- "Archivio di Stato di Cuneo" (PDF). Guida generale degli Archivi di Stato italiani. Vol. I. Rome: Ministero per i beni culturali e ambientali. 1981. pp. 1015–1029.
- "Archivio di Stato di Cuneo". Sistema informativo degli Archivi di Stato (in Italian). Istituto centrale per gli archivi.
