= State Archives of Novara =

State archival institution in Novara, Italy

- Interactive map of State Archives of Novara
- 45°26′50″N 8°37′28″E
- Location: Novara, Piedmont, Italy
- Type: State archive
- Established: 18 March 1970
- Website: https://archiviodistatonovara.cultura.gov.it/

The State Archives of Novara (Italian: Archivio di Stato di Novara) is the state archival institution in Novara, Piedmont, Italy. It preserves historical records produced by public offices and institutions in the province of Novara as part of the national archival network administered by the Ministry of Culture.

The institution was established on 18 March 1970 and opened to the public two years later in the former monastery of Santa Maria Maddalena, which hosted the notarial archive since 1810.

== Sources ==
- "Archivio di Stato di Novara" (PDF). Guida generale degli Archivi di Stato italiani. Vol. III. Rome: Ministero per i beni culturali e ambientali. 1986. pp. 164–205.
- "Archivio di Stato di Novara". Sistema Archivistico Nazionale (in Italian). Istituto centrale per gli archivi.
