= State Archives of Mantua =

State archival institution in Mantua, Italy

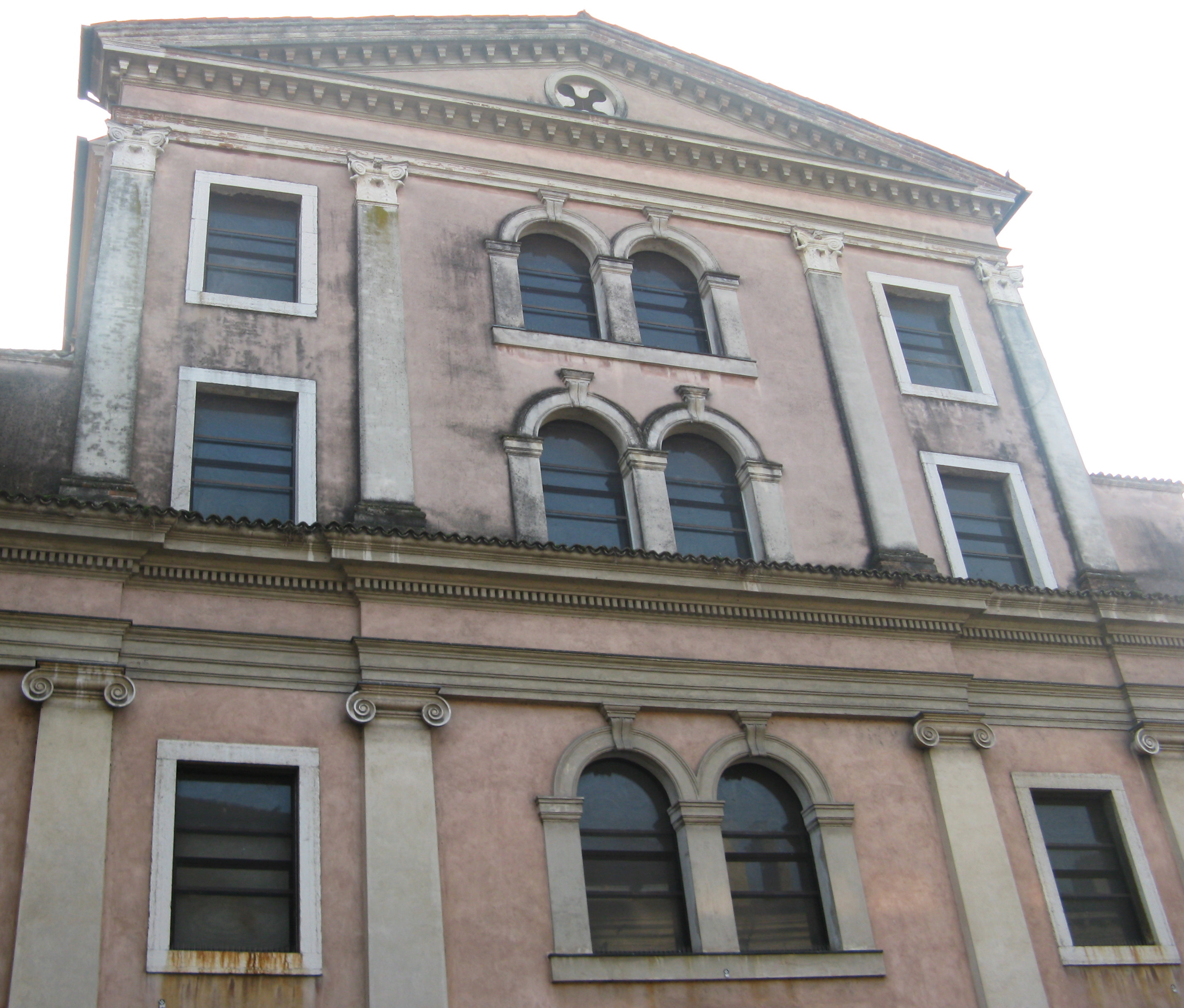
- Interactive map of State Archives of Mantua
- 45°09′29″N 10°47′49″E
- Location: Mantua, Lombardy, Italy
- Type: State archive
- Established: 24 July 1868
- Website: https://archiviodistatomantova.cultura.gov.it/home

The State Archives of Mantua (Italian: Archivio di Stato di Mantova) is the state archival institution in Mantua, Lombardy, Italy. It preserves historical records produced by public offices and institutions in the province of Mantua as part of the national archival network administered by the Ministry of Culture.

The archives were established on 24 July 1868 and were initially housed in the Ducal Palace. In 1883 the institution was transferred to its current headquarters in the Palazzo degli Studi. The archival complex also includes the former church of the Holy Trinity, which now serves as the main archival repository.

== Sources ==
- "Archivio di Stato di Mantova" (PDF). Guida generale degli Archivi di Stato italiani. Vol. II. Rome: Ministero per i beni culturali e ambientali. 1983. pp. 759–811.
- "Archivio di Stato di Mantova". Sistema informativo degli Archivi di Stato (in Italian). Istituto centrale per gli archivi.
