= State Archives of Teramo =

State archival institution in Teramo, Italy

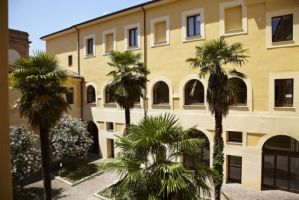
- Interactive map of State Archives of Teramo
- 42°39′38″N 13°42′10″E
- Location: Teramo, Abruzzo, Italy
- Type: State archive
- Website: http://www.archiviodistatoteramo.beniculturali.it/i

The State Archives of Teramo (Italian: Archivio di Stato di Teramo) is the state archival institution in Teramo, Abruzzo, Italy. It preserves historical records produced by public offices and institutions in the province of Teramo as part of the national archival network administered by the Ministry of Culture.

The archives were formally established in 1838 in the building of the provincial Intendancy, following the 1812 legislation of the Kingdom of Naples that required the creation of provincial archives. The institution later passed under provincial administration after Italian unification in 1865. It became the Provincial State Archive of Teramo in 1932, was redesignated as a Section of the State Archives in 1939, and obtained its status as the State Archives of Teramo following the archival reform of 30 September 1963.

== Sources ==
- "Archivio di Stato di Teramo" (PDF). Guida generale degli Archivi di Stato italiani (in Italian). Vol. IV (S–Z). Rome: Ministero per i beni culturali e ambientali. 1994. pp. 283–313.
- "Archivio di Stato di Teramo". Sistema informativo degli Archivi di Stato (in Italian). Istituto centrale per gli archivi.
