= State Archives of Trapani =

State archive of Trapani, Sicily

- Interactive map of State Archives of Trapani
- 38.01722°N 12.50301°E
- Location: via S. Anna, 22, Trapani, Italy
- Established: 1843

Building information
- Building: Former Convent of Sant’Anna
- Website: https://archiviodistatotrapani.cultura.gov.it

State Archives of Trapani (Italian: Archivio di Stato di Trapani) is the state archive responsible for the preservation of government, judicial, and administrative records relating to the city and province of Trapani, Sicily. Founded in the nineteenth century, the archive has been housed in several historic buildings of the city and is currently located in the former convent of Sant’Anna, near the Bastione Sant’Anna.

== History ==
The Archivio di Stato di Trapani was established in 1843 under the Bourbon administration of the Kingdom of the Two Sicilies as a provincial archive entrusted with the custody of judicial and governmental records. Its original headquarters were located in the Palazzo dell’Intendenza, the seat of provincial authority, corresponding to the site of the present-day Prefecture of Trapani.

Following Italian unification, the archive was transferred in 1862 to the former convent of San Rocco in the historic centre of the city (now the Museum of Contemporary Art San Rocco). This building later suffered heavy damage during aerial bombardments in the Second World War, resulting in the destruction of part of the archival holdings and the temporary dispersal of surviving materials across several locations in Trapani.

After post-war restoration work, the archive returned to San Rocco in 1961. In 2009 it was relocated to its present headquarters in the former convent of Sant’Anna, a historic religious complex situated along the line of the Mura di Tramontana adjoining the church of Santa Lucia. From 2011 onward, the building has undergone restoration and adaptation work aimed at accommodating archival functions and expanding its role as a cultural and research centre.

In 2025, 1.7 million Euro was allocated to the archive as part of a national programme by the Ministry of Culture aimed at improving accessibility to archival heritage.

== Architecture ==
The former convent of Sant’Anna is a historic religious complex located along the line of the city’s early modern fortifications near the Bastione Sant’Anna. The complex follows a cloistered layout typical of monastic architecture in western Sicily, with enclosed courtyards and thick masonry walls well suited to archival storage and conservation functions.

The convent is arranged on two main levels around a central cloister with a vaulted walkway supported by stone columns. The former church of Sant’Anna occupies the southern side of the complex, while other spaces originally used by the friars, such as the refectory and service rooms, are grouped around the courtyard. Following its conversion into a state archive, these historic spaces were adapted to accommodate reading rooms, offices, conservation laboratories and an auditorium for public events. The present layout reflects both damage sustained during the twentieth century and later alterations, which restoration projects sought to address while preserving the original architectural structure of the convent.

Adaptation of the complex for archival use prioritised the reuse of existing spaces rather than radical architectural transformation. Restoration and conversion works carried out from 2011 onward focused on structural consolidation, environmental control and accessibility, while maintaining the historic layout of the convent.

== Holdings ==
Despite losses suffered during the Second World War, the Archivio di Stato di Trapani preserves an extensive body of documentation relating to the history of the city and its territory from the late medieval period onward. Its collections include judicial, notarial, administrative, and ecclesiastical records, along with specialised reference materials supporting archival research, which constitute essential sources for the study of Trapani’s urban, social, and institutional development.
