= State Archives of Brindisi =

State archival institution in Brindisi, Italy

- Interactive map of State Archives of Brindisi
- 40°38′29″N 17°56′38″E
- Location: Brindisi, Apulia, Italy
- Type: State archive
- Established: 31 March 1954
- Website: https://archiviodistatobrindisi.cultura.gov.it

The State Archives of Brindisi (Italian: Archivio di Stato di Brindisi) is the state archival institution in Brindisi, Apulia, Italy. It preserves historical records produced by public offices and institutions in the province of Brindisi as part of the national archival network administered by the Ministry of Culture.

The archive is housed in the former convent of Santa Teresa, built in the second half of the 17th century by the Discalced Carmelites. The archives preserve a broad range of historical documents from local administrative, judicial, and ecclesiastical bodies.

== History ==
The State Archives of Brindisi was established as a Section by decree of the Ministry of the Interior on 31 March 1954. Following the reform of 30 September 1963, it was elevated to the status of State Archive. Originally located on Via Porta Lecce, the institution was transferred to Via Cortine in 1965, and to the convent of Santa Teresa in 1990.

== Sources ==
- "Archivio di Stato di Brindisi" (PDF). Guida generale degli Archivi di Stato italiani (in Italian). Vol. I. Rome: Ministero per i beni culturali e ambientali. 1981. pp. 713–730.
- "Archivio di Stato di Brindisi". Sistema informativo degli Archivi di Stato (in Italian). Istituto centrale per gli archivi.
