= State Archives of Trento =

State archival institution in Trento, Italy

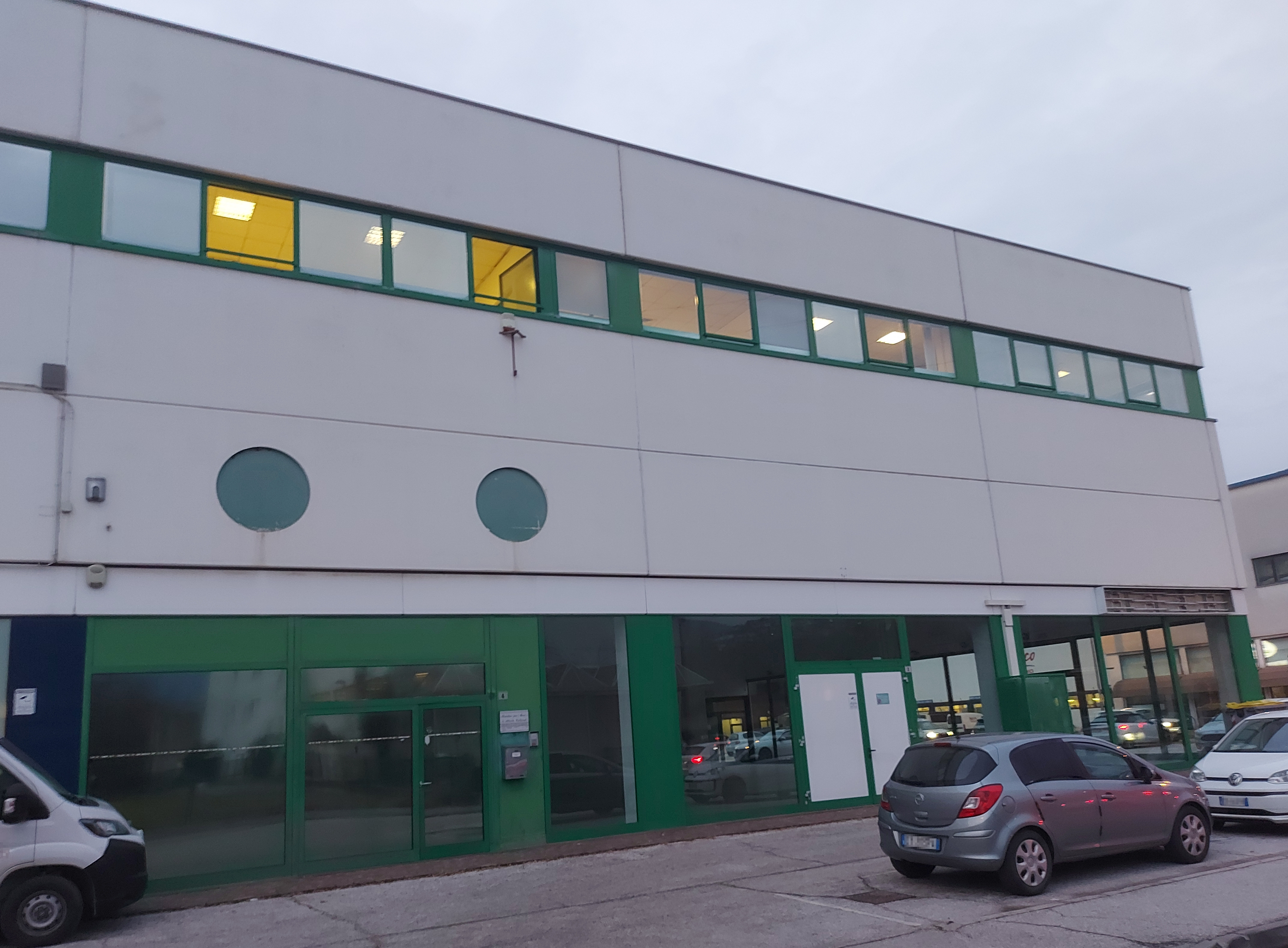
- Interactive map of State Archives of Trento
- 46°05′18″N 11°06′35″E
- Location: Trento, Trentino-Alto Adige, Italy
- Type: State archive
- Website: http://www.archiviodistatotrento.beniculturali.it/

The State Archives of Trento (Italian: Archivio di Stato di Trento) is the state archival institution in Trento, Trentino-Alto Adige, Italy. It preserves historical records produced by public offices and institutions in Trentino as part of the national archival network administered by the Ministry of Culture.

The archives opened on 30 March 1920. They were formally recognized as a State Archive by royal decree on 13 April 1926.

== Sources ==
- "Archivio di Stato di Trento" (PDF). Guida generale degli Archivi di Stato italiani. Vol. IV (S–Z). Rome: Ministero per i beni culturali e ambientali. 1994. pp. 661–726.
- "Archivio di Stato di Trento". Sistema informativo degli Archivi di Stato (in Italian). Istituto centrale per gli archivi.
