= State Archives of Ravenna =

State archival institution in Ravenna, Italy

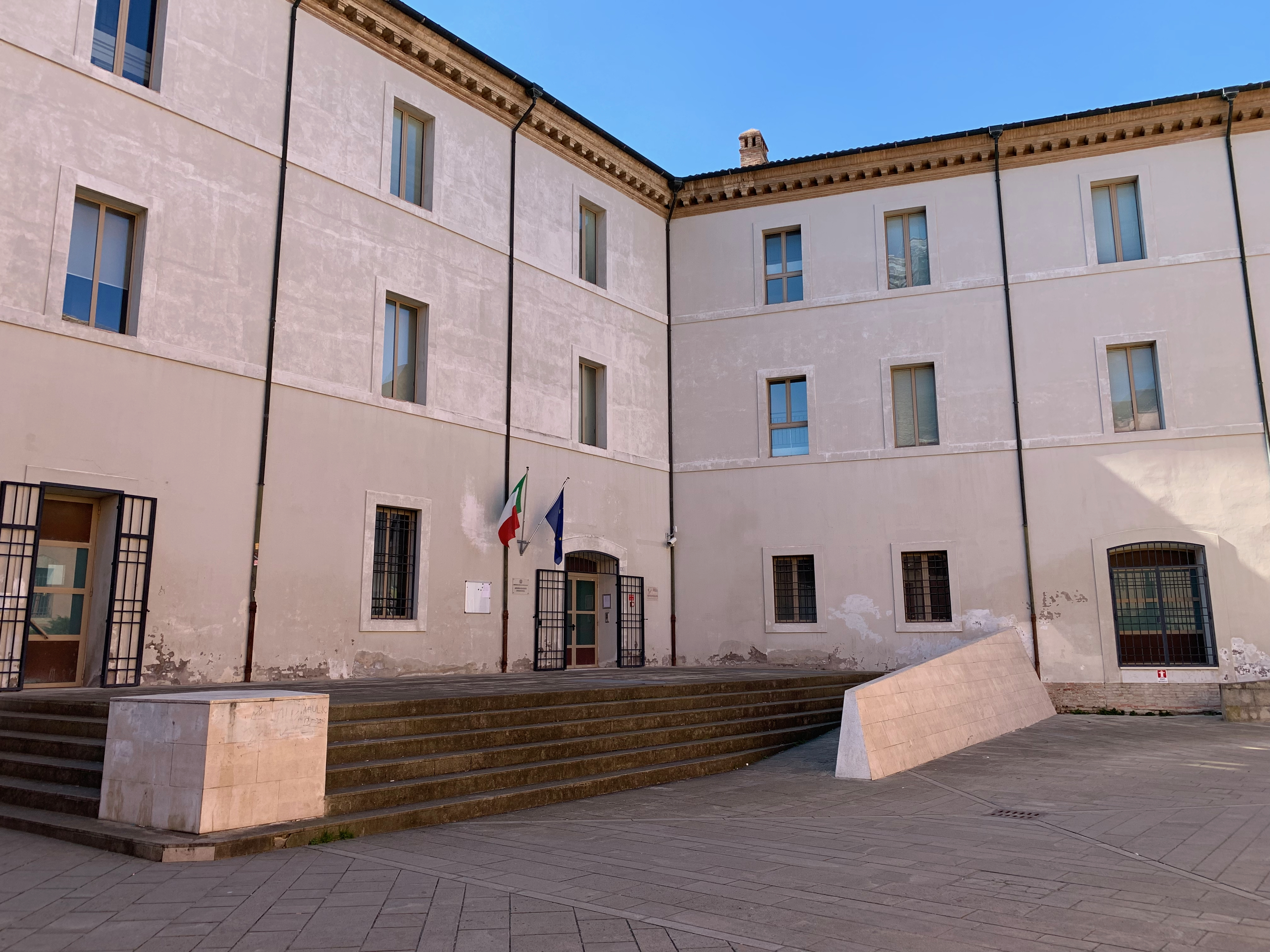
- Interactive map of State Archives of Ravenna
- 44°25′13″N 12°11′43″E
- Location: Ravenna, Emilia-Romagna, Italy
- Type: State archive
- Established: 15 May 1941
- Website: https://archiviodistatoravenna.cultura.gov.it

The State Archives of Ravenna (Italian: Archivio di Stato di Ravenna) is the state archival institution in Ravenna, Emilia-Romagna, Italy. It preserves historical records produced by public offices and institutions in the province of Ravenna as part of the national archival network administered by the Ministry of Culture.

The institution was established as a Section of the State Archives by ministerial decree of 15 May 1941. It was later elevated to the status of a full State Archive following the archival reform of 30 September 1963.

It includes the branch Section of Faenza.

== Sources ==
- "Archivio di Stato di Ravenna" (PDF). Guida generale degli Archivi di Stato italiani (in Italian). Vol. III. Rome: Ministero per i beni culturali e ambientali. 1986. pp. 869–923.
- "Archivio di Stato di Ravenna". Sistema informativo degli Archivi di Stato (in Italian). Istituto centrale per gli archivi.
