= State Archives of Pavia =

State archival institution in Pavia, Italy

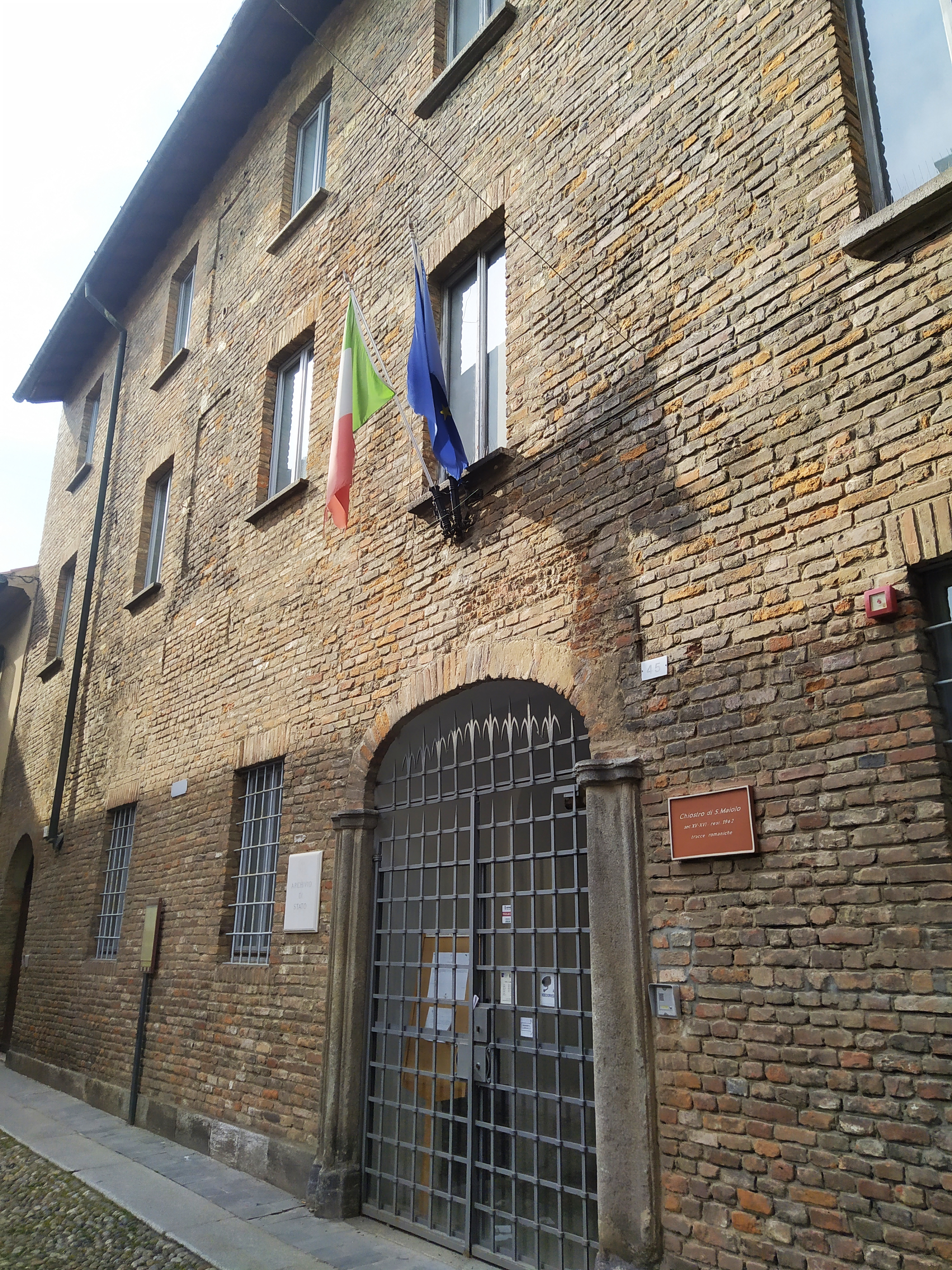
- Interactive map of State Archives of Pavia
- 45°11′01″N 9°09′11″E
- Location: Pavia, Lombardy, Italy
- Type: State archive
- Established: 15 April 1959
- Website: http://www.archiviodistatopavia.beniculturali.it

The State Archives of Pavia (Italian: Archivio di Stato di Pavia) is the state archival institution in Pavia, Lombardy, Italy. It preserves historical records produced by public offices and institutions in the province of Pavia as part of the national archival network administered by the Ministry of Culture.

The institution was established by ministerial decree on 15 April 1959 and opened to the public on 23 June 1962. It is housed in the former monastery of San Maiolo in Via Cardano.

== Sources ==
- "Archivio di Stato di Pavia" (PDF). Guida generale degli Archivi di Stato italiani. Vol. III. Rome: Ministero per i beni culturali e ambientali. 1986. pp. 439–471.
- "Archivio di Stato di Pavia". Sistema informativo degli Archivi di Stato (in Italian). Istituto centrale per gli archivi.
