= State Archives of Bari =

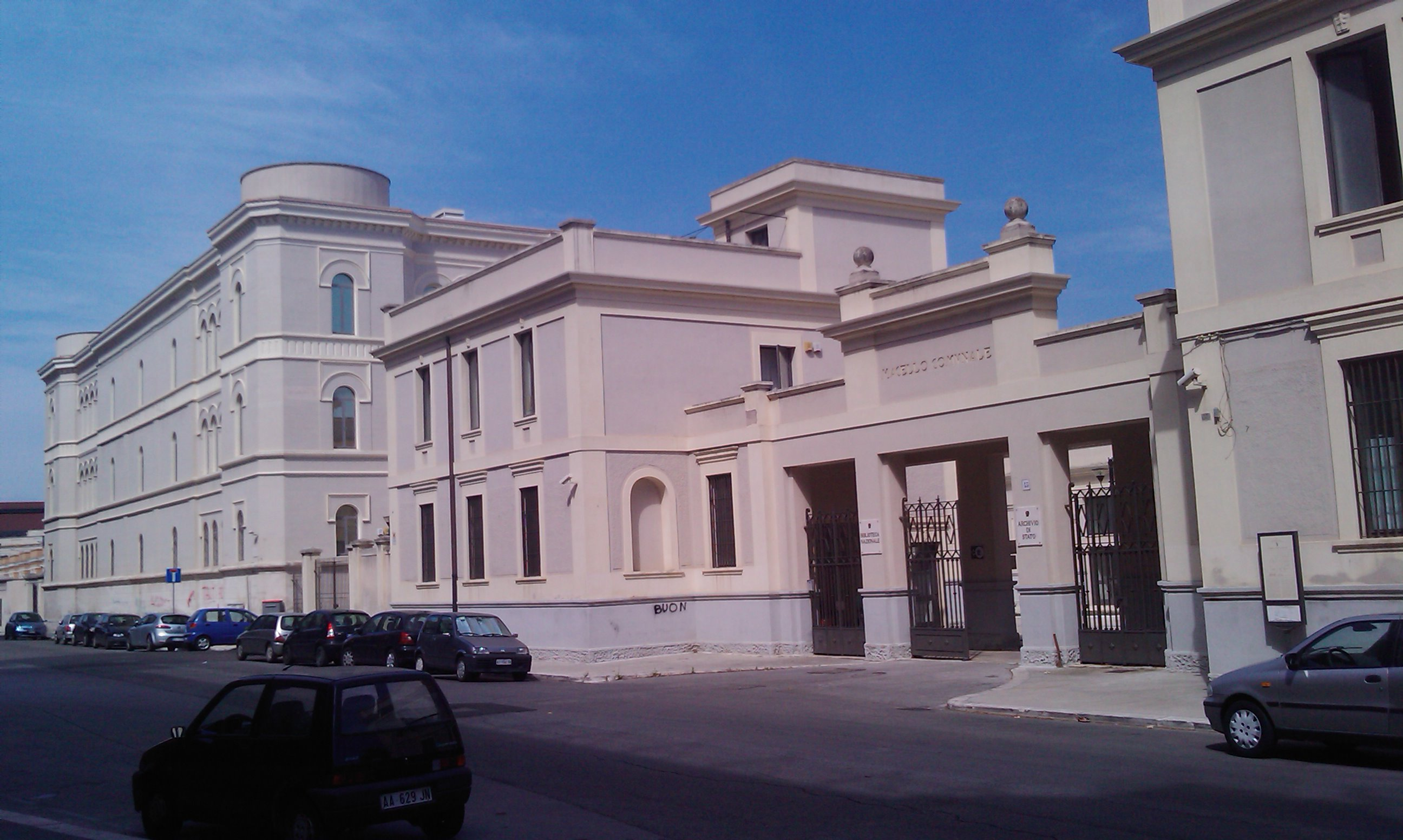
- The Cittadella della Cultura, which has housed the archives since 2007
- Interactive map of State Archives of Bari
- 41.12918216093531°N 16.84733766695474°E
- Alternative name: Archivio di Stato di Bari
- Location: via Pietro Oreste, 45 - Bari, Bari, Italy
- Established: 1812
- Website: http://www.archiviodistatodibari.beniculturali.it/

The State Archives of Bari (Italian: Archivio di Stato di Bari) is the repository of documents and archives of public ownership in the city of Bari, Italy.

It was established as a provincial archive on 22 October 1812, as a result of the decree by Joachim Murat and the subsequent organic law of 1818 on the Archives of the Kingdom. Originally located at the Ospedale degli Svizzeri, in 1831 it was moved to the Palazzo dell'Intendenza. For two years in 1936–37, it was housed at the Palazzo della Provincia.

Since 2007, the archive, together with the Biblioteca nazionale Sagarriga Visconti-Volpi, has been housed at the Cittadella della Cultura. This complex was originally built in the early 20th century as a slaughterhouse and municipal fish market.

The Scuola Statale di Archivistica, Paleografia e Diplomatica has been in operation since 1974, and it carries out training tasks for the technical and scientific staff of the archives' administration. It is also open to external students who hold a secondary school diploma.
