= Timeline of Taranto =

The following is a timeline of the history of the city of Taranto in the Apulia region of Italy.

== Prior to 20th century ==
- 8th C. BCE - "Greeks from Sparta and Laconia took ancient Taras from the Massepicans."
- 212 BCE - Battle of Tarentum (212 BC) fought during the Second Punic War.
- 209 BCE - Battle of Tarentum (209 BC).
- 465 CE - Roman Catholic diocese of Taranto active (approximate date).
- 840 CE - Taranto occupied by Muslims (approximate date).
- 927 - Taranto sacked by Saracens.
- 967 - Nikephoros II Phokas "rebuilds the town".
- 11th C. - Taranto Cathedral
- 1063 - Taranto taken by forces of Norman Robert Guiscard.
- 1088 - Bohemond I of Antioch becomes Prince of Taranto.
- 1301 - Philip I, Prince of Taranto becomes Prince of Taranto.
- 1496 - Castello Aragonese (Taranto) present fortress built.
- 1656 - Plague.
- 1770 - Palazzo Pantaleo built.
- 1861 - Population: 27,484.
- 1864 - Naval Commission designate it as third maritime arsenal.
- 1868 - Taranto railway station opens.
- 1869 - Jonica railway begins operating.
- 1881 - Population: 33,942.
- 1883
  - Ponte di Porta Napoli (bridge) built.
  - Work begins on the maritime arsenal.
- 1886 - Taranto–Brindisi railway begins operating.
- 1887 - Ponte di San Francesco di Paola (bridge) built.
- 1889 - Arsenale militare marittimo di Taranto built.
- 1896 - Palazzo degli Uffici built.

== 20th century ==
- 1901 - Population: 50,592.
- 1911 - Audace Football Club formed.
- 1914 - Cantieri navali Tosi di Taranto (shipyard) begins operating.
- 1921 - Population: 103,807.
- 1922 - Tram begins operating.
- 1923 - Motovelodromo Corvisea (racetrack) opens.
- 1927 - Taranto F.C. 1927 formed.
- 1936 - Population: 127,230.
- 1940 - Battle of Taranto fought during World War II.
- 1947 - Corriere del Giorno newspaper begins publication.
- 1960s - Finsider steelworks "IV Centro" in business in Taranto (approximate date).
- 1965 - Stadio Erasmo Iacovone (stadium) opens.
- 1977 - Ponte Punta Penna Pizzone (bridge) opens.
- 1979 - Quotidiano di Taranto newspaper begins publication.

== 21st century ==
- 2007 - Italian local elections, 2007 held; Ippazio Stefano becomes mayor.
- 2013 - Population: 198,728.

== See also ==
- History of Taranto
- List of mayors of Taranto (in Italian)
- List of bishops of Taranto
- History of Apulia region

Other cities in the macroregion of South Italy:^{(it)}

- Timeline of Bari, Apulia region
- Timeline of Brindisi, Apulia
- Timeline of L'Aquila, Abruzzo region
- Timeline of Naples, Campania region
- Timeline of Reggio Calabria
- Timeline of Salerno, Campania

== Bibliography ==
=== in English ===
- William Smith, ed. (1872) [1854]. "Tarentum". Dictionary of Greek and Roman Geography. London: John Murray. hdl:2027/hvd.ah5cur.
- "Tarentum" . Encyclopædia Britannica. Vol. 23 (9th ed.). 1888. pp. 61–62.
- "Taranto". Chambers's Encyclopaedia. London. 1901. hdl:2027/njp.32101065312959.
- "Taranto", Southern Italy and Sicily (15th ed.), Leipzig: Karl Baedeker, 1908
- Ashby, Thomas (1910). "Taranto" . Encyclopædia Britannica. Vol. 26 (11th ed.). pp. 415–416.
- Benjamin Vincent (1910), "Tarentum", Haydn's Dictionary of Dates (25th ed.), London: Ward, Lock & Co., hdl:2027/uc2.ark:/13960/t41r6xh8t
- Augustus J. C. Hare (1911), "Taranto", Cities of Southern Italy, New York: Dutton
- "Taranto". Italian Port Guide: Bari, Brindisi, Taranto. Navpers ; 15383. Washington, DC: United States Navy Department. 1979. hdl:2027/uiug.30112105110164.
- Roy Domenico (2002). "Apulia: Taranto". Regions of Italy: a Reference Guide to History and Culture. Greenwood. pp. 28+. ISBN 0313307334.

=== in Italian ===
- Giovanni Battista Gagliardo (1811). Descrizione topografica di Taranto. Naples: Angelo Trani.
- Domenico Ludovico De Vincentiis (1878). Storia di Taranto (in Italian).
- "Taranto". Nuova Enciclopedia Italiana (in Italian) (6th ed.). Turin: Unione Tipografico-Editrice Torinese. 1887. hdl:2027/uc1.c2649819.
- Carlo Lozzi (1887). "Storie de'Municipii: Taranto". Biblioteca istorica della antica e nuova Italia (in Italian). Vol. 2. Imola. OCLC 12117233. (bibliography)
- Nicola Bernardini, ed. (1890). "Provincia di Lecce". Guida della stampa periodica italiana (in Italian). Lecce: R. Tipografia editrice salentina dei fratelli Spacciante. hdl:2027/njp.32101074983378. (includes Taranto)
- Touring Club Italiano. "Taranto". Puglie. Guide Regionali Illustrate (in Italian). Capriolo & Massimino. hdl:2027/uc1.c035947291. circa 1900?
- "Taranto", Enciclopedia Italiana (in Italian), 1937
