= Timeline of Reggio Calabria =

The following is a timeline of the history of the city of Reggio Calabria, Italy.

== Prior to 20th century ==
- 8th century BCE - Reghion established by Chalcidian Greeks.
- 386 BCE - Town sacked by forces of Dionysius I of Syracuse.
- 91 BCE - Earthquake.^{(it)}
- 89 BCE - Rhegium becomes a Roman municipium.
- 17 CE - Earthquake.^{(it)}
- 362 CE - Earthquake.^{(it)}
- 410 CE - Reggio sacked by forces of Alaric.
- 458 - Reggio taken by forces of Totila.
- 550 - Roman Catholic diocese of Reggio Calabria established (approximate date).
- 950 - Reggio taken by Muslim forces.
- 1059 - Reggio taken by Norman forces.
- 1783 - Earthquake.
- 1806 - Administrative Distretto di Reggio established.
- 1818
  - Regia Biblioteca Ferdinandiana (library) established.
  - Real Teatro Borbonio (theatre) opens.
- 1852 - Archivio di Calabria Ultra Prima (archives) opens.
- 1860
  - 21 August: Battle of Piazza Duomo; Garibaldian forces win.
  - Circondario di Reggio di Calabria (administrative region) established.
- 1866 - Railway station opens; Reggio Calabria - Lazzaro railway begins operating.
- 1884 - Garibaldi monument erected in the Piazza Garibaldi (Reggio Calabria).
- 1894 - Calabria earthquake of 1894.
- 1895 - Battipaglia–Reggio di Calabria railway begins operating.
- 1896 - Villa comunale Umberto I (park) opens.
- 1897 - Population: 46,399.

== 20th century ==
- 1904 - Corriere di Calabria e di Messina newspaper begins publication.
- 1908 - December: Earthquake.
- 1911 - Population: 43,162.
- 1913 - Scilla Lighthouse built at Castello Ruffo di Scilla near city.
- 1914 - Unione Sportiva Reggio Calabria, a football club, was formed.
- 1918 - Reggio Calabria tram begins operating.
- 1920 - Biblioteca Pietro De Nava (library) active.
- 1921 - Palazzo San Giorgio (Reggio Calabria) built.
- 1922
  - Il Popolo di Calabria newspaper in publication.
  - Politeama Siracusa theatre opens.
- 1931 - Teatro Francesco Cilea (theatre) built.
- 1932 - Stadio Michele Bianchi (stadium) opens.
- 1935 - Tempio della Vittoria (Reggio Calabria) built.
- 1938 - Reggio di Calabria Centrale railway station rebuilt.
- 1939 - Reggio Calabria Airport established.
- 1943 - Bombing of Reggio Calabria (1943) during World War II.
- 1953 - Corriere di Reggio begins publication.
- 1967 - Accademia di Belle Arti di Reggio Calabria (art school) established.
- 1970 - July: Reggio revolt begins.
- 1982 - University of Reggio Calabria active.
- 1999 - Stadio Oreste Granillo (stadium) opens.

== 21st century ==
- 2013 - Population: 180,686.
- 2014 - Giuseppe Falcomatà becomes mayor.

== See also ==
- Reggio Calabria history
- History of Reggio Calabria
- Urban development of Reggio Calabria
- List of mayors of Reggio Calabria
- List of bishops of Reggio Calabria
- Duchy of Calabria
- History of Calabria region

Other cities in the macroregion of South Italy:^{(it)}

- Timeline of Bari, Apulia region
- Timeline of Brindisi, Apulia
- Timeline of L'Aquila, Abruzzo region
- Timeline of Naples, Campania region
- Timeline of Salerno, Campania
- Timeline of Taranto, Apulia

== Bibliography ==
=== in English ===
- William Smith, ed. (1872) [1854]. "Rhegium". Dictionary of Greek and Roman Geography. London: John Murray. hdl:2027/hvd.ah5cur.
- "Reggio", Handbook for Travellers in Southern Italy (8th ed.), London: J. Murray, 1878
- "Reggio". Chambers's Encyclopaedia. London. 1901. hdl:2027/njp.32101065312934.
- Umberto Cassuto (1905), "Reggio", Jewish Encyclopedia, vol. 10, New York, hdl:2027/msu.31293024395141
- "Reggio", Southern Italy and Sicily (15th ed.), Leipzig: Karl Baedeker, 1908
- "Reggio Calabria" . Encyclopædia Britannica. Vol. 23 (11th ed.). 1910. p. 38.
- Benjamin Vincent (1910), "Rhegium", Haydn's Dictionary of Dates (25th ed.), London: Ward, Lock & Co., hdl:2027/uc2.ark:/13960/t41r6xh8t
- Roy Domenico (2002). "Calabria: Reggio di Calabria". Regions of Italy: a Reference Guide to History and Culture. Greenwood. pp. 48+. ISBN 0313307334.

=== in Italian ===
- Girolamo Marafioti (1601). Chroniche et Antichita di Calabria (in Italian). Padua.
- Domenico Spanò Bolani (1857). Storia di Reggio di Calabria (in Italian). Naples: Stamperia e Cartiere del Fibreno.
- "Reggio di Calabria", Nuova Enciclopedia Italiana (in Italian), vol. 19 (6th ed.), Unione tipografico-editrice torinese, 1885, pp. 55–61, hdl:2027/nnc1.cu08476861
- Carlo Lozzi (1887). "Storie de'Municipii: Reggio di Calabria". Biblioteca istorica della antica e nuova Italia (in Italian). Vol. 2. Imola. OCLC 12117233. (bibliography)
- Nicola Bernardini, ed. (1890). "Provincia di Reggio Calabria". Guida della stampa periodica italiana [Guide to Italian Periodicals] (in Italian). Lecce: R. Tipografia editrice salentina dei fratelli Spacciante. hdl:2027/njp.32101074983378.
- Gustavo Strafforello, ed. (1900). "Provincia di Reggio Calabria: Circondario di Reggio Calabria". La Patria: Geografia dell' Italia. Vol. 4. Turin: Unione tipografico-editrice. OCLC 82800910.
- "Reggio di Calabria", Enciclopedia Italiana (Treccani) (in Italian), 1935
- Filippo Aliquò Taverriti (1958). Reggio 1908-1958: Nel cinquantesimo anniversario del terremoto del XXVIII dicembre. OCLC 39709984.
- Vincenzo Larizza (1993). Cronistoria di Reggio Calabria nella seconda guerra mondiale: 1939/1945 (in Italian). OCLC 468513235.
- Ferdinando Cordova (2003). Il fascismo nel Mezzogiorno: le Calabrie. Rubbettino Editore. ISBN 978-88-498-0489-8.
- Nicola Criniti (2007). La stampa politica di Reggio Calabria e provincia: 1860-1926. Rubbettino. ISBN 978-88-498-2142-0.
