= Timeline of Bari =

The following is a timeline of the history of the city of Bari in the Apulia region of Italy.

== Prior to 15th century ==
- 450 – Roman Catholic diocese of Bari established (approximate date).
- 847 – Establishment of Emirate of Bari.
- 852 – Emirate of Bari headquartered in city.
- 871 – Fall of Bari to the forces of the Frankish Emperor Louis and his Lombard and Croatian allies.
- 885 – Bari becomes "residence of the Byzantine governor."
- 1002 – City besieged by "a Sicilian force under Safi."
- 1035 – Cathedral of San Sabino construction begins.
- 1068/71 – Siege of Bari by Norman forces.
- 1087 – Basilica di San Nicola construction begins (approximate date).
- 1095 – Peter the Hermit preaches the First Crusade.
- 1098 – Religious council held in Bari.
- 1136 – City taken by forces of Lothair II, Holy Roman Emperor.
- 1139 – Roger II of Sicily attacked Bari, damaging the city walls.
- 1155 – Manuel I Komnenos in power.
- 1156 – Bari sacked by forces of William I of Sicily.
- 1171 – Cathedral of San Sabino construction completed.
- 1197 – Basilica di San Nicola consecrated.
- 1233 – Castello Normanno-Svevo (Bari) (castle) rebuilt.
- 1292 – Cathedral of San Sabino consecrated.
- 1349 – City besieged by Hungarian and German forces.
- 1399 – Giovanni Bozzuto appointed captain.

== 15th–19th centuries ==
- 1464 – Sforza in power.
- 1500 – Isabella of Aragon, Duchess of Milan in power.
- 1545 – Population: 12,800.
- 1567 – Flood.
- 1558 – Bona Sforza leaves the town to Philip II. of Spain and Naples.
- 1647 – Social unrest.
- 1656 – Plague.
- 1683 – Flood.
- 1690–1692 – Major plague in the province of Bari resulting in the entire region being placed under quarantine.
- 1813 – City development outside the walls begins.
- 1833 – August: Flood.
- 1835 – Archivio di Stato di Bari (state archives) established.
- 1854 – Teatro Piccinni (theatre) opens.
- 1860 – Bari becomes part of the Kingdom of Italy.
- 1861 – Population: 44,572.
- 1864 – Bari Centrale railway station opens.
- 1868 – Bari–Taranto railway in operation.
- 1872 – New Port of Bari development begins.
- 1877 – Biblioteca nazionale Sagarriga Visconti-Volpi (library) opens.
- 1887 – La Gazzetta del Mezzogiorno newspaper begins publication.
- 1897 – Population: 80,450.
- 1900 – Bari-Putignano railway begins operating.

== 20th century ==
- 1901 – Casa editrice Giuseppe Laterza & figli (publisher) in business.
- 1903 – Teatro Petruzzelli (theatre) opens.
- 1905
  - February: Flood.
  - Bari-Casamassima-Putignano railway begins operating.
- 1908 – F.C. Bari 1908 (football club) formed.
- 1911 – Population: 103,670.
- 1914 – Teatro Margherita (Bari) (theatre) opens.
- 1915 – September: Flood.
- 1921 – Population: 136,247.
- 1924 – Università adriatica B. Mussolini founded.
- 1925 – Conservatory of Bari established.
- 1926 – November: Flood.
- 1931 – Ferrovie del Sud Est (transit entity) established.
- 1934 – Bari Airport built.
- 1936
  - Ferrotramviaria (transit entity) established.
  - Population: 197,918.
- 1939 – Trolleybuses in Bari begin operating
- 1943 – Air raid on Bari by German forces in World War II.
- 1951 – Population: 268,183.
- 1965 – Bari–Barletta railway begins operating.
- 1981 – Population: 371,022.
- 1985 – May: Apulian comunal election, 1985 held.
- 1990
  - Part of the 1990 FIFA World Cup football contest held in Bari.
  - Polytechnic University of Bari established.
  - Stadio San Nicola (stadium) opens.

== 21st century ==
- 2008 – Bari metropolitan railway service begins operating.
- 2009 – Bari International Film Festival begins.
- 2013 – Population: 313,213.
- 2014 – Antonio Decaro becomes mayor.
- 2015
  - May: Apulian regional election, 2015 held.
  - Metropolitan City of Bari administration effected.
- 2016 – 12 July: Andria–Corato train collision occurs in vicinity of Bari.

== See also ==
- Bari history
- History of Bari; includes Timeline (in Italian)
- List of mayors of Bari
- List of bishops of Bari
- Duchy of Bari
- History of Apulia (region)

Other cities in the macroregion of South Italy:^{(it)}

- Timeline of Brindisi, Apulia region
- Timeline of L'Aquila, Abruzzo region
- Timeline of Naples, Campania region
- Timeline of Reggio Calabria
- Timeline of Salerno, Campania
- Timeline of Taranto, Apulia

== Bibliography ==
=== in English ===
- "Bari", Southern Italy and Sicily (15th ed.), Leipzig: Karl Baedeker, 1908
- Ashby, Thomas (1910). "Bari (town)" . Encyclopædia Britannica. Vol. 3 (11th ed.). pp. 400–401.
- John W. Barker (2004). "Bari". In Christopher Kleinhenz (ed.). Medieval Italy: an Encyclopedia. Routledge. pp. 94–96. ISBN 0415939291.
- Giulia Bellato (2024). "Bari and political violence in the twelfth century: a case of medieval urbicide". Journal of Architectural Design and History.
- Umberto Benigni (1907). "Bari". Catholic Encyclopedia. Vol. 2. New York.
- Octavian Blewitt (1853), "Bari", Handbook for Travellers in Southern Italy, John Murray, OCLC 2231455
- "Bari". Chambers's Encyclopaedia. London. 1901. hdl:2027/njp.32101065312868.
- Roy Domenico (2002). "Apulia: Bari". Regions of Italy: a Reference Guide to History and Culture. Greenwood. pp. 19+. ISBN 0313307334.
- Richard Gottheil (1902), "Bari", Jewish Encyclopedia, vol. 2, New York, hdl:2027/mdp.49015002282300
- William Smith, ed. (1872) [1854]. "Barium". Dictionary of Greek and Roman Geography. London: John Murray. hdl:2027/hvd.ah5cuq.

=== in Italian ===
- Antonio Beatillo (1886) [1637]. Storia di Bari. stab. tip. Cannone.
- Giulio Petroni. Della storia di Bari. Stamperia e cartiere del Fibreno. 1857–1858
- "Bari delle Puglie". Nuova Enciclopedia Italiana (in Italian). Vol. 3 (6th ed.). Turin: Unione Tipografico-Editrice Torinese. 1877. hdl:2027/uc1.c2649801.
- A. Beatillo. Storia di Bari. 1886
- Nicola Bernardini, ed. (1890). "Provincia di Bari". Guida della stampa periodica italiana (in Italian). Lecce: R. Tipografia editrice salentina dei fratelli Spacciante. hdl:2027/njp.32101074983378.
- F. Carabellese. Bari. Bergamo 1909
- F. Colavecchio. Guida di Bari. 1910
- Saverio La Sorsa. La vita di Bari durante il secolo XIX. Commissione provinciale di archeologia e storia patria [Bari] Documenti e monografie, v. 12, 15. 1913–1915
- "Bari delle Puglie", Enciclopedia Italiana (in Italian), 1930
- Vito Masellis. Storia di Bari dalle origini ai nostri giorni. Italstampa, 1966
- Dino Borri et al. Storia di Bari. Laterza, 1994
- Pietro Mazzeo. Storia di Bari dalle origini alla conquista normanna (1071), Adriatica Editrice, Bari, 2008
