= Timeline of Salerno =

The following is a timeline of the history of the city of Salerno in the Campania region of Italy.

== Prior to 20th century ==
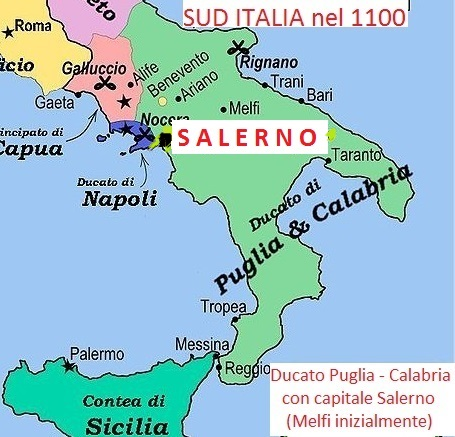
Salerno capital of Normans' southern Italy in 1100

- 197 BCE - Roman colony Salernum founded at site of former Etruscan town Irnthi.^{(it)}
- 79 CE - Salerno was buried by the rain of ash and debris of the eruption of Vesuvius that razed Pompeii and Herculaneum to the ground
- 5th-7th C. CE - Roman Catholic diocese of Salerno established.
- 646 CE - Salerno becomes part of the Lombard Duchy of Benevento.
- 774 CE - Duke Arechis II of Benevento relocates to Salerno.
- 9th C. - Schola Medica Salernitana (medical school) founded.
- 851 - Principality of Salerno established. List of princes of Salerno.
- 870s - Salerno besieged by Arab forces.
- 1076 - Salerno taken by forces of Norman Robert Guiscard.
- 1084 - Saint Matthew Cathedral consecrated by Pope Gregory VII.
- 1150 - University founded.
- 1194 - Salerno sacked by forces of Henry VI, Holy Roman Emperor.
- 1260 - Port of Salerno construction begins.
- 1419 - Salerno becomes part of the Kingdom of Naples and administrative centre of its Principato Citeriore.
- 1578 - Salerno sacked by "Muslim pirates."
- 1656 - Plague.
- 1688 - Earthquake.
- 1694 - Earthquake.
- 1799 - Salerno becomes part of the French client Parthenopean Republic.
- 1817 - University closed.
- 1843 - Biblioteca Provinciale di Salerno (library) founded.
- 1860 - Circondario di Salerno (administrative region) established.
- 1866 - Naples–Salerno railway begins operating; Salerno railway station opens.
- 1872 - Teatro municipale Giuseppe Verdi (Salerno) opens.
- 1875 - Frusta newspaper begins publication.
- 1895 - Salerno–Reggio Calabria railway in operation.
- 1896 - L'Eco newspaper begins publication.
- 1897 - Population: 37,310.

== 20th century ==
- 1902 - Ferrovia Salerno-Mercato San Severino (railway) begins operating.
- 1911 - Population: 45,682.
- 1919 - U.S. Salernitana 1919 (football club) formed.
- 1920 - Società salernitana di storia patria (history society) founded.
- 1926 - Salerno Costa d'Amalfi Airport established.
- 1936 - Population: 67,186.^{(it)}
- 1937 - Salerno trolleybus begins operating.
- 1943 - 9 September: Salerno besieged by Allied forces during World War II.
- 1944 - Salerno is Capital of Italy for some months
  - February: Governo Badoglio I & II headquartered in Salerno during the Periodo costituzionale transitorio.
  - April: Communist policy announcement made in Salerno.
- 1946 - Festival del cinema di Salerno begins.
- 1954 - 25 October: Salerno flood.
- 1956 - Local election held; Alfonso Menna becomes mayor (until 1970).
- 1961 - Population: 117,363.^{(it)}
- 1964 - Azienda Trasporti Autofiloviari Consorzio Salernitano (transit entity) formed.
- 1968 - University of Salerno established.
- 1971 - Population: 155,498.^{(it)}
- 1982 - 26 August: Salerno massacre occurs in the Torrione (Salerno) quartiere.
- 1990 - Stadio Arechi (stadium) opens.
- 1993 - Vincenzo De Luca becomes mayor.
- 1998 - Parco del Mercatello (park) opens.

== 21st century ==
- 2013
  - Salerno metropolitan railway service begins operating.
  - Population: 131,925.
- 2016 - Vincenzo Napoli becomes mayor.

== See also ==
- History of Salerno
- List of mayors of Salerno
- List of Princes of Salerno, 9th-16th centuries
- List of bishops of Salerno
- State Archives of Salerno (state archives)
- Campania history (region)

Other cities in the macroregion of South Italy:^{(it)}

- Timeline of Bari, Apulia region
- Timeline of Brindisi, Apulia
- Timeline of L'Aquila, Abruzzo region
- Timeline of Naples, Campania region
- Timeline of Reggio Calabria
- Timeline of Taranto, Apulia

== Bibliography ==
=== in English ===
- William Henry Overall, ed. (1870). "Salerno". Dictionary of Chronology. London: William Tegg. hdl:2027/uc2.ark:/13960/t9m32q949.
- William Smith, ed. (1872) [1854]. "Salernum". Dictionary of Greek and Roman Geography. London: John Murray. hdl:2027/hvd.ah5cur.
- Ashby, Thomas (1910). "Salerno" . Encyclopædia Britannica. Vol. 24 (11th ed.). p. 66.
- "Salerno", Southern Italy and Sicily (16th ed.), Leipzig: Karl Baedeker, 1912
- Roy Domenico (2002). "Campania: Salerno". Regions of Italy: a Reference Guide to History and Culture. Greenwood. pp. 72+. ISBN 0313307334.
- Christopher Kleinhenz, ed. (2004). "Salerno". Medieval Italy: an Encyclopedia. Routledge. ISBN 0415939291.

=== in Italian ===
- "Salerno", Nuova Enciclopedia Italiana (in Italian), vol. 19 (6th ed.), 1885
- Mario Baratta [in Italian] (1901). "Distribuzione topografica dei terremoti italiani: Salernitano e Basilicata: Salerno". I terremoti d'Italia [Earthquakes in Italy] (in Italian). Turin: Fratelli Bocca. (also includes chronology)
- "Salerno", Enciclopedia Italiana (Treccani) (in Italian), 1936
