= Timeline of Brindisi =

The following is a timeline of the history of the city of Brindisi in the Apulia region of Italy.

== Prior to 15th century ==
- 266 BCE – Romans in power.
- 244 BCE – Brundisium becomes a Roman colony.
- 190 BCE – Appian Way (Rome-Brundisium) built (approximate date).
- 49 BCE – The Siege of Brundisium occurs during Caesar's civil war. Caesar fails to prevent Pompey from crossing the Adriatic Sea.
- 40 BCE - The Treaty of Brundisium is signed after skirmishes between troops of Octavian and Mark Antony. The treaty places the western Roman territory in Gaul and Illyricum under Octavian influence.
- 38 BCE – "Foedus brundissinum, a brief reconciliation between Mark Antony and Octavian" takes place in Brundisium.
- 19 BCE – 21 September: Poet Virgil dies in Brundisium.
- 109 CE – Via Traiana (Beneventum-Brundisium road) built.
- 5th–6th C. CE – Roman Catholic diocese of Brindisi established.
- 7th C. CE – Lombards in power.
- 836 – Brindisi sacked by Saracens.
- 867 – Brindisi taken by forces of Louis II of Italy.
- 1071 – Normans in power.
- 1080 – Chiesa di San Benedetto (Brindisi) (church) built.
- 1089 – Brindisi Cathedral dedicated.
- 1192 – Fontana Tancredi (fountain) installed.
- 1225 – Wedding of Frederick II, Holy Roman Emperor and Isabella II of Jerusalem.
- 1227 – Castello svevo (Brindisi) (castle) built.
- 1230 – Chiesa del Cristo (Brindisi) (church) built.
- 1310 – Chiesa di Santa Maria del Casale (church) built.
- 1322 – Chiesa di San Paolo eremita (church) built.
- 1348 – Plague.
- 1352 – Brindisi sacked by forces of Louis I of Hungary.
- 1383 – Brindisi sacked by forces of Louis I, Duke of Anjou.
- 1385 – Raimondo Del Balzo Orsini in power.

== 15th–19th centuries ==
- 1456 – 1456 Central Italy earthquakes.
- 1496 – Venetians in power.
- 1509 – Venetian rule ends.
- 1528 – One of Brindisi's Roman columns collapses.
- 1734 - Francisco José de Ovando, 1st Marquis of Brindisi captures the castle of Brindisi.
- 1743 – 1743 Salento earthquake.
- 1860
  - Brindisi becomes part of the Kingdom of Italy.
  - Circondario di Brindisi (provincial district) established.
- 1861 – Population: 9,137.^{(it)}
- 1865 – Brindisi railway station opens.
- 1866 – Adriatic railway (Lecce-Brindisi) begins operating.
- 1870
  - Peninsular & Oriental Steam Navigation Company adds Brindisi to its route.
  - Brindisi Marittima railway station opened (closed in 2006).
- 1871 – Population: 13,755.
- 1881 – Population: 16,618.^{(it)}
- 1886 – Taranto–Brindisi railway begins operating.
- 1892 – Indipendente newspaper begins publication.
- 1898 – Peninsular & Oriental Steam Navigation Company deletes Brindisi from its route.

== 20th century ==
- 1901 – Population: 25,317.
- 1905 – Harbour railway station built.
- 1911 – Population: 25,692.^{(it)}
- 1912 – F.B. Brindisi 1912 (football club) formed.
- 1916 – Idroscalo di Brindisi (seaplane base) built in the Port of Brindisi.
- 1923 – Brindisi – Salento Airport built.
- 1927 – Administrative Province of Brindisi formed.
- 1931 – Monumento ai caduti della prima guerra mondiale (Brindisi) (war monument) erected.
- 1933 – Monumento al Marinaio d'Italia erected.
- 1934 - Brindisi Airport commercial flights start.
- 1936 – Population: 41,699.^{(it)}
- 1943 – September: Italian prime minister Badoglio and king Victor Emmanuel flee to Brindisi from Rome after the Armistice of Cassibile during World War II.
- 1944 – February: Administrative seat of national government relocated from Brindisi to Salerno.
- 1961 – Population: 70,657.^{(it)}
- 1963 – Archivio di Stato di Brindisi (state archives) established.
- 1969 – Azienda Municipalizzata Autotrasporti Brindisi (transit entity) formed.
- 1979 – Quotidiano di Brindisi newspaper begins publication.
- 1991 – Population: 95,383.^{(it)}

== 21st century ==
- 2006 – Teatro Verdi (Brindisi) (theatre) opens.
- 2012 – 19 May: Brindisi school bombing.
- 2013 – Population: 88,611.
- 2016 – June: Local election held; Angela Carluccio becomes mayor.
- 2018 – June: Local election held; Riccardo Rossi becomes mayor.

== See also ==
- History of Brindisi
- Urban development of Brindisi
- List of mayors of Brindisi
- List of bishops of Brindisi
- History of Apulia region

Other cities in the macroregion of South Italy:^{(it)}

- Timeline of Bari, Apulia region
- Timeline of L'Aquila, Abruzzo region
- Timeline of Naples, Campania region
- Timeline of Reggio Calabria
- Timeline of Salerno, Campania
- Timeline of Taranto, Apulia

== Bibliography ==
=== in English ===
- William Smith, ed. (1872) [1854]. "Brundisium". Dictionary of Greek and Roman Geography. London: John Murray. hdl:2027/hvd.ah5cuq – via HathiTrust.
- "Brindisi". Chambers's Encyclopaedia. London. 1901 – via Internet Archive.
- "Brindisi", Southern Italy and Sicily (15th ed.), Leipzig: Karl Baedeker, 1908
- Ashby, Thomas (1910). "Brindisi" . Encyclopædia Britannica. Vol. 4 (11th ed.). pp. 571–572.
- Benjamin Vincent (1910), "Brundisium", Haydn's Dictionary of Dates (25th ed.), London: Ward, Lock & Co., hdl:2027/uc2.ark:/13960/t41r6xh8t
- Italian Port Guide: Bari, Brindisi, Taranto. Navpers ; 15383. Washington, DC: United States Navy Department. 1979. hdl:2027/uiug.30112105110164.
- Roy Domenico (2002). "Apulia: Brindisi". Regions of Italy: a Reference Guide to History and Culture. Greenwood. pp. 23+. ISBN 0313307334.
- John W. Barker (2004). "Brindisi". In Christopher Kleinhenz (ed.). Medieval Italy: an Encyclopedia. Routledge. pp. 157–158. ISBN 0415939291.

=== in Italian ===
- A. Della Monaca. Memoria historica dell’antichissima e fedelissima città di Brindisi (Lecce 1674)
- A. De Leo. Dell’antichissima città di Brindisi e suo celebre porto (Naples, 1846)
- "Brindisi". Nuova Enciclopedia Italiana (in Italian). Vol. 4 (6th ed.). Turin: Unione Tipografico-Editrice Torinese. 1877. hdl:2027/uc1.c2649802.
- F. Ascoli. La storia di Brindisi (Rimini 1886)
- Henry Berger, ed. (1899), "Giornali Italiani (per ordine di localita): Brindisi", Annuario della stampa italiana (in Italian), Milan
- Touring Club Italiano. "Brindisi". Puglie. Guide Regionali Illustrate (in Italian). Capriolo & Massimino. hdl:2027/uc1.c035947291. circa 1900?
- Guerrieri (1901). Gli Ebrei a Brindisi e a Lecce. Turin.
- "Brindisi", Enciclopedia Italiana (Treccani) (in Italian), 1930
- R. Alaggio. Brindisi medievale. Natura, Santi e Sovrani in una città di frontiera (Naples, 2009)
