= Timeline of L'Aquila =

The following is a timeline of the history of the city of L'Aquila in the Abruzzo, a region of Italy.

== Prior to 20th century ==
- 1240 – Settlement founded by Frederick II, Holy Roman Emperor (approximate date).
- 1257 – Roman Catholic diocese of L'Aquila active.
- 1259 – Town sacked by forces of Manfred, King of Sicily.
- 1266 – Rebuilding of town by Charles I of Naples begins.
- 1272
  - Walls of L'Aquila construction begins.
  - Fontana delle 99 cannelle (fountain) built.
- 1288 – Santa Maria di Collemaggio church consecrated near town.
- 1300 – Cathedral of San Massimo construction begins (approximate date).
- 1308 – Chiesa di Santa Maria Paganica (church) built.
- 1309 – Chiesa di San Domenico (L'Aquila) (church) construction begins.
- 1315 – Earthquake.^{(it)}
- 1349 – Earthquake.^{(it)}
- 1423 – War of L'Aquila begins.
- 1461 – Earthquake of L'Aquila of 1461.
- 1469 – Santa Maria del Soccorso church construction begins.^{(it)}
- 1472 – Basilica of San Bernardino built.
- 1482 – Printing press in operation.
- 1510 – Palazzo Carli Benedetti built (approximate date).
- 1517 – Mausoleum of Pope Celestine V built in the Santa Maria di Collemaggio church.
- 1521 – Spaniards in power.
- 1534 – Forte Spagnolo (fort) built.
- 1596 - L'aquilanum Collegium founded.
- 1646 – Earthquake.
- 1647 – Oratorio di Sant'Antonio dei Cavalieri de' Nardis consecrated.
- 1657 – Plague outbreak.
- 1703 – 14 January: Earthquake.
- 1713 - Santa Maria del Suffragio construction begins.
- 1719 – Accademia degli Arcadi Colonia Aternina founded.
- 1725 – Chiesa di Sant'Agostino (L'Aquila) (church) built.
- 1743 – Palazzo Ardinghelli built.
- 1745 – Santa Caterina Martire church built (approximate date).^{(it)}
- 1756 – Palazzo Centi built (approximate date).
- 1775 – Santa Maria del Suffragio church completed.
- 1786 – Earthquake.^{(it)}
- 1799 – L'Aquila sacked by French forces.
- 1875 – L'Aquila railway station opens; Sulmona-L'Aquila railway begins operating.
- 1876 – Roman Catholic Archdiocese of L'Aquila established.
- 1897 – Population: 21,202.

== 20th century ==
- 1901 - Population: 21,261.
- 1922 – Ferrovia L'Aquila-Capitignano (railway) begins operating.
- 1927 – L'Aquila Calcio 1927 (football club) formed.
- 1934 – Funivia del Gran Sasso d'Italia (cable car) begins operating.
- 1950 – Museo Nazionale d'Abruzzo (museum) established.
- 1952 – Istituto Universitario di Magistero and Alpine Botanical Garden of Campo Imperatore established.
- 1966 – Tullio De Rubeis becomes mayor.
- 1968 – L'Aquila–Preturo Airport built.
- 1969 – Accademia di Belle Arti dell'Aquila (school) established.
- 1984 – Traforo del Gran Sasso (road tunnel) opens near city.
- 1990 – Italian Society for General Relativity and Gravitation founded.
- 1991 – Gran Sasso e Monti della Laga National Park in vicinity of L'Aquila.
- 1998 – Local election held; Biagio Tempesta becomes mayor.

== 21st century ==
- 2007 – Local election held; Massimo Cialente becomes mayor.
- 2009
  - 6 April: 2009 L'Aquila earthquake.
  - July: International 35th G8 summit held in L'Aquila.
- 2013 – Population: 68,304.
- 2016 – Stadio Gran Sasso d'Italia-Italo Acconcia (stadium) opens.
- 2017 - Basilica di Collemaggio reopened.

== See also ==
- History of L'Aquila
- Cronache aquilane (medieval city history)
- List of mayors of L'Aquila
- List of bishops of L'Aquila
- History of Abruzzo region

Other cities in the macroregion of South Italy:^{(it)}

- Timeline of Bari, Apulia region
- Timeline of Brindisi, Apulia
- Timeline of Naples, Campania region
- Timeline of Reggio Calabria
- Timeline of Salerno, Campania
- Timeline of Taranto, Apulia

== Bibliography ==
=== in English ===
- "Aquila (city)" . Encyclopædia Britannica. Vol. 2 (11th ed.). 1910. p. 249.
- Augustus J. C. Hare (1911), "Aquila", Cities of Southern Italy, New York: Dutton
- "Aquila", Southern Italy and Sicily (16th ed.), Leipzig: Karl Baedeker, 1912
- Roy Domenico (2002). "Abruzzo: L'Aquila". Regions of Italy: a Reference Guide to History and Culture. Greenwood. pp. 6+. ISBN 0313307334.

=== in Italian ===
- Matilde Oddo Bonafede (1888). Guida della città dell'Aquila. Tipografia Aternina.
- Nicola Bernardini, ed. (1890). "Provincia di Aquila". Guida della stampa periodica italiana (in Italian). Lecce: R. Tipografia editrice salentina dei fratelli Spacciante. hdl:2027/njp.32101074983378.
- Mario Baratta (1901). "Distribuzione topografica dei terremoti italiani: Abruzzo: Aquila". I terremoti d'Italia [Earthquakes in Italy] (in Italian). Turin: Fratelli Bocca. (includes chronology)
- "L'Aquila", Enciclopedia Italiana (Treccani) (in Italian), 1929
- L. Serra. Aquila (Bergamo, 1929)
- G. Spagnesi and P. L. Properzi. L’Aquila: Problemi di forma e storia della città (Bari, 1972)
- M. Ruggiero Petrignani. Egemonia politica e forma urbana: L’Aquila, città come fabbrica di potere e di consenso nel medioevo italiano (Bari, 1980)
- S. Gizzi (1983), "La città dell'Aquila: Fondazione e preesistenze", Storia della Città, vol. 28
- A. Clementi and E. Piroddi. L’Aquila, Le città nella storia d’Italia (Rome, 1986)
