= Timeline of Naples =

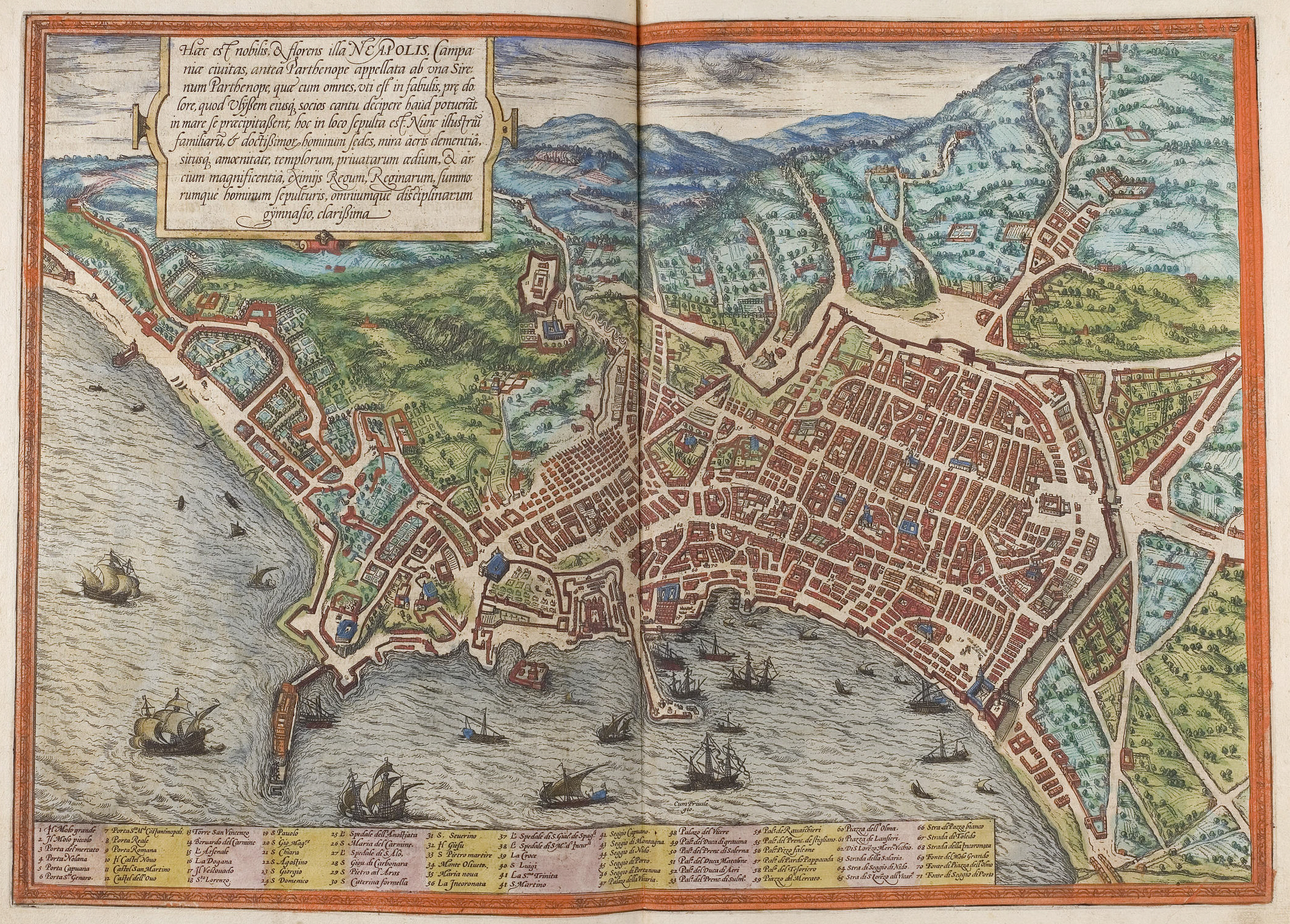
Map of Naples, 1572

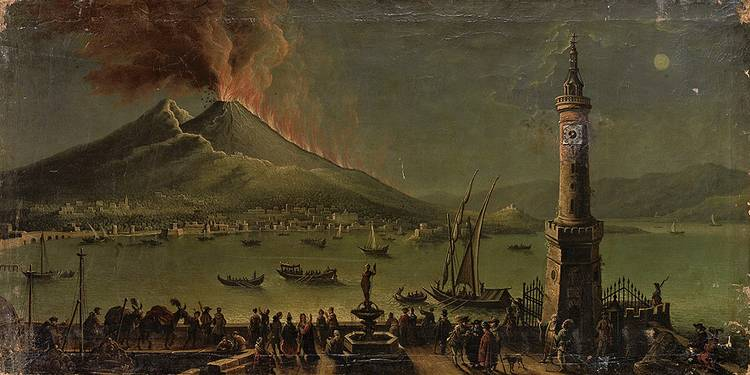
An 18th-century painting depicting an eruption of Mount Vesuvius.

The following is a timeline of the history of the city of Naples. The Naples area has been inhabited since the Neolithic period. The earliest historical sources in the area were left by the Myceneans in the 2nd millennium BC. During its long history, Naples has been captured, destroyed and attacked many times. The city has seen earthquakes, volcanic eruptions, foreign invasions and revolutions.

== Prior to 12th century ==
- 2nd millennium BC – first Mycenaean settlements established in the Naples area (Afragola).
- 8th C. BCE – Kyme (Cumae), established an epineion (out-port) named Parthenope.
- 6th C.BCE – Parthenope was refounded as Neapolis.
- 327 BCE – Naples makes an alliance with Rome, and enters its sphere of influence.
- 37 BCE – Crypta Neapolitana built (approximate date).
- 45 CE - Birth of Statius a poet, he also lived in Naples.
- 79 CE – Big eruption of Vesuvius: many towns near Naples are destroyed (Pompeii, Herculaneum, etc.).
- 190 CE – Catholic Diocese of Naples established (approximate date).
- 3rd C. CE – Catacombs of San Gennaro in use.
- ca.511 CE – The last Western Roman Emperor, Romulus Augustulus, dies in Naples.
- 536 CE – Siege and capture of Naples by the Byzantines.
- 542–543 CE – Siege and capture of Naples by the Goths.
- 615 – Rebellion.
- 638 – Duchy of Naples created.
- 763 – Naples becomes an independent duchy.
- 830s – Naples is threatened by Sicard of Benevento.
- 10th C. – Roman Catholic Archdiocese of Naples established.
- 902 – After numerous assaults, the Neapolitans defeat the Saracens on the Garigliano River.

== 12th–16th centuries ==
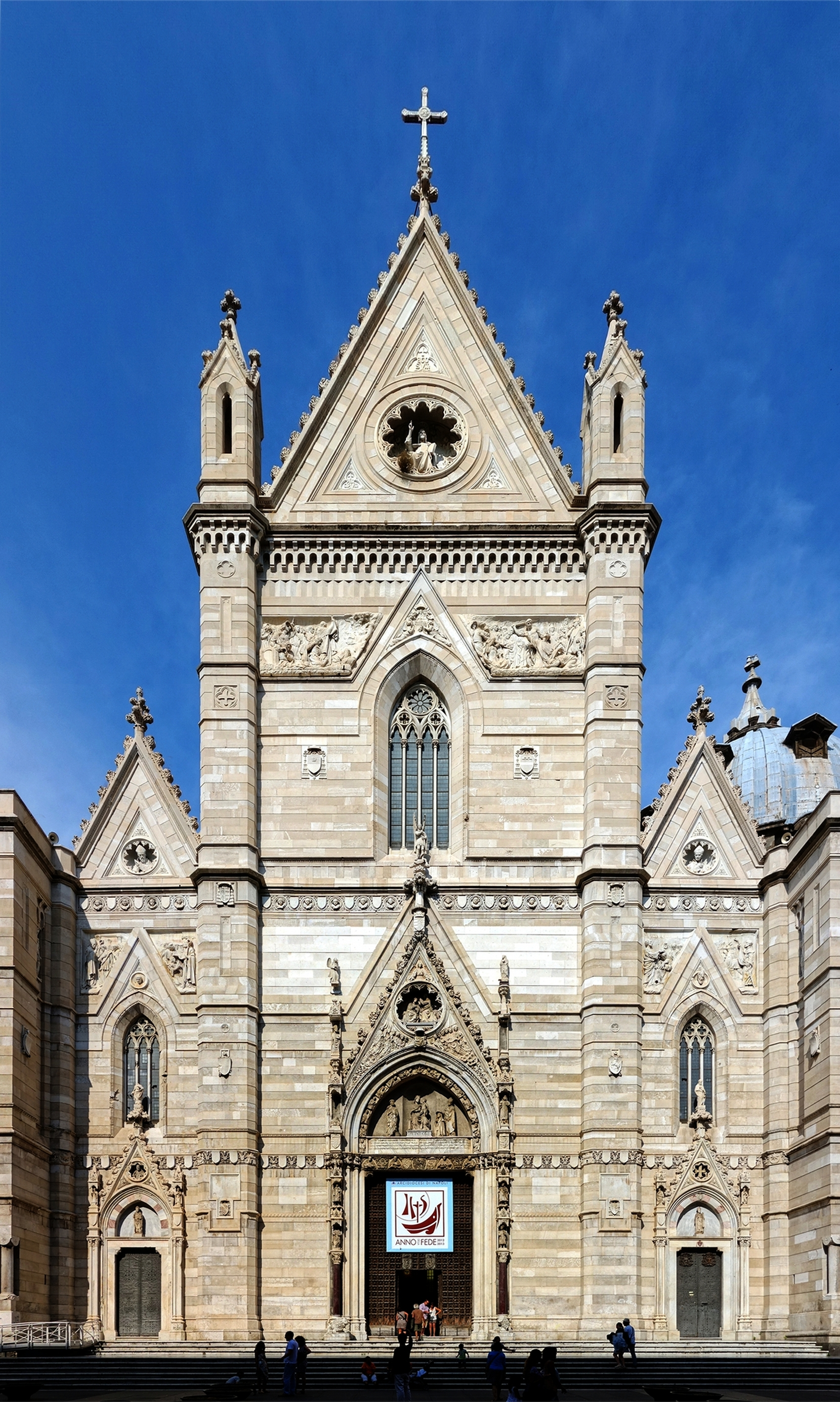
Naples Cathedral was built in 1313

- 1027-30 - Pandulf IV of Capua in power.
- 12th C. - Castel Capuano built.
- 1139 – Ruggiero the Norman enters in the city.
- 1165 – The first castle of Naples: Castel Capuano.
- 1191 – Naples manages to resist the Swabians after a siege from May to August. Empress Constance is imprisoned in Castel dell'Ovo after captured by Sicilians until 1192.
- 1194 – Naples is conquered by the Swabians.
- 1224 – University founded.
- 1266 – Charles of Anjou in power. Naples becomes the capital of the Kingdom of Sicily.
- 1282 – Castel Nuovo built.
- 1309 – Robert of Anjou is proclaimed King of Naples.
- 1313 – Naples Cathedral built.
- 1340 – Santa Chiara built.
- 1343
  - Sant'Elmo expanded.
  - Tsunami.
- 1349 – Earthquake.
- 1368 – Certosa di San Martino inaugurated.
- 1382 – Argonauts of Saint Nicholas instituted.
- 1438 – Renato of Anjou is the king of Naples.
- 1442 – Alfonso V of Aragon conquers Naples. Naples became the capital of the Crown of Aragon.
- 1471 – Printing press in operation.
- 1485 – Ferrante I of Naples prevents the revolt of the Barons.
- 1487 – Villa Poggio Reale construction begun by Alfonso II
- 1495 – Charles VIII of France conquers Naples.
- 1503 – Naples added to the Spanish Empire.
- 1528 – Siege of Naples.
- 1532 – Don Pedro de Toledo is the new Viceroy; he promotes the expansion of the city.
- 1550 – La Commedia theatre built (approximate date).
- 1560 – Academia Secretorum Naturae (learned society) formed.
- 1564 - Sant'Antonio delle Monache a Port'Alba built.

== 17th century ==
- 1600 – Royal Palace of Naples construction begins.
- 1620 – Teatro San Bartolomeo (theatre) built.
- 1631 – Big eruption of Vesuvius, many little towns near Naples are destroyed.
- 1636 – Ponte di Chiaia built.
- 1639 – Treaty of Naples signed between Poland and Spain.
- 1647 – Rebellion against the king (Philip III) and his viceroys; Neapolitan Republic created and later suppressed.

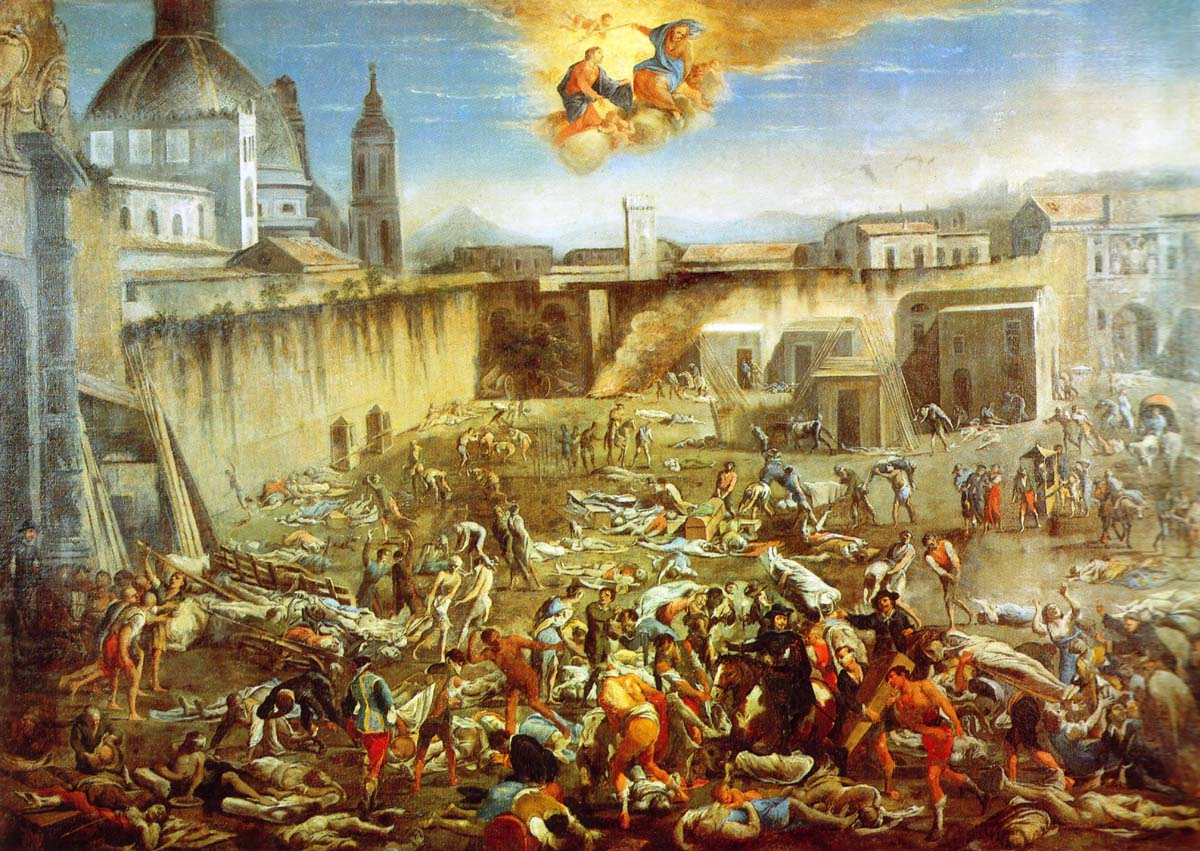
Contemporary engraving of Naples during the Naples Plague in 1656

- 1650
  - Spire of San Gennaro erected
  - Performance of opera Didone.
  - Naples with about 400,000 people becomes the largest cities of the Spanish Empire.
- 1654 – Archbishop's Palace expanded.
- 1656
  - Plague.
  - Fontanelle cemetery established.
- 1667 – San Gennaro dei Poveri founded.
- 1694 – 28 January: Premiere of Alessandro Scarlatti's opera Pirro e Demetrio.

== 18th century ==
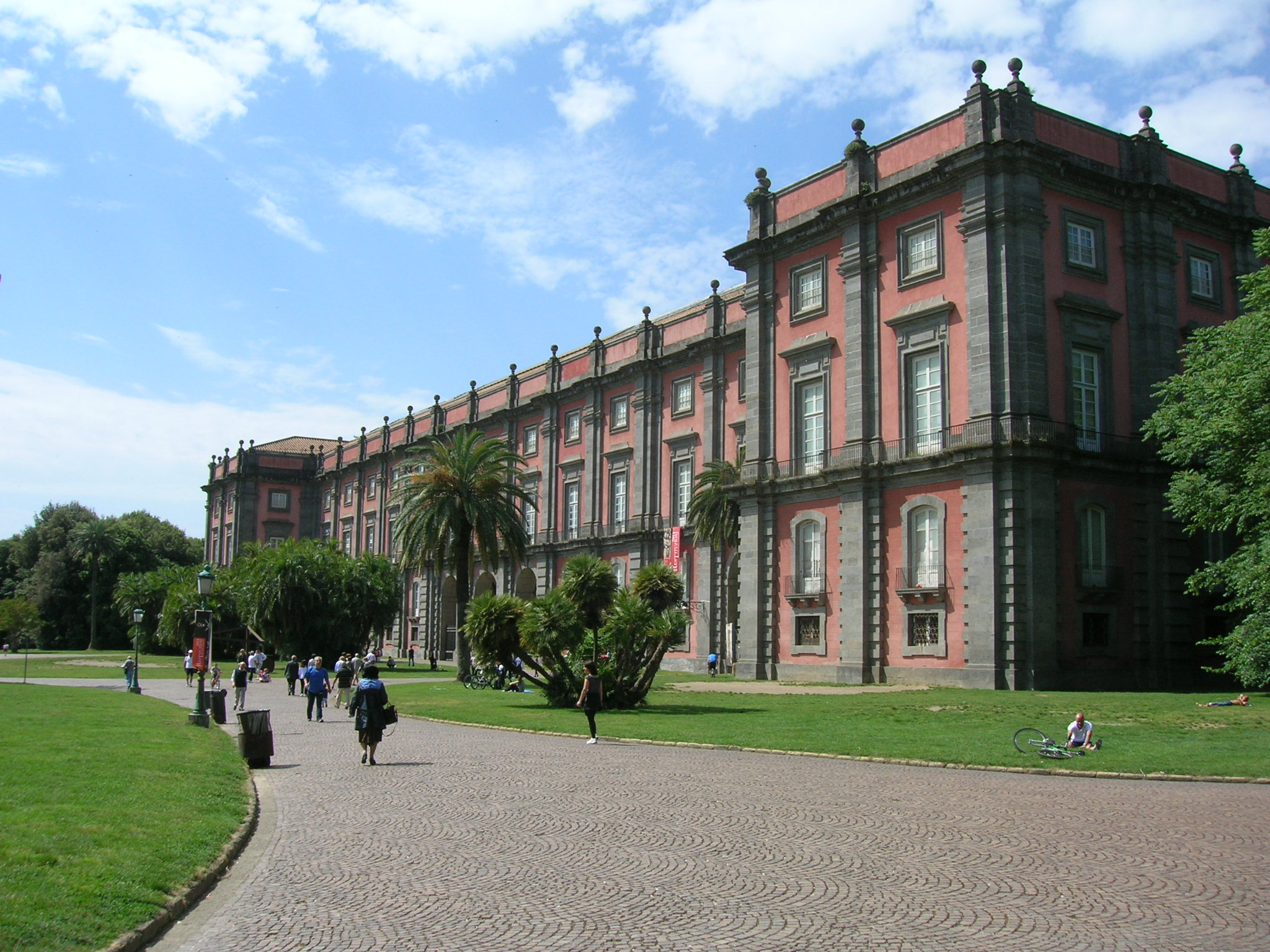
The Palace of Capodimonte was built in 1742

- 1701 – Conspiracy of Macchia.
- 1707 – Naples is conquered by the Austrians.
- 1730 – Palazzo Serra di Cassano built.
- 1732 – Chinese Institute founded.
- 1734 – Charles of Bourbon is proclaimed King of Naples.
- 1737
  - Teatro di San Carlo inaugurated.
  - Spire of San Domenico erected.
- 1738 – Re-discovery of Herculaneum.
- 1742 – Palace of Capodimonte built.
- 1743 – Capodimonte porcelain manufactory established.
- 1750 – Spire of the Immaculate Virgin erected.
- 1759 – Charles VII is succeeded by Ferdinand IV.
- 1751 – Ospedale L'Albergo Reale dei Poveri construction begins.
- 1757 – Museo di Capodimonte opens.
- 1778 – Palazzo Doria d'Angri built.
- 1779 – Teatro del Real Fondo di Separazione opens.
- 1780 - Villa Comunale built.
- 1790's - Biblioteca Nazionale Vittorio Emanuele III founded.
- 1790 – Teatro San Ferdinando built.
- 1799 – Parthenopean Republic and Army of Naples formed.

== 19th century ==
- 1804 – Reale Biblioteca di Napoli opens.
- 1805 – Anglo-Russian invasion.
- 1806 – Napoleon grants the Kingdom of Naples to his brother Joseph.
- 1807 – Botanical Garden established.
- 1808 – Gioacchin Murat is the new King of Naples. He promotes administrative reforms and public works.
- 1811 – Zoological Museum founded.
- 1815 – Naples is against the Austrian Empire. The intervention by Austria caused resentment in Italy, which further spurred on the drive towards Italian unification.
- 1816
  - City becomes capital of Kingdom of the Two Sicilies.
  - L'Hortus Camaldulensis di Napoli established.
  - Real Museo Borbonico inaugurated.
- 1819 – Villa Floridiana built.
- 1820 – Revolution of July.
- 1821 – Flag of Naples red and yellow design adopted.
- 1825 - Palazzo San Giacomo construction completed.
- 1826
  - English Cemetery established.
  - Villa Pignatelli built.
- 1835 – Premiere of Donizetti's opera Lucia di Lammermoor.
- 1839 – Napoli-Portici railway begins operating.
- 1848 – The revolutionary movements produce a parliament and a new constitution, but the following year the parliament is dissolved.
- 1859 – Francesco II is the last King of the Two Sicilies.
- 1860 - Plebiscite taken on 21 October 1860 to bring Naples into the unified Kingdom of Italy under the House of Savoy.
- 1860 – Constitution.
- 1861 – Garibaldi arrives.
- 1862 - Anglican church in Vico San Pasquale built.
- 1867
  - Napoli Centrale railway station built.
  - Majello porcelain manufactory established.
- 1869 – Villa Comunale opens.
- 1870 – Many revolts against the unitary state, particularly in the countryside. This is the principle of the "southern question".
- 1871 – Population: 448,743.
- 1875 – Società Napoletana di Storia Patria (history society) founded.
- 1880 – Club Africano di Napoli founded (later Società africana d'Italia).
- 1882 – Filangieri Museum opens.
- 1883 – Galleria Principe di Napoli (shopping arcade) built.
- 1884 – Cholera epidemic. One year later is proclaimed the big "Restoration of Naples".

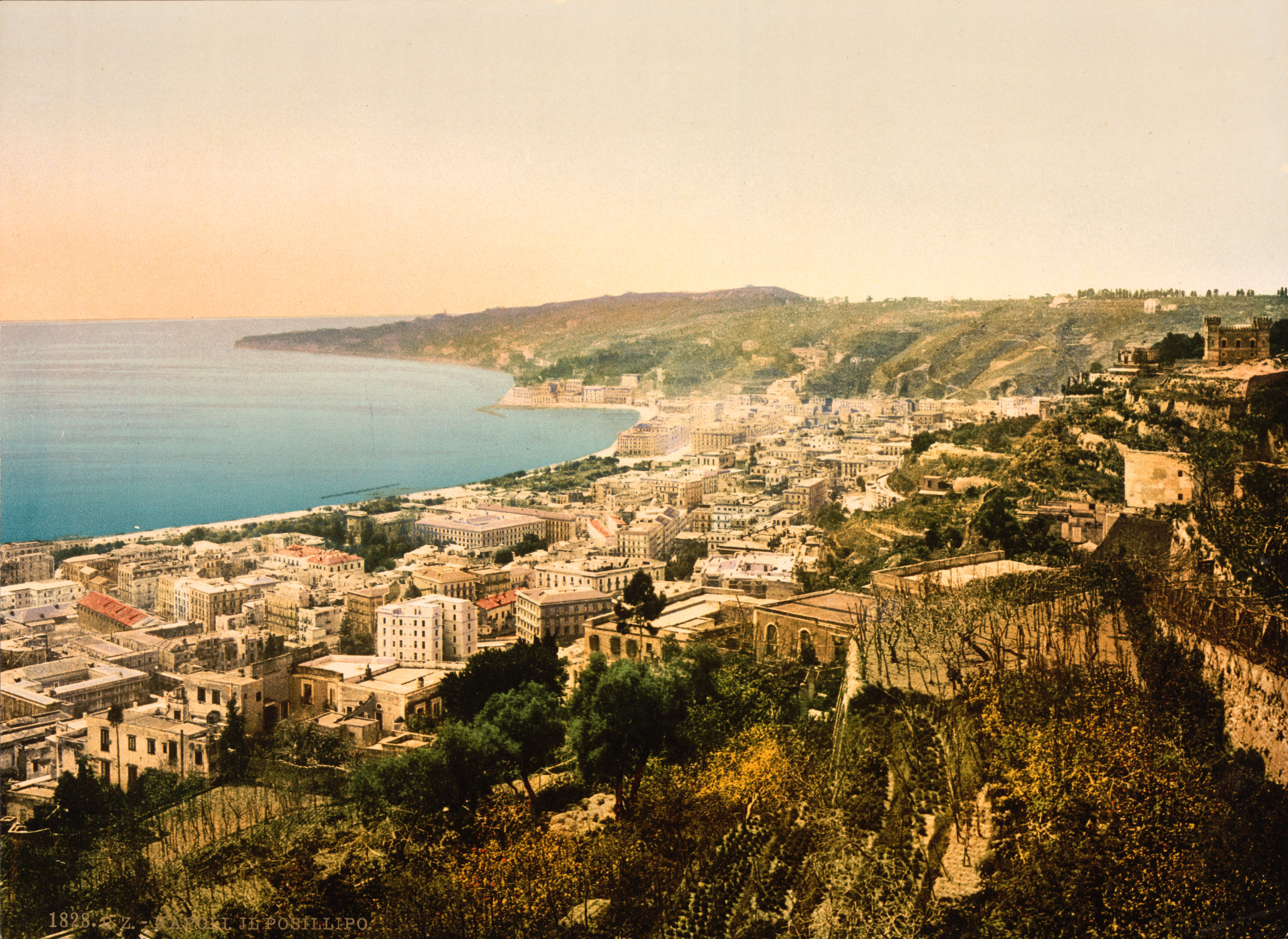
Naples in the 1890s

- 1890
  - Circumvesuviana founded.
  - Galleria Umberto I founded.
- 1891 – Galleria Umberto I built.
- 1892 – Il Mattino begins publication.
- 1897 – Population: 536,073.

== 20th century ==
- 1901 - Population: 547,503.
- 1906 – Mount Vesuvius erupts.
- 1907 - Rome–Formia–Naples railway construction begins.
- 1925 – Stadio Arturo Collana opens. In September, opening of the Metro Fs, the current Line 2 (first in Italy).
- 1926 – S.S.C. Napoli football club founded.
- 1929 – Naples hosts the 1929 World Fencing Championships.
- 1930
  - Parthenope University of Naples established.
  - Parco Virgiliano (Mergellina) established (approximate date).
- 1940 – Bombing begins. Inauguration of the Mostra d'Oltremare: an expositive and entertainment complex promoted by the Fascist regime.

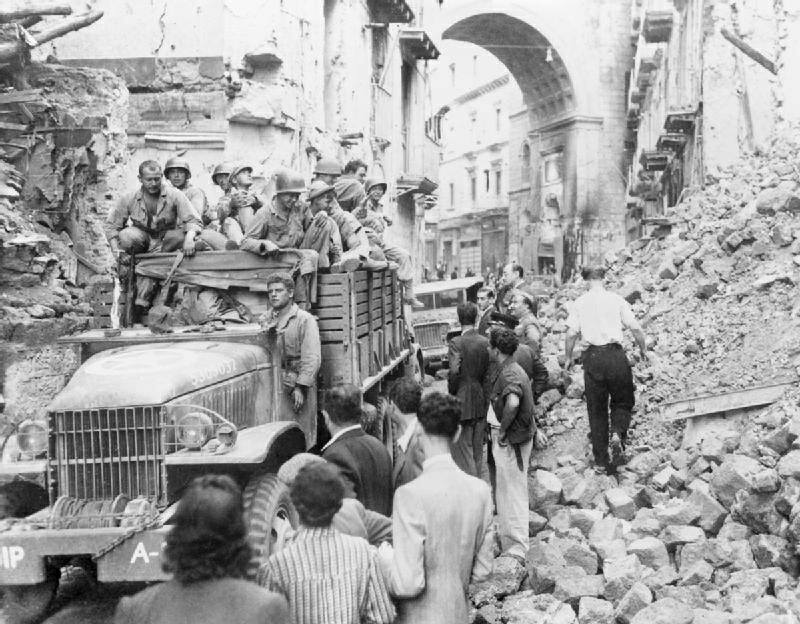
Four Days of Naples (1943)

- 1943
  - September – Four days of Naples.
  - October – Post-office bombing.
- 1944 – Naples is occupied by the Americans. In the same year, the last eruption of Vesuvius.
- 1945 – Eduardo De Filippo writes the play The Millions of Naples, his first success.
- 1950 – Naples Airport operating commercial flights.
- 1954 – Naples hosts The International Exhibition of Navigation.
- 1959 – Stadio San Paolo opens.
- 1960 – Napoli Centrale railway station rebuilt.
- 1963 – The film Hands over the City, is the strong complaint of the political and social climate of the time.
- 1965 – Naples hosts the Eurovision Song Contest 1965.
- 1969 – Naples co-hosts the EuroBasket 1969.
- 1971 – Population of the Comune (administrative limits): 1,250,000.
- 1975 – Vele di Scampia built.
- 1980 – 1980 Irpinia earthquake destroys many little towns near Naples.
- 1981 – Kidnapping of Ciro Cirillo.
- 1982 – Inauguration of the business district, the Centro Direzionale.
- 1987 – S.S.C. Napoli wins its first Italian football championship.
- 1988 – Bombing.
- 1989 – S.S.C. Napoli wins the 1988–89 UEFA Cup.
- 1990 – S.S.C. Napoli wins its second Italian football championship. City hosts FIFA World Cup.
- 1993 – Line 1 (Naples Metro) begins operating.
- 1994 – City hosts 20th G7 summit.
- 1995 – Telecom Italia Tower built.
- 1996 – Città della Scienza founded.
- 1997 – Corriere del Mezzogiorno begins publication.
- 2000 – Secret Museum re-opens.

== 21st century ==
- 2001 – Coral Jewellery Museum opens.
- 2002 – Università degli Studi di Napoli "L'Orientale" active.
- 2005 – Rome–Naples high-speed railway begins operating.
- 2006 – il Napoli newspaper begins publication.
- 2007
  - Line 6 (Naples Metro) begins operating.
  - The waste emergency, the uncontrolled crime disfigure the image of Naples in the world.
- 2009 – Rome–Naples high-speed railway opened.
- 2010 – Circumvesuviana derailment.
- 2011 – Luigi de Magistris becomes mayor.
- 2012
  - Milan-Naples Nuovo Trasporto Viaggiatori (train) begins operating.
  - World Urban Forum held.
- 2016 – June: Naples municipal election, 2016 held.
- 2017 – Neapolitan pizzaiolo added to the UNESCO Intangible Cultural Heritage List.
- 2019 – Naples hosts the 2019 Summer Universiade.

== See also ==
- History of Naples
- List of mayors of Naples

Other cities in the macroregion of Southern Italy:^{(it)}

- Timeline of Bari, Apulia region
- Timeline of Brindisi, Apulia
- Timeline of L'Aquila, Abruzzo region
- Timeline of Reggio Calabria
- Timeline of Salerno, Campania region
- Timeline of Taranto, Apulia

== Bibliography ==
=== Published in the 19th century ===
- "Naples". A Geographical, Historical and Political Description of the Empire of Germany, Holland, the Netherlands, Switzerland, Prussia, Italy, Sicily, Corsica and Sardinia: With a Gazetteer. London: John Stockdale. 1800. OCLC 79519893.
- Josiah Conder (1834), "Naples", Italy, The Modern Traveller, vol. 33, London: J.Duncan
- Mariana Starke (1839), "Naples", Travels in Europe (9th ed.), Paris: A. and W. Galignani
- Dorr, David F. (1858), "Naples", A Colored Man Round the World, Cleveland, Ohio: Printed for the Author, OCLC 2475546
- J. Willoughby Rosse (1859). "Naples". Index of Dates ... Facts in the Chronology and History of the World. Bohn's reference library. London: H.G. Bohn. hdl:2027/hvd.32044098621048 – via HathiTrust.
- William Smith, ed. (1872) [1854]. "Neapolis". Dictionary of Greek and Roman Geography. London: John Murray. hdl:2027/hvd.ah5cur.
- John Ramsay McCulloch (1877), "Naples", A Dictionary, Practical, Theoretical, and Historical, of Commerce and Commercial Navigation, Hugh G. Reid, ed., London: Longmans, Green, and Co., hdl:2027/njp.32101079877088
- Noah Brooks (1895), "Naples", The Mediterranean Trip, C. Scribner's Sons, OCLC 1315401

=== Published in the 20th century ===
- "Naples and its Nearer Environs", Italy from the Alps to Naples (2nd ed.), Leipzig: Karl Baedeker, 1909, OCLC 400551 + 1867 ed.
- Neville-Rolfe, Eustace (1910). "Naples" . Encyclopædia Britannica. Vol. 19 (11th ed.). pp. 178–182.
- Augustus J. C. Hare (1911), "Naples", Cities of Southern Italy, New York: Dutton
- Trudy Ring, ed. (1996). "Naples". Southern Europe. International Dictionary of Historic Places. Vol. 3. Fitzroy Dearborn. OCLC 31045650.
- "Southern Italy: Naples". Italy. Let's Go. St Martins Press. 1998. p. 400+. ISBN 978-0-312-16895-7. OL 16445167W.
- Paul Arthur, ed. (2002). "London". Naples, from Roman town to city-state. British School at Rome. Vol. 12. BSR. OCLC 495546269.

=== Published in the 21st century ===
- "Naples". Understanding Slums: Case Studies for the Global Report 2003. United Nations Human Settlements Programme and University College London. 2003. Archived from the original on 12 July 2018.
