= NUTS statistical regions of Italy =

In the NUTS (Nomenclature of Territorial Units for Statistics) codes of Italy (IT), the three levels are:

| Level | Subdivisions | # |
|---|---|---|
| NUTS 1 | Groups of regions (Gruppi di regioni) | 5 |
| NUTS 2 | Regions (Regioni) (Trentino-Alto Adige/Südtirol split into two) | 21 |
| NUTS 3 | Provinces (Province) | 107 |

== NUTS codes ==
| NUTS 1 | Code | NUTS 2 | Code | NUTS 3 | Code |
|---|---|---|---|---|---|
| Northwest Italy | ITC | Piemonte | ITC1 | Torino | ITC11 |
| Northwest Italy | ITC | Piemonte | ITC1 | Vercelli | ITC12 |
| Northwest Italy | ITC | Piemonte | ITC1 | Biella | ITC13 |
| Northwest Italy | ITC | Piemonte | ITC1 | Verbano-Cusio-Ossola | ITC14 |
| Northwest Italy | ITC | Piemonte | ITC1 | Novara | ITC15 |
| Northwest Italy | ITC | Piemonte | ITC1 | Cuneo | ITC16 |
| Northwest Italy | ITC | Piemonte | ITC1 | Asti | ITC17 |
| Northwest Italy | ITC | Piemonte | ITC1 | Alessandria | ITC18 |
| Northwest Italy | ITC | Valle d'Aosta | ITC2 | Aosta | ITC20 |
| Northwest Italy | ITC | Liguria | ITC3 | Imperia | ITC31 |
| Northwest Italy | ITC | Liguria | ITC3 | Savona | ITC32 |
| Northwest Italy | ITC | Liguria | ITC3 | Genova | ITC33 |
| Northwest Italy | ITC | Liguria | ITC3 | La Spezia | ITC34 |
| Northwest Italy | ITC | Lombardia | ITC4 | Varese | ITC41 |
| Northwest Italy | ITC | Lombardia | ITC4 | Como | ITC42 |
| Northwest Italy | ITC | Lombardia | ITC4 | Lecco | ITC43 |
| Northwest Italy | ITC | Lombardia | ITC4 | Sondrio | ITC44 |
| Northwest Italy | ITC | Lombardia | ITC4 | Bergamo | ITC46 |
| Northwest Italy | ITC | Lombardia | ITC4 | Brescia | ITC47 |
| Northwest Italy | ITC | Lombardia | ITC4 | Pavia | ITC48 |
| Northwest Italy | ITC | Lombardia | ITC4 | Lodi | ITC49 |
| Northwest Italy | ITC | Lombardia | ITC4 | Cremona | ITC4A |
| Northwest Italy | ITC | Lombardia | ITC4 | Mantova | ITC4B |
| Northwest Italy | ITC | Lombardia | ITC4 | Milano | ITC4C |
| Northwest Italy | ITC | Lombardia | ITC4 | Monza and Brianza | ITC4D |
| South Italy | ITF | Abruzzo | ITF1 | L'Aquila | ITF11 |
| South Italy | ITF | Abruzzo | ITF1 | Teramo | ITF12 |
| South Italy | ITF | Abruzzo | ITF1 | Pescara | ITF13 |
| South Italy | ITF | Abruzzo | ITF1 | Chieti | ITF14 |
| South Italy | ITF | Molise | ITF2 | Isernia | ITF21 |
| South Italy | ITF | Molise | ITF2 | Campobasso | ITF22 |
| South Italy | ITF | Campania | ITF3 | Caserta | ITF31 |
| South Italy | ITF | Campania | ITF3 | Benevento | ITF32 |
| South Italy | ITF | Campania | ITF3 | Napoli | ITF33 |
| South Italy | ITF | Campania | ITF3 | Avellino | ITF34 |
| South Italy | ITF | Campania | ITF3 | Salerno | ITF35 |
| South Italy | ITF | Puglia | ITF4 | Taranto | ITF43 |
| South Italy | ITF | Puglia | ITF4 | Brindisi | ITF44 |
| South Italy | ITF | Puglia | ITF4 | Lecce | ITF45 |
| South Italy | ITF | Puglia | ITF4 | Foggia | ITF46 |
| South Italy | ITF | Puglia | ITF4 | Bari | ITF47 |
| South Italy | ITF | Puglia | ITF4 | Barletta-Andria-Trani | ITF48 |
| South Italy | ITF | Basilicata | ITF5 | Potenza | ITF51 |
| South Italy | ITF | Basilicata | ITF5 | Matera | ITF52 |
| South Italy | ITF | Calabria | ITF6 | Cosenza | ITF61 |
| South Italy | ITF | Calabria | ITF6 | Crotone | ITF62 |
| South Italy | ITF | Calabria | ITF6 | Catanzaro | ITF63 |
| South Italy | ITF | Calabria | ITF6 | Vibo Valentia | ITF64 |
| South Italy | ITF | Calabria | ITF6 | Reggio Calabria | ITF65 |
| Insular Italy | ITG | Sicilia | ITG1 | Trapani | ITG11 |
| Insular Italy | ITG | Sicilia | ITG1 | Palermo | ITG12 |
| Insular Italy | ITG | Sicilia | ITG1 | Messina | ITG13 |
| Insular Italy | ITG | Sicilia | ITG1 | Agrigento | ITG14 |
| Insular Italy | ITG | Sicilia | ITG1 | Caltanissetta | ITG15 |
| Insular Italy | ITG | Sicilia | ITG1 | Enna | ITG16 |
| Insular Italy | ITG | Sicilia | ITG1 | Catania | ITG17 |
| Insular Italy | ITG | Sicilia | ITG1 | Ragusa | ITG18 |
| Insular Italy | ITG | Sicilia | ITG1 | Siracusa | ITG19 |
| Insular Italy | ITG | Sardegna | ITG2 | Sassari | ITG25 |
| Insular Italy | ITG | Sardegna | ITG2 | Nuoro | ITG26 |
| Insular Italy | ITG | Sardegna | ITG2 | Cagliari | ITG27 |
| Insular Italy | ITG | Sardegna | ITG2 | Oristano | ITG28 |
| Insular Italy | ITG | Sardegna | ITG2 | Olbia-Tempio | ITG29 |
| Insular Italy | ITG | Sardegna | ITG2 | Ogliastra | ITG2A |
| Insular Italy | ITG | Sardegna | ITG2 | Medio Campidano | ITG2B |
| Insular Italy | ITG | Sardegna | ITG2 | Carbonia-Iglesias | ITG2C |
| Northeast Italy | ITH | Trentino-Alto Adige/Südtirol | ITH1 | South Tyrol | ITH10 |
| Northeast Italy | ITH | Trentino-Alto Adige/Südtirol | ITH2 | Trento | ITH20 |
| Northeast Italy | ITH | Veneto | ITH3 | Verona | ITH31 |
| Northeast Italy | ITH | Veneto | ITH3 | Vicenza | ITH32 |
| Northeast Italy | ITH | Veneto | ITH3 | Belluno | ITH33 |
| Northeast Italy | ITH | Veneto | ITH3 | Treviso | ITH34 |
| Northeast Italy | ITH | Veneto | ITH3 | Venezia | ITH35 |
| Northeast Italy | ITH | Veneto | ITH3 | Padova | ITH36 |
| Northeast Italy | ITH | Veneto | ITH3 | Rovigo | ITH37 |
| Northeast Italy | ITH | Friuli-Venezia Giulia | ITH4 | Pordenone | ITH41 |
| Northeast Italy | ITH | Friuli-Venezia Giulia | ITH4 | Udine | ITH42 |
| Northeast Italy | ITH | Friuli-Venezia Giulia | ITH4 | Gorizia | ITH43 |
| Northeast Italy | ITH | Friuli-Venezia Giulia | ITH4 | Trieste | ITH44 |
| Northeast Italy | ITH | Emilia-Romagna | ITH5 | Piacenza | ITH51 |
| Northeast Italy | ITH | Emilia-Romagna | ITH5 | Parma | ITH52 |
| Northeast Italy | ITH | Emilia-Romagna | ITH5 | Reggio Emilia | ITH53 |
| Northeast Italy | ITH | Emilia-Romagna | ITH5 | Modena | ITH54 |
| Northeast Italy | ITH | Emilia-Romagna | ITH5 | Bologna | ITH55 |
| Northeast Italy | ITH | Emilia-Romagna | ITH5 | Ferrara | ITH56 |
| Northeast Italy | ITH | Emilia-Romagna | ITH5 | Ravenna | ITH57 |
| Northeast Italy | ITH | Emilia-Romagna | ITH5 | Forlì-Cesena | ITH58 |
| Northeast Italy | ITH | Emilia-Romagna | ITH5 | Rimini | ITH59 |
| Central Italy | ITI | Toscana | ITI1 | Massa-Carrara | ITI11 |
| Central Italy | ITI | Toscana | ITI1 | Lucca | ITI12 |
| Central Italy | ITI | Toscana | ITI1 | Pistoia | ITI13 |
| Central Italy | ITI | Toscana | ITI1 | Firenze | ITI14 |
| Central Italy | ITI | Toscana | ITI1 | Prato | ITI15 |
| Central Italy | ITI | Toscana | ITI1 | Livorno | ITI16 |
| Central Italy | ITI | Toscana | ITI1 | Pisa | ITI17 |
| Central Italy | ITI | Toscana | ITI1 | Arezzo | ITI18 |
| Central Italy | ITI | Toscana | ITI1 | Siena | ITI19 |
| Central Italy | ITI | Toscana | ITI1 | Grosseto | ITI1A |
| Central Italy | ITI | Umbria | ITI2 | Perugia | ITI21 |
| Central Italy | ITI | Umbria | ITI2 | Terni | ITI22 |
| Central Italy | ITI | Marche | ITI3 | Pesaro-Urbino | ITI31 |
| Central Italy | ITI | Marche | ITI3 | Ancona | ITI32 |
| Central Italy | ITI | Marche | ITI3 | Macerata | ITI33 |
| Central Italy | ITI | Marche | ITI3 | Ascoli Piceno | ITI34 |
| Central Italy | ITI | Marche | ITI3 | Fermo | ITI35 |
| Central Italy | ITI | Lazio | ITI4 | Viterbo | ITI41 |
| Central Italy | ITI | Lazio | ITI4 | Rieti | ITI42 |
| Central Italy | ITI | Lazio | ITI4 | Roma | ITI43 |
| Central Italy | ITI | Lazio | ITI4 | Latina | ITI44 |
| Central Italy | ITI | Lazio | ITI4 | Frosinone | ITI45 |

The following codes have been discontinued:

- ITC45 (Milano) was split into ITC4C and ITC4D.
- ITD (Northeast Italy) became ITH.
- ITE (Central Italy) became ITI.
- ITF41 (Foggia) and ITF42 (Bari) were split into ITF46, ITF47, and ITF48.
- ITG21 (Sassari), ITG22 (Nuoro), ITG23 (Oristano), and ITG24 (Cagliari) were split into the current divisions of ITG2.

== Local administrative units ==
Below the NUTS levels, the two LAU (Local Administrative Units) levels are:

| Level | Subdivisions | # |
|---|---|---|
| LAU 1 | — (same as NUTS 3) | 107 |
| LAU 2 | Municipalities (Comuni) | 8094 |

The LAU codes of Italy can be downloaded here:

== See also ==
- Subdivisions of Italy
- ISO 3166-2 codes of Italy
- FIPS region codes of Italy

== Sources ==
- Hierarchical list of the Nomenclature of territorial units for statistics - NUTS and the Statistical regions of Europe
- Overview map of EU Countries - NUTS level 1
  - ITALIA - NUTS level 2
  - ITALIA - NUTS level 3
- Correspondence between the NUTS levels and the national administrative units
- List of current NUTS codes
  - Download current NUTS codes (ODS format)
- Provinces of Italy, Statoids.com
