= Central Italy =

Macroregion and statistical region of Italy

Coordinates: 42.3097°N 13.2494°E

Central Italy Italia centrale (Italian) Centro Italia (Italian)
- Statistical region
- Country: Italy
- Largest city: Rome
- Regions: List: Lazio; Marche; Tuscany; Umbria

Area
  - Total: 58,028.15 km^{2} (22,404.79 sq mi)

Population (2026)
  - Total: 11,699,125
  - Density: 201.6112/km^{2} (522.1706/sq mi)
- Languages
  - Official language: Italian
  - Other common languages: Central Italian; Tuscan

Central Italy (Italian: Italia centrale or Centro Italia) is one of the five official statistical regions of Italy used by the Italian National Institute of Statistics (ISTAT), a first-level NUTS region with code ITI, and a European Parliament constituency. It has 11,699,125 inhabitants as of 2026.

== Geography ==
Central Italy is crossed by the northern and central Apennines and is washed by the Adriatic Sea to the east, by the Tyrrhenian Sea and the Ligurian Sea to the west. The main rivers of this portion of the territory are the Arno and the Tiber with their tributaries (e.g. Aniene), and the Liri-Garigliano. The most important lakes are Lake Trasimeno, Lake Montedoglio, Lake Bolsena, Lake Bracciano, Lake Vico, Lake Albano, and Lake Nemi. From an altimetric point of view, central Italy has a predominantly hilly territory (68.9%). The mountainous and flat areas are equivalent to 26.9% and 4.2% of the territorial distribution, respectively.

=== Regions ===
Central Italy encompasses four of Italy's twenty regions, including Tuscany, Marche, Umbria, and Lazio (listed in geographical order from north to south). In the northernmost parts of this territory, specifically in the northwesternmost areas of Tuscany and the northern parts of Marche, Gallo-Italic dialects typical of Northern Italy are spoken, reflecting the intense historical exchanges between these areas and northern Italy. Conversely, the easternmost and southernmost parts of Lazio (Cittaducale, Amatrice, Sora, Cassino, Isola del Liri, Sperlonga, Fondi, Gaeta, and Formia districts, as well as the islands of Ponza and Ventotene) are sometimes connected to southern Italy (the Mezzogiorno) for cultural and historical reasons; they were once part of the Kingdom of the Two Sicilies and southern Italian dialects are spoken there, reflecting their status as part of Southern Italy until they were permanently annexed to Lazio during the administrative borders reorganization of 1927. From a strictly geographical standpoint, central Italy may also include the regions of Abruzzo and Molise, which are otherwise considered part of Southern Italy for sociocultural, linguistic, and historical reasons. Indeed, in the official macro-regional division defined by the Italian National Institute of Statistics (ISTAT) and corresponding to the European Union's NUTS 1 classification, both Abruzzo and Molise are officially categorized under South Italy.

Region	Capital	Population (2026)	Area (km²)	Density (inh./km²)
Lazio	Rome	5,709,444	17,232.29	331.3
Marche	Ancona	1,479,832	9,344.49	158.4
Toscana	Florence	3,659,222	22,987.04	159.2
Umbria	Perugia	850,627	8,464.33	100.5

== History ==
Map of the Italian Peninsula in 1796 showing the Papal States and the Grand Duchy of Tuscany

For centuries before the unification of Italy, which occurred in 1861, central Italy was divided into two states: the Papal States and the Grand Duchy of Tuscany.

=== Papal States ===
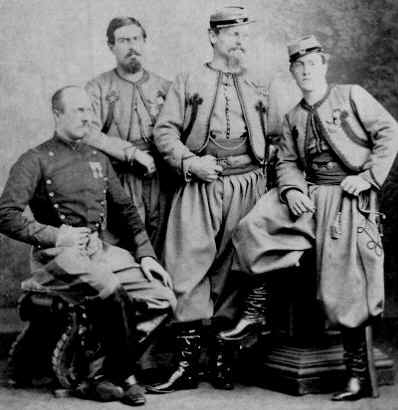
Papal Zouaves pose in 1869.

The Papal States, officially the State of the Church, were a series of territories in the Italian Peninsula under the direct sovereign rule of the pope from 756 until 1870. They were among the major states of Italy from the 8th century until the unification of Italy, between 1859 and 1870. The state had its origins in the rise of Christianity throughout Italy and, with it, the rising influence of the Christian Church. By the mid-8th century, with the decline of the Byzantine Empire in Italy, the papacy became effectively sovereign. Several Christian rulers, including Frankish kings Charlemagne and Pepin the Short, donated further lands to be governed by the Church.

During the Renaissance, the papal territory expanded greatly, and the Pope became one of Italy's most important secular rulers as well as the head of the Church. At their zenith, the Papal States covered most of the modern Italian regions of Lazio, which includes Rome; Marche; Umbria; Romagna; and portions of Emilia. Those holdings were considered to be a manifestation of the temporal power of the pope, as opposed to his ecclesiastical primacy. By 1861, much of the Papal States' territory had been conquered by the Kingdom of Italy. Only Lazio, including Rome, remained under the pope's temporal control. In 1870, the pope lost Lazio and Rome and had no physical territory at all except the Leonine City of Rome, which the new Italian state did not occupy militarily despite its annexation of Lazio. In 1929, the Italian fascist leader Benito Mussolini, the head of the Italian government, ended the "Prisoner in the Vatican" problem involving a unified Italy and the Holy See by negotiating the Lateran Treaty, signed by the two parties. The treaty recognized the sovereignty of the Holy See over a newly created international territorial entity, a city-state within Rome limited to a token territory that became the Vatican City.

=== Grand Duchy of Tuscany ===
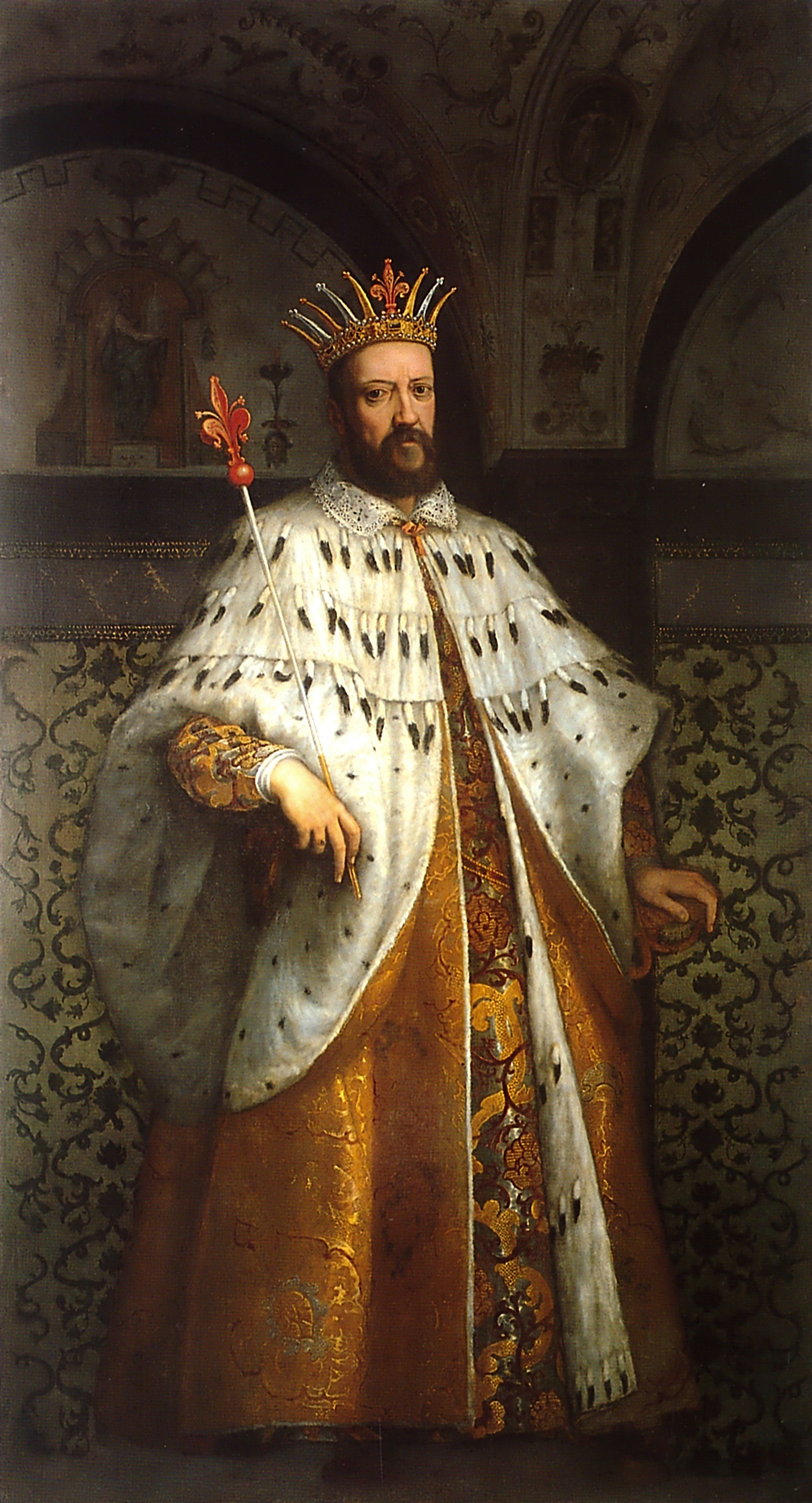
Cosimo I de' Medici, Grand Duke of Tuscany

The Grand Duchy of Tuscany was an Italian monarchy that existed, with interruptions, from 1569 to 1860 and replaced the Republic of Florence. The grand duchy's capital was Florence. In the 19th century, the population of the grand duchy was about 1,815,000 inhabitants. Having brought nearly all Tuscany under his control after he had conquered the Republic of Siena, Cosimo I de' Medici was elevated by a papal bull of Pope Pius V to Grand Duke of Tuscany on 27 August 1569. The Grand Duchy was ruled by the House of Medici until the extinction of its senior branch in 1737. While not as internationally renowned as the old republic, the Grand Duchy thrived under the Medici and bore witness to unprecedented economic and military success under Cosimo I and his sons until the reign of Ferdinando II, which saw the beginning of the state's long economic decline, peaking under Cosimo III.

Francis Stephen of Lorraine, a cognatic descendant of the Medici, succeeded the family and ascended the throne of his Medicean ancestors. Tuscany was governed by a viceroy, Marc de Beauvau-Craon, for his entire rule. His descendants ruled and resided in the Grand Duchy until its end in 1859, barring one interruption, when Napoleon Bonaparte gave Tuscany to the House of Bourbon-Parma (Kingdom of Etruria, 1801–1807) and later annexed it directly to the First French Empire. After the collapse of the Napoleon in 1814, the Grand Duchy was restored. The United Provinces of Central Italy, a client state of the Kingdom of Sardinia, annexed Tuscany in 1859. Tuscany was formally annexed to Sardinia in 1860 as part of the unification of Italy after a landslide referendum in which 95% of voters approved.

== Demographics ==
Historical population
Year	Pop.	±%
1871	4,733,272	—
1881	4,913,385	+3.8%
1901	5,756,662	+17.2%
1911	6,199,206	+7.7%
1921	6,665,167	+7.5%
1931	7,198,160	+8.0%
1936	7,633,552	+6.0%
1951	8,633,879	+13.1%
1961	9,361,244	+8.4%
1971	10,278,806	+9.8%
1981	10,783,100	+4.9%
1991	10,892,024	+1.0%
2001	10,886,776	−0.0%
2011	11,598,055	+6.5%
2021	11,724,035	+1.1%
Source: ISTAT

As of 2026, the population is 11,699,125, of which 48.7% are male, and 51.3% are female. Minors make up 14.1% of the population, and seniors make up 25.7%.

=== Largest cities ===
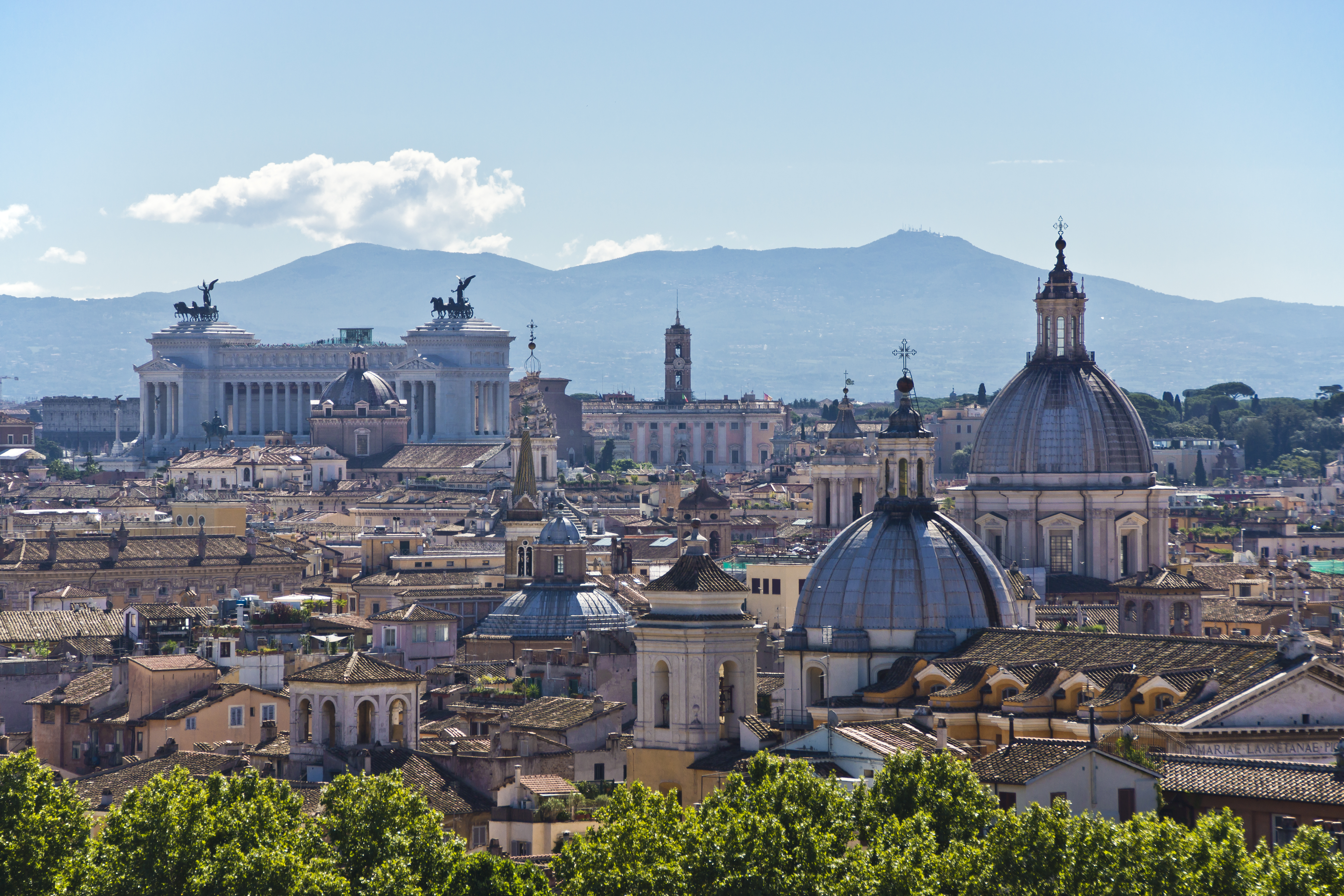
Rome

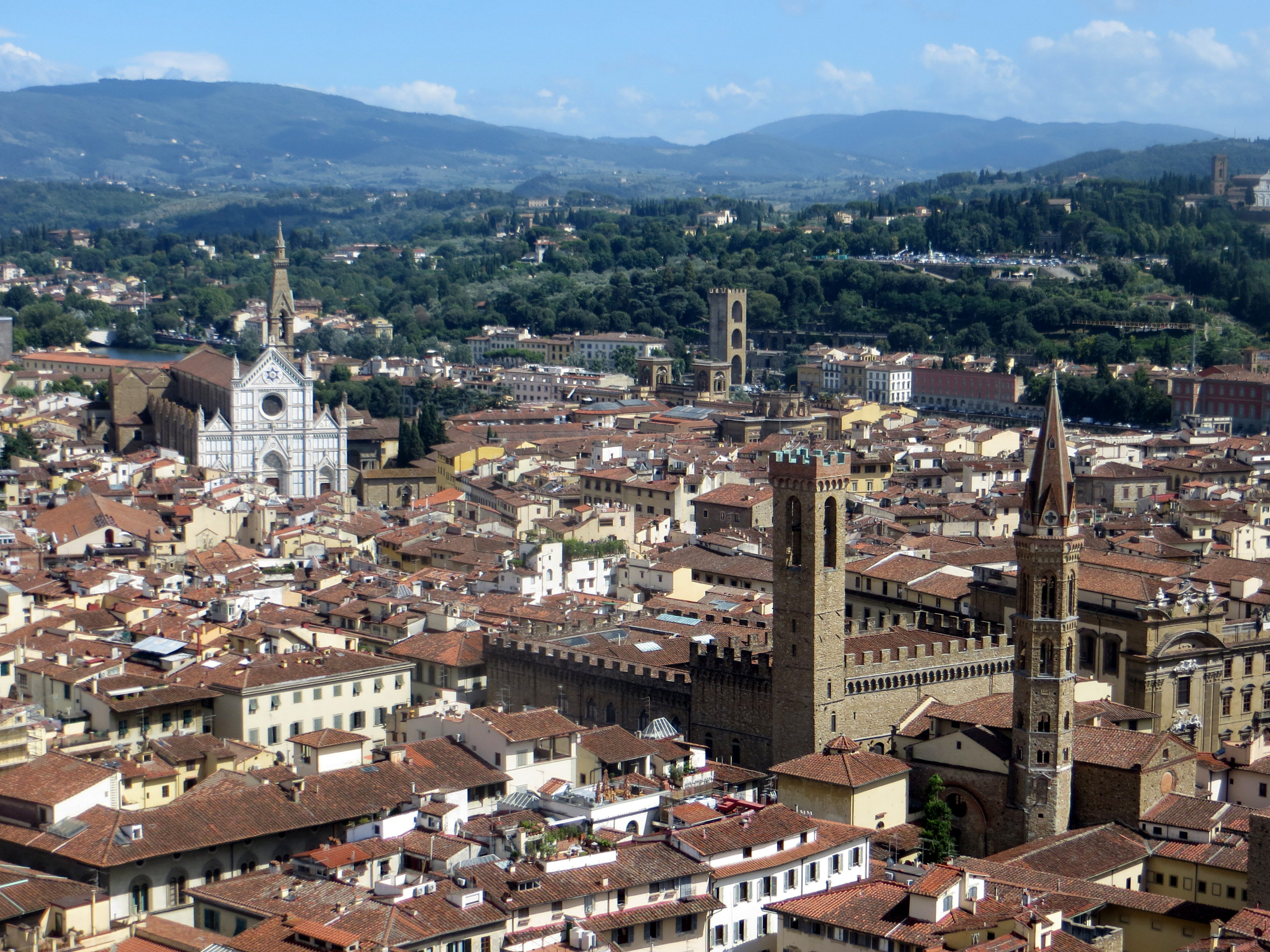
Florence

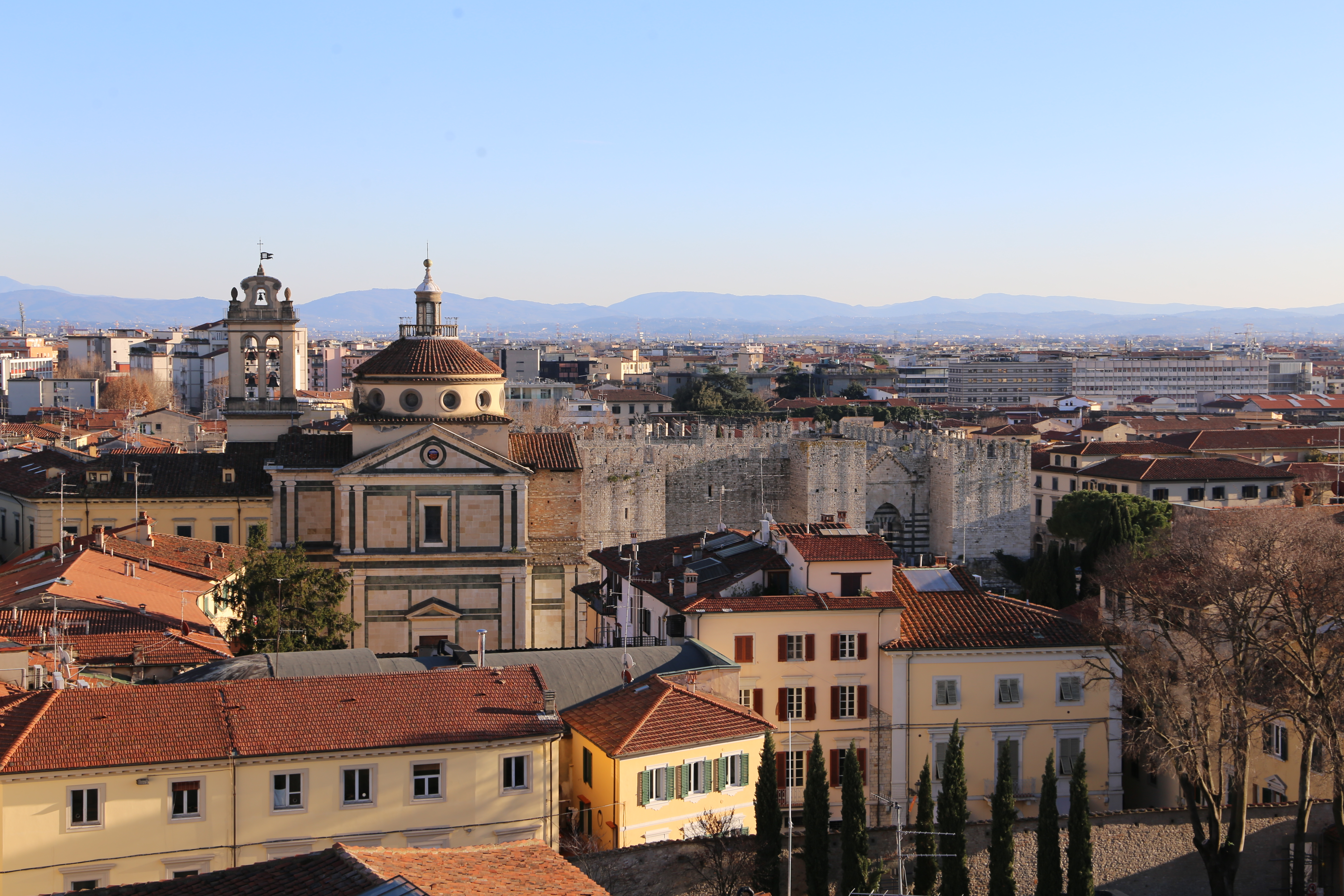
Prato

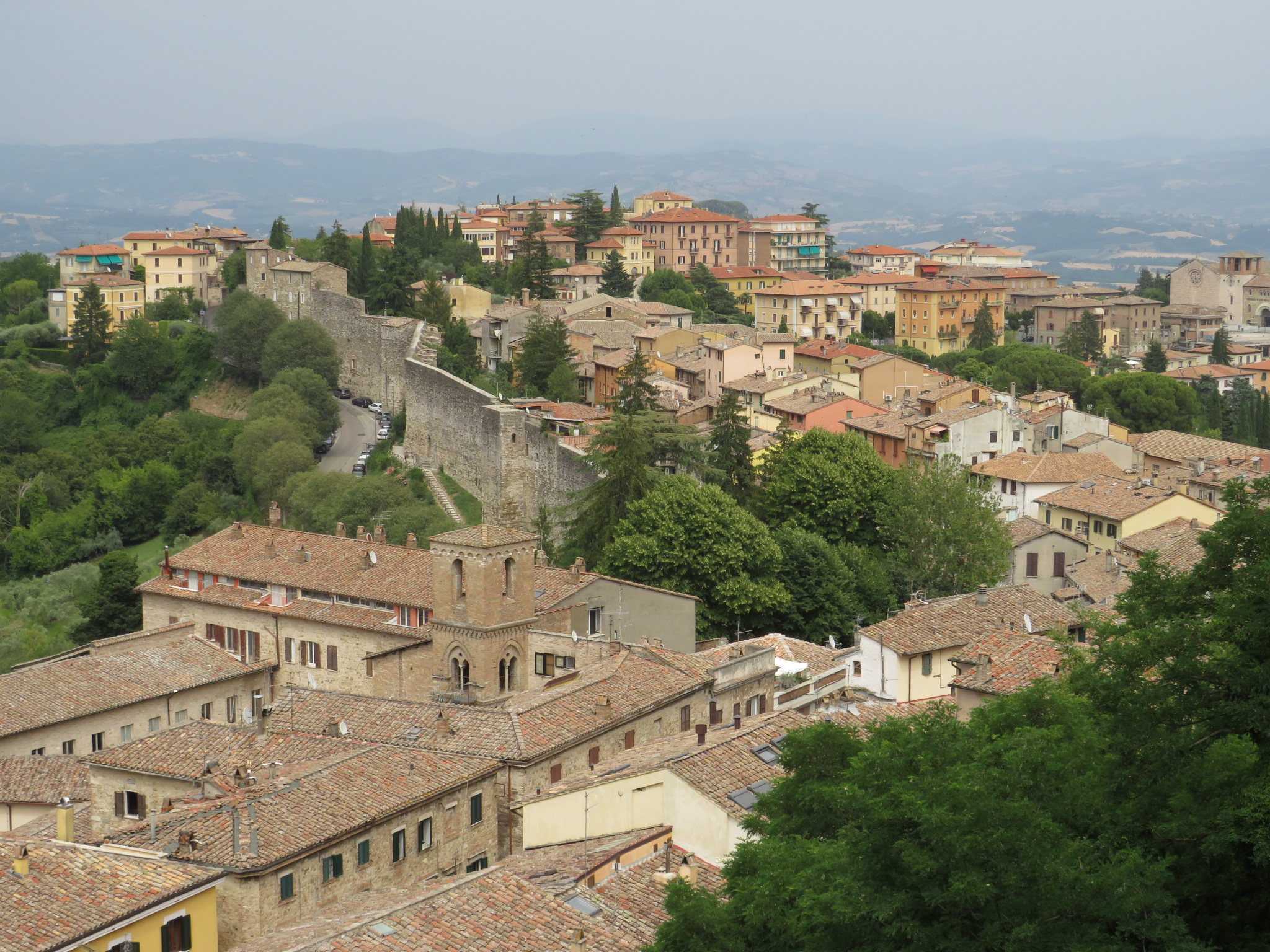
Perugia

The most populous cities with more than 50,000 inhabitants are:

City	Region	Population (2026)
Rome	Lazio	2,745,062
Florence	Toscana	361,625
Prato	Toscana	198,327
Perugia	Umbria	162,384
Livorno	Toscana	152,451
Latina	Lazio	127,450
Terni	Umbria	106,272
Ancona	Marche	100,151
Arezzo	Toscana	96,506
Pesaro	Marche	95,270
Pisa	Toscana	90,146
Guidonia Montecelio	Lazio	89,420
Pistoia	Toscana	89,094
Lucca	Toscana	88,464
Fiumicino	Lazio	83,415
Grosseto	Toscana	81,275
Aprilia	Lazio	74,697
Viterbo	Lazio	66,767
Massa	Toscana	65,547
Pomezia	Lazio	64,970
Viareggio	Toscana	60,680
Anzio	Lazio	60,063
Fano	Marche	59,871
Carrara	Toscana	59,723
Tivoli	Lazio	55,321
Foligno	Umbria	55,262
Siena	Toscana	53,180
Velletri	Lazio	53,048
Ardea	Lazio	51,374
Civitavecchia	Lazio	51,359

=== Languages ===
Languages and regional varieties in Italy

Central Italy is dominated by the Tuscan dialect and Central Italian. Other languages spoken include Gallo-Tailic varieties, specifically the Lunigiano dialect (which features strong Emilian and Ligurian influences) in the northwesternmost fringes of Tuscany, primarily within the Province of Massa and Carrara, and Gallo-Piceno ("Gallo-Italic Marche" or "Gaul-Marche"), a Gallo-Italic language spoken in the Province of Pesaro and Urbino and in the northern part of the province of Ancona, Marche region. Conversely, Neapolitan (Southern Italian) varieties are spoken in southernmost Lazio.

Tuscan dialect is a set of Italo-Dalmatian varieties of Romance spoken in Tuscany. Standard Italian is based on Tuscan, specifically on its Florentine dialect, and it became the language of culture throughout Italy because of the prestige of the works by Dante Alighieri, Petrarch, Giovanni Boccaccio, Niccolò Machiavelli, and Francesco Guicciardini. It would later become the official language of all Italian states and of the Kingdom of Italy when it was formed. Outside of Tuscany, Corsican on the island of Corsica, along with the Corso-Sardinian transitional varieties spoken in northern Sardinia (Gallurese and Sassarese), are historically linked to medieval Tuscan due to historical Pisan and Genoese influences; however, having heavily interacted with Sardinian, Ligurian, and Iberian languages, they now constitute highly distinct linguistic groups that are structurally independent from modern Tuscan.

Central Italian itself refers to the dialects of Italo-Romance spoken in the *Area Mediana*, which covers a swathe of central Italy including Umbria, central Marche, and central Lazio. This *Area Mediana* is also used in a narrower sense to describe the southern part, in which case the northern one may be referred to as the *Area Perimediana*, a distinction that will be made throughout this article. The two areas are divided along a line running approximately from Rome in the southwest to Ancona in the northeast.

In the Early Middle Ages, Central Italian extended north into Romagna and covered all of modern-day Lazio, Abruzzo, and Molise. Since then, the dialects spoken in those areas have been assimilated into Gallo-Italic and Southern Italo-Romance respectively. In addition, the dialect of Rome has undergone considerable Tuscanization from the fifteenth century onwards, such that it has lost many of its traditional central Italian features.

=== Immigration ===
As of 2025, immigrants make up 13.6% of the population. The 5 largest foreign countries of birth are Romania, Albania, China, Morocco, and Bangladesh.

== Politics ==
Together with the bordering Emilia-Romagna of northeastern Italy, the central Italian regions of Marche, Tuscany, and Umbria are historically considered to be the most left-leaning regions in Italy and together are known as the "Red Zone" (la zona rossa); they are also referred to as the "Red Belt", and have been compared to similar "Red Zones" in France and Finland, where Western European communism achieved its greatest success.

Known in Italian as regioni rosse (red regions), the "Red Belt" has been compared to the "Red Wall" in British politics. As with the "Red Wall" in Britain, the "Red Belt" regions were put under comparable pressure by right-wing populists in the late 2010s and early 2020s, particularly by the League of Matteo Salvini; even before the rise of Salvini, when it was still known as the Northern League, it had improved results by the early 2010s. In 2019, the centre-left coalition lost Umbria to the centre-right coalition but won it back in 2024; in 2020, the centre-left coalition also lost Marche, and failed to win it back in 2025. Alongside Emilia-Romagna, Tuscany proved to be the most reliable region of the "Red Belt", maintaining in 2025 its 150-year old left-leaning trend.

== Culture ==
The Colosseum in Rome, one of the most popular tourist attractions in the world

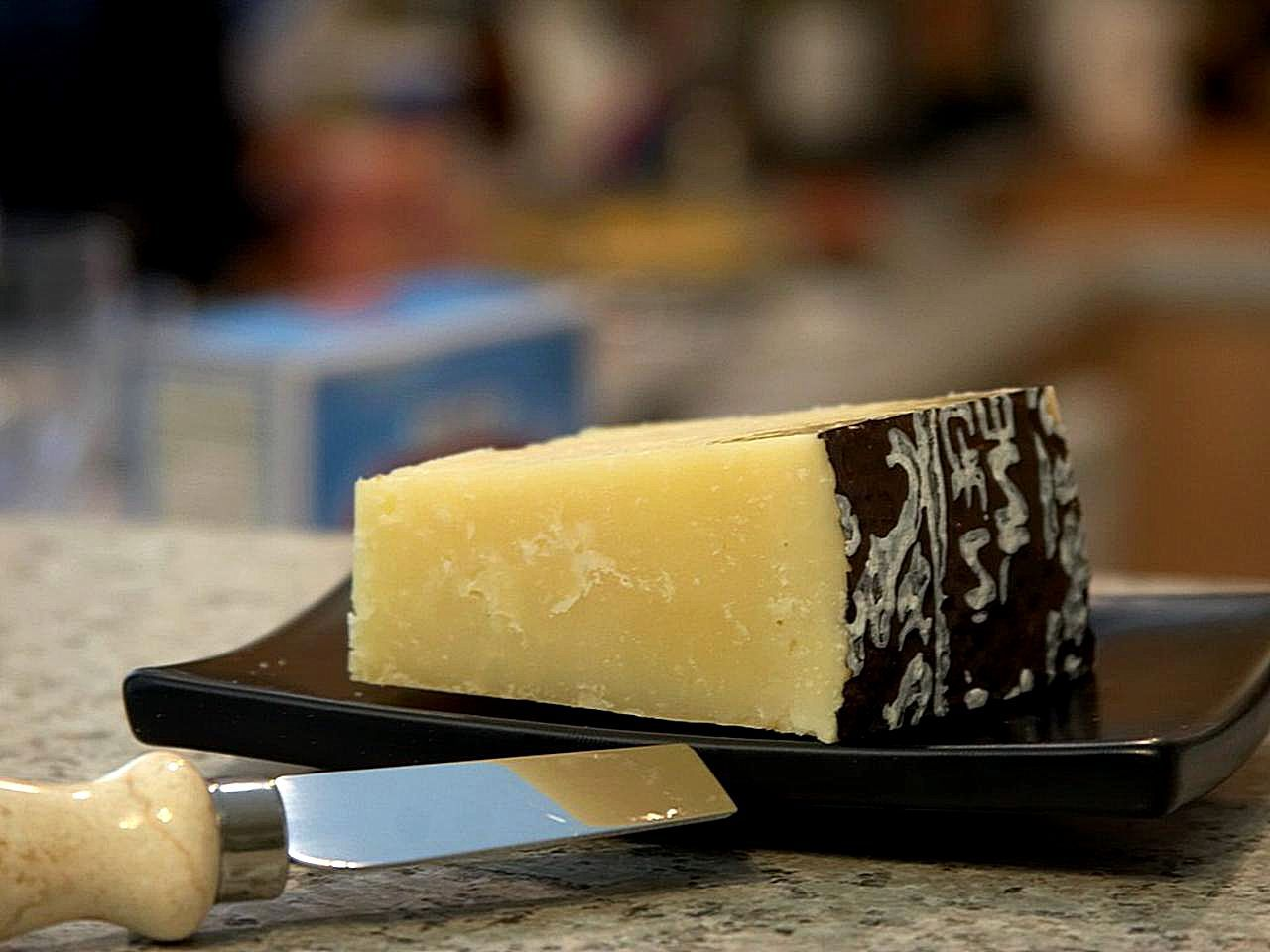
Pecorino romano cheese

The regions of central Italy were exposed to different historical influences because of the peoples that settled there, such as the Celts, the Etruscans, the North Picenes, the South Picene, the Umbri, the Latins, the Romans, the Byzantines, and the Lombards. Some of its woodlands and mountains are preserved in several National Parks; a major example is the Abruzzo, Lazio and Molise National Park, located in Abruzzo, with smaller parts in Lazio and Molise. It is the oldest in the Apennine Mountains and the second-oldest in Italy, with an important role in the preservation of endemic species such as the Italian wolf, Abruzzo chamois and Marsican brown bear.

Central Italy has many major tourist attractions, many of which are protected by UNESCO. Central Italy is possibly the most visited part of Italy and contains many popular attractions as well as sought-after landscapes. Rome boasts the remaining wonders of the Roman Empire and some of the world's best-known landmarks, such as the Colosseum. Florence, regarded as the birthplace of the Italian Renaissance, is Tuscany's most visited city, and nearby cities like Siena, Pisa, Arezzo, and Lucca also have rich cultural heritage. Umbria's population is small but has many important cities such as Perugia and Assisi. For similar reasons, Lazio and Tuscany are some of Italy's most visited regions and the main targets for Ecotourism. The area is known for its picturesque landscapes and attracts tourists from all over the world, including Italy itself. Pristine landscapes serve as one of the primary motivators for tourists to visit central Italy, although there are others, such as a rich history of art.

Roman cuisine comes from the Italian city of Rome. It features fresh, seasonal, and simply prepared ingredients from the Roman Campagna. Then include peas, globe artichokes and fava beans, shellfish, milk-fed lamb and goat, and cheeses such as pecorino romano and ricotta. Olive oil is used mostly to dress raw vegetables, and strutto (pork lard) and fat from prosciutto are preferred for frying. The most popular sweets in Rome are small individual pastries called pasticcini, gelato and handmade chocolates and candies. Special dishes are often reserved for different days of the week; for example, gnocchi is eaten on Thursdays, baccalà (salted cod) on Fridays, and trippa on Saturdays.

== Economy ==
The gross domestic product (GDP) of the region was €380.9 billion in 2018, accounting for 21.6% of Italy's economic output. The GDP per capita adjusted for purchasing power was €31,500, or 105% of the EU27 average the same year.

== See also ==
  - Northwest Italy
  - Northeast Italy
  - South Italy
  - Insular Italy
- Northern Italy
- Southern Italy
