= David F. Dorr =

David F. Dorr (c. 1827-c.1872) was an American writer based in Cincinnati, Ohio in the late 1850s. He self-published a travel book in 1858, entitled A Colored Man Round the World, which details his experiences traveling between 1851-1854 to England, France, Switzerland, Brussels, Italy, Greece, Egypt, and Israel, among other countries, while still enslaved.

== Biography ==
Born into slavery in New Orleans, Louisiana, Dorr was compelled to accompany his enslaver, Cornelius Fellowes, on an extended world tour in 1851. According to Lloyd S. Kramer, Fellowes may have been Dorr's biological father.

Upon their return to the United States, Dorr found to his chagrin that Fellowes "failed to keep his promise of freeing him." In 1862, Dorr enlisted in the 7th Ohio infantry, but was wounded at the Battle of Ringgold Gap and was discharged in August 1864.

== A Colored Man Round the World ==
Dorr self-published a travel book of his experiences abroad in 1858 after absconding from Fellowes' control and arriving in the free state of Ohio. As its title testifies, A Colored Man Round the World is explicit about Dorr's ethnicity and his struggle for freedom, especially in the Preface. He articulates a historical pride, derived from travel in Egypt, in his African heritage, explaining, "If the ruins of the Author's ancestors were not a living language of their scientific majesty, this book could receive no such appellation with pride."

The work's dedication also clarifies Dorr's resistance to the slavery system, which has separated him from his maternal parent:

TO MY SLAVE MOTHER.

Mother! wherever thou art, whether in Heaven or a lesser world; or whether around the freedom Base of a Bunker Hill, or only at the lowest savannah of American Slavery, thou art the same to me, and I dedicate this token of my knowledge to thee mother, Oh, my own mother!

YOUR DAVID.

The twenty-three chapters that follow return to 1851 to chart Dorr's views of Europe, various countries in the East, and Egypt, all of which provoke reflections on his own position in the world as an enslaved man of color.

== Works ==
A Colored Man Round the World (1858)
