= Santa Maria del Suffragio, L'Aquila =

Church building in L'Aquila, Italy

Coordinates: 42°20′54″N 13°23′53″E

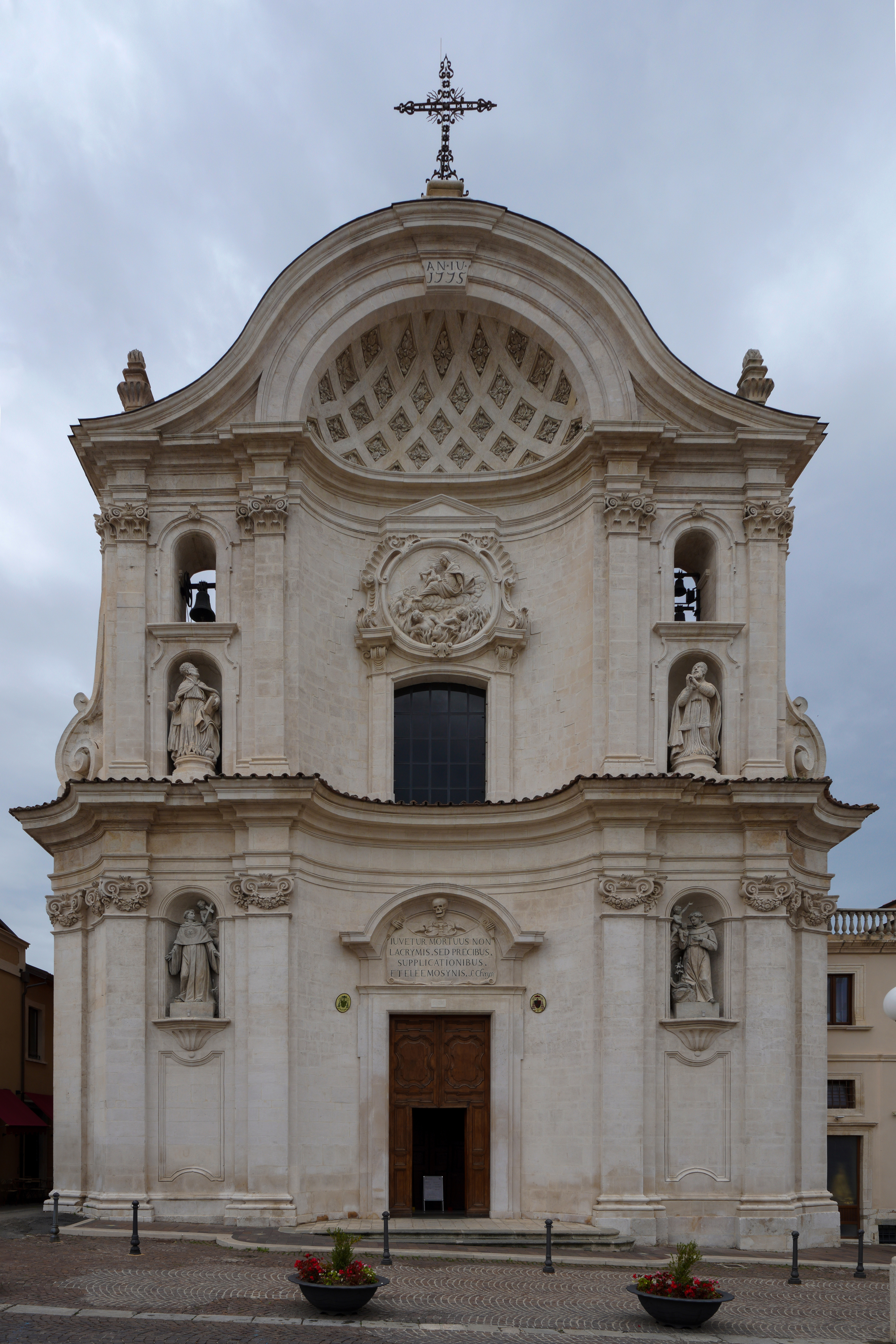
The church before being damaged in the 2009 L'Aquila earthquake.

Santa Maria del Suffragio, commonly called the church of Anima Sante (Blessed Souls), is an 18th-century church in L'Aquila, central Italy.

It was begun on October 10, 1713, ten years after the 1703 L'Aquila earthquake damaged the Confraternita del Suffragio's former seat.

The architect was Carlo Buratti. In 1770 Gianfrancesco Leomporri added a Baroque façade, and in 1805 the church was completed with a neoclassical dome by Giuseppe Valadier.

The 2009 L'Aquila earthquake on April 6, 2009, damaged it and almost entirely destroyed its dome.
