= Nuova Enciclopedia Italiana =

The Nuova Enciclopedia Italiana (1875-1888) was a general knowledge, illustrated, Italian-language encyclopedia edited by economist Gerolamo Boccardo and published in Turin.
