= South Italy =

South Italy Italia meridionale (Italian) Sud Italia (Italian)
- Statistical region
- Country: Italy
- Regions: List: Abruzzo; Apulia; Basilicata; Calabria; Campania; Molise

Area
  - Total: 73,799.56 km^{2} (28,494.17 sq mi)

Population (2026)
  - Total: 13,339,994
  - Density: 180.7598/km^{2} (468.1657/sq mi)
- Languages
  - Official language: Italian
  - Official linguistic minorities: Arbëresh; Calabrian Greek; Griko dialect; Serbo-Croatian
  - Regional languages: Neapolitan

South Italy (Italian: Italia meridionale or Sud Italia) is one of the five official statistical regions of Italy used by the National Institute of Statistics (ISTAT), a first level NUTS region and a European Parliament constituency. South Italy encompasses six of the country's 20 regions:

- Abruzzo
- Apulia
- Basilicata
- Calabria
- Campania
- Molise

South Italy is defined only for statistical and electoral purposes. It should not be confused with the Mezzogiorno, or Southern Italy, which refers to the areas of the former Kingdom of the Two Sicilies (once including the southern half of the Italian peninsula and Sicily) with the usual addition of the Western Mediterranean island of Sardinia. The latter and Sicily form a distinct statistical region, called Insular Italy.

== Geography ==
South Italy borders central Italy to the northwest, while it is washed by the Adriatic Sea to the northeast, the Ionian Sea to the southeast, and the Tyrrhenian Sea to the southwest.

The territory of South Italy is predominantly hilly and mountainous. The largest plains are the Tavoliere delle Puglie (second largest plain on the Italian peninsula), the Tavoliere salentino, the Campania plain, the Sele plain, the Metaponto plain, the Sibari plain, and the Gioia Tauro plain. It is crossed from north to south by the Apennine Mountains, whose highest mountain is the Gran Sasso d'Italia (2,912 m or 9,554 ft).

=== Regions ===
Region	Capital	Population (2026)	Area (km²)	Density (inh./km²)
Abruzzo	L'Aquila	1,267,222	10,831.84	117.0
Apulia	Bari	3,865,277	19,540.90	197.8
Basilicata	Potenza	525,281	10,073.32	52.1
Calabria	Catanzaro	1,827,571	15,221.90	120.1
Campania	Naples	5,568,703	13,670.95	407.3
Molise	Campobasso	285,940	4,460.65	64.1

== Demographics ==
As of 2026, the population is 13,339,994, of which 49.0% are male, and 51.0% are female. Minors make up 15.1% of the population, and seniors make up 24.1%.

Historical population
Year	Pop.	±%
1861	6,614,467	—
1871	6,983,465	+5.6%
1881	7,417,653	+6.2%
1901	8,297,080	+11.9%
1911	8,821,151	+6.3%
1921	9,341,451	+5.9%
1931	9,799,622	+4.9%
1936	10,243,425	+4.5%
1951	11,922,652	+16.4%
1961	12,435,638	+4.3%
1971	12,719,751	+2.3%
1981	13,552,281	+6.5%
1991	13,922,850	+2.7%
2001	13,914,865	−0.1%
2011	13,977,431	+0.4%
2021	13,512,083	−3.3%
Source: ISTAT

=== Largest cities ===
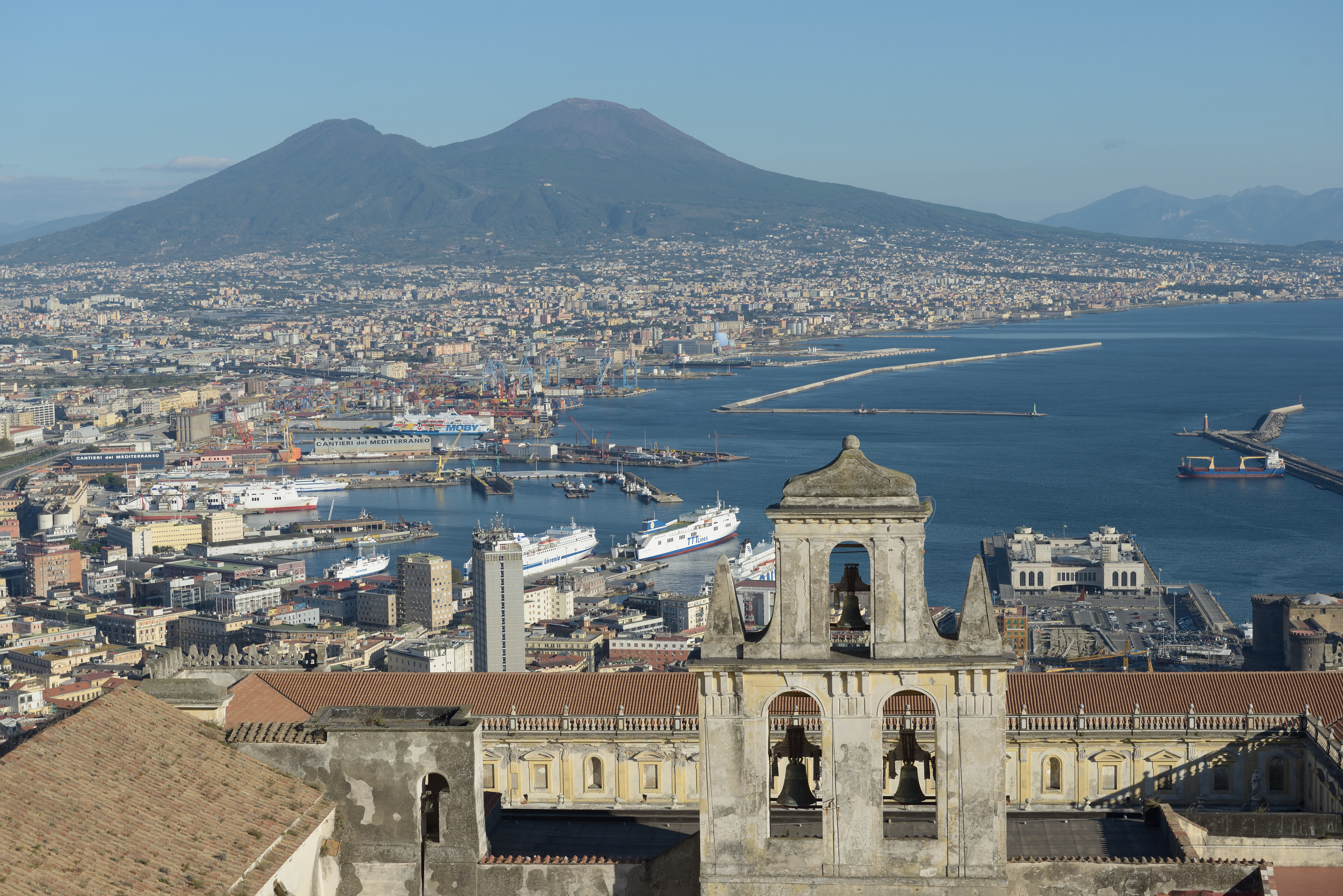
Naples

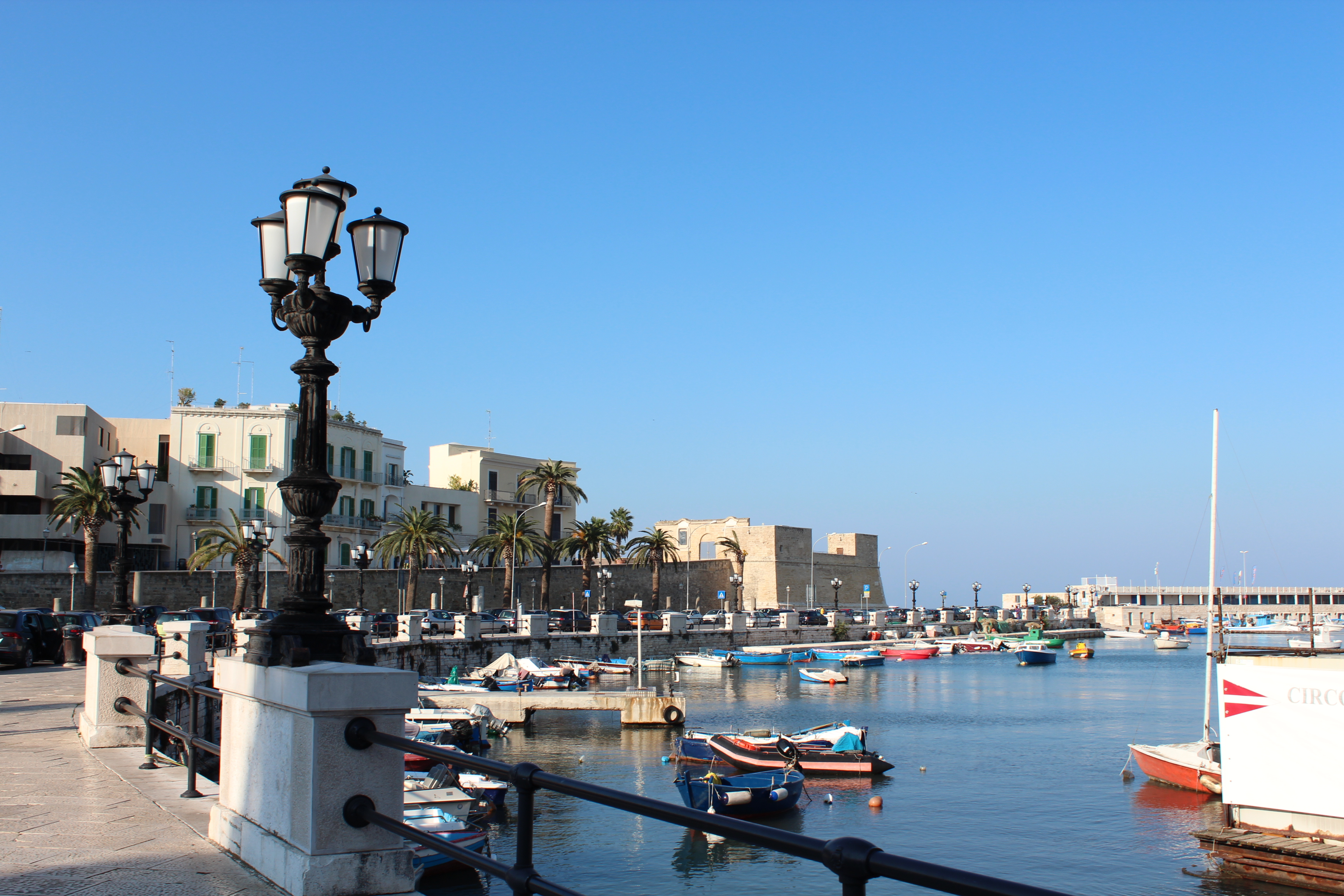
Bari

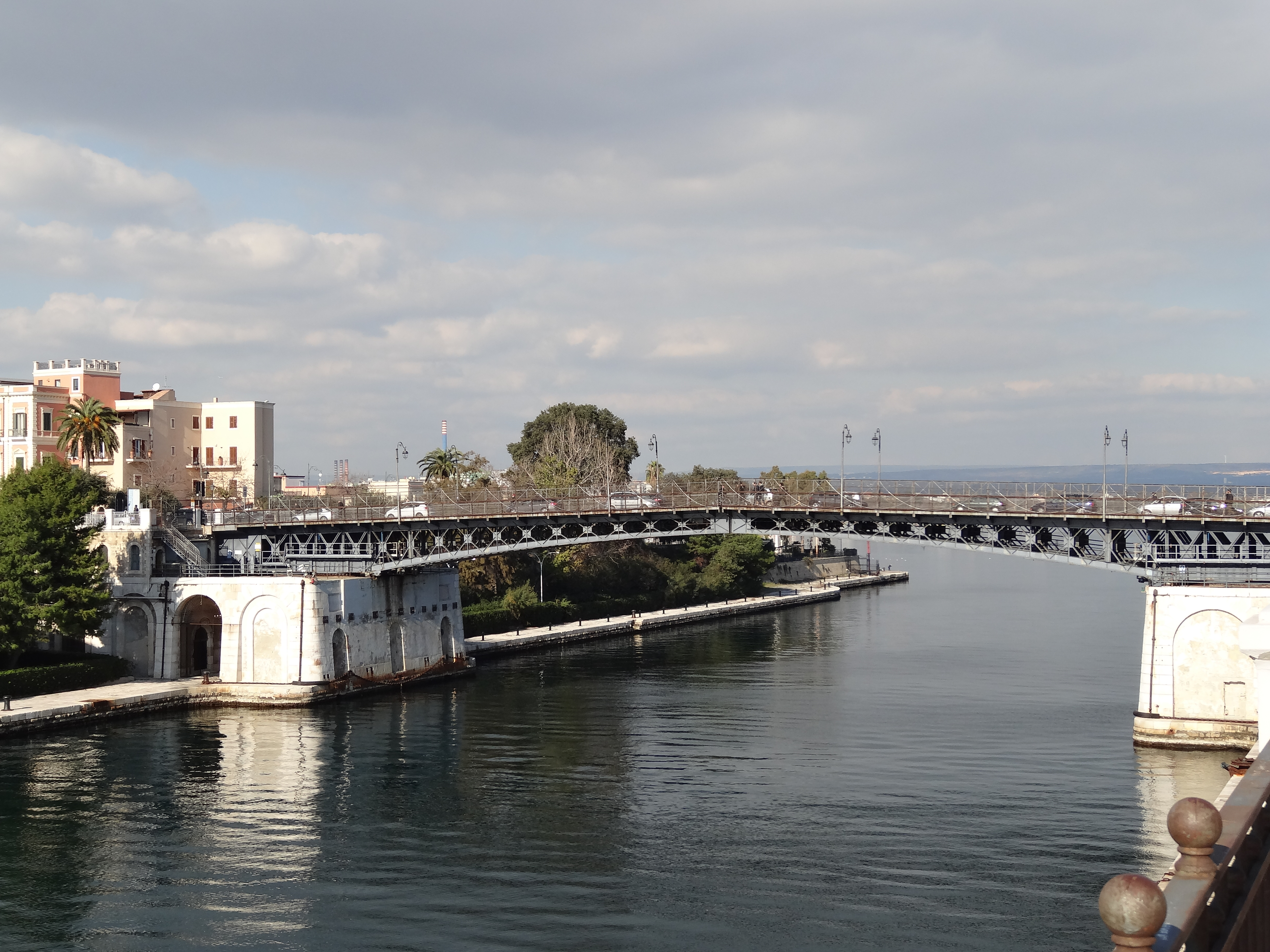
Taranto

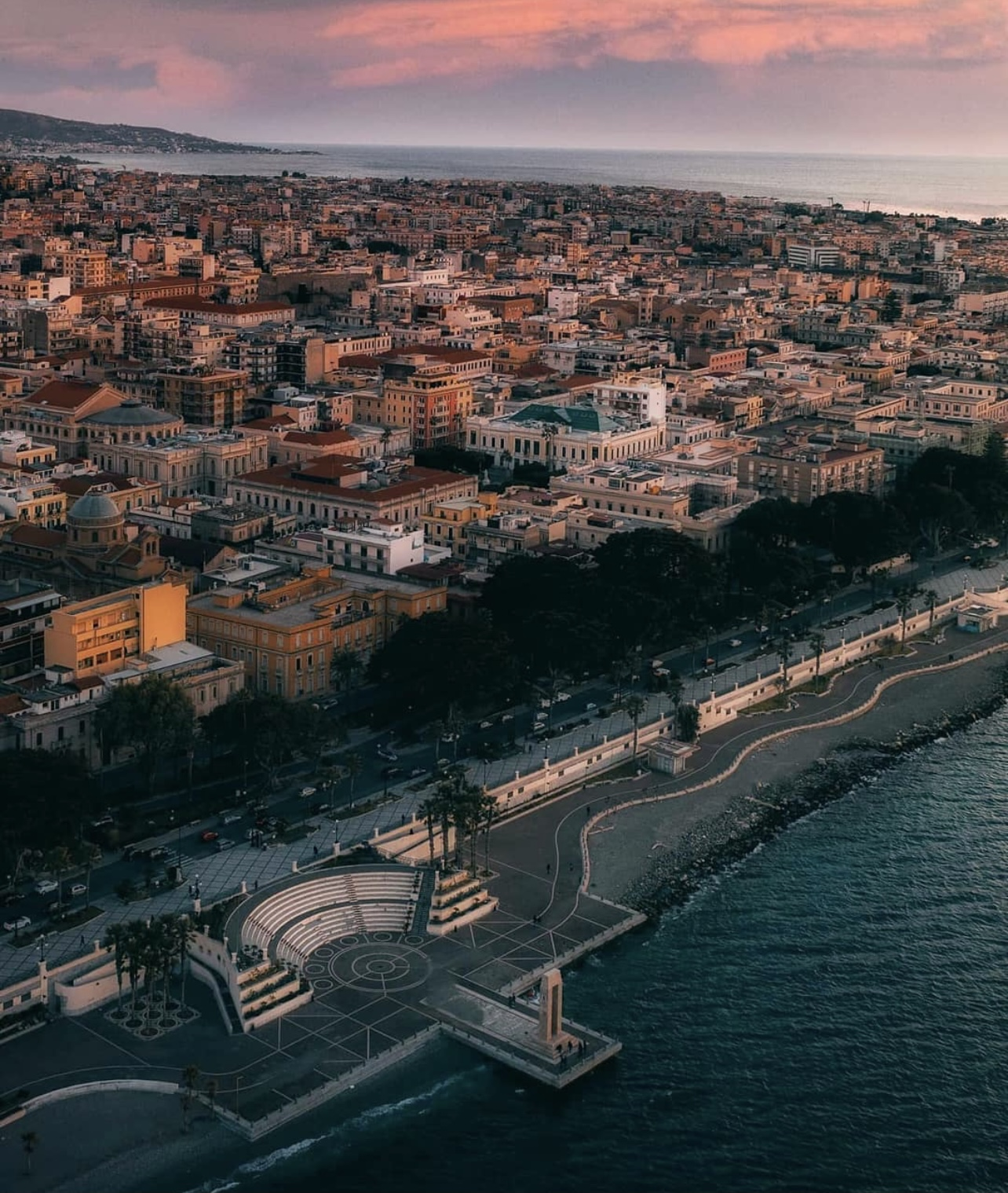
Reggio Calabria

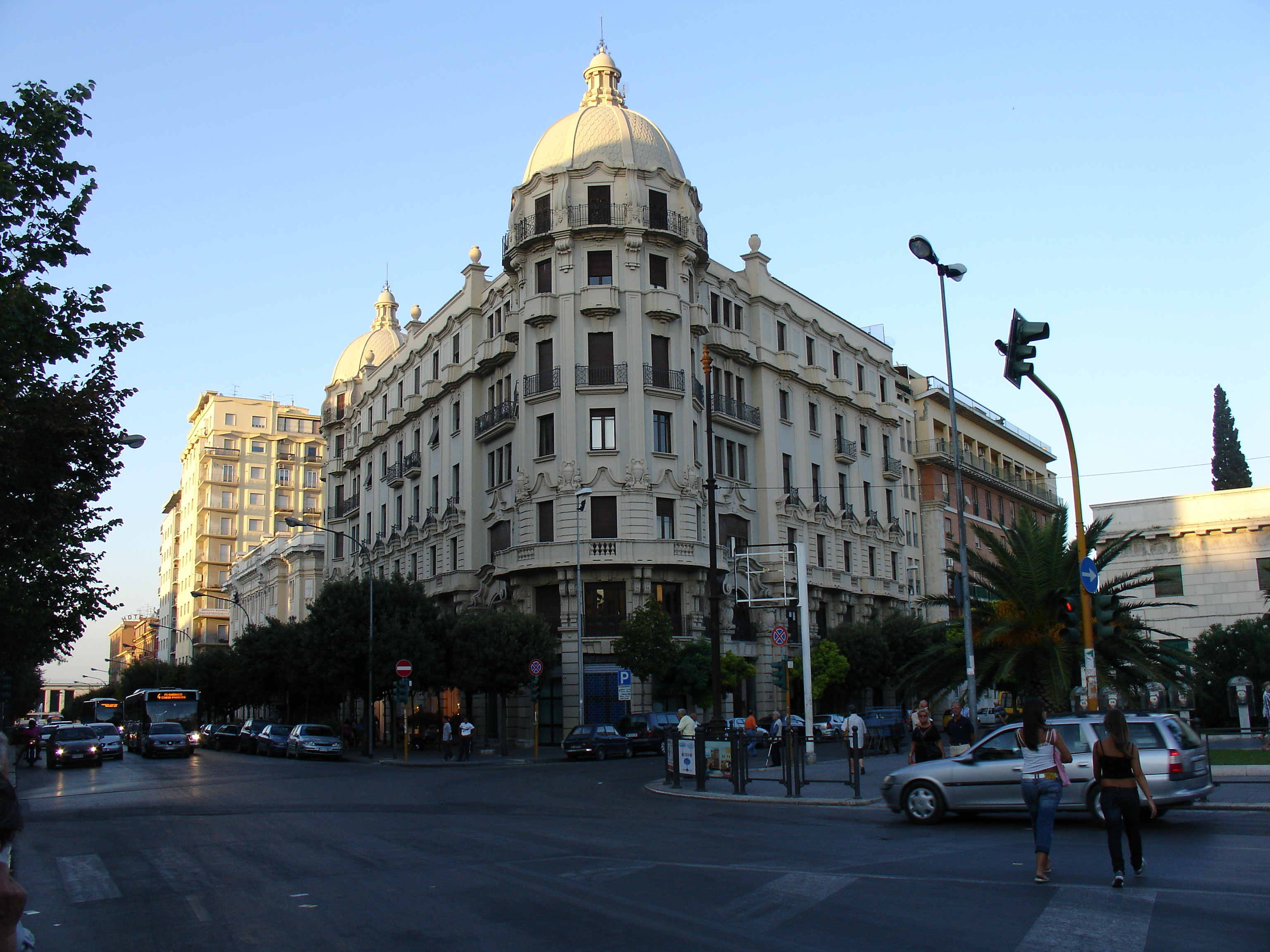
Foggia

The most populous cities with more than 50,000 inhabitants are:

City	Region	Population (2026)
Naples	Campania	905,050
Bari	Apulia	316,248
Taranto	Apulia	185,112
Reggio Calabria	Calabria	167,925
Foggia	Apulia	145,078
Salerno	Campania	125,323
Giugliano in Campania	Campania	125,018
Pescara	Abruzzo	118,487
Andria	Apulia	96,520
Lecce	Apulia	94,387
Barletta	Apulia	92,067
Catanzaro	Calabria	82,708
Brindisi	Apulia	81,181
Torre del Greco	Campania	78,839
Pozzuoli	Campania	74,665
Corigliano-Rossano	Calabria	74,403
Casoria	Campania	73,257
Caserta	Campania	72,757
L'Aquila	Abruzzo	70,803
Altamura	Apulia	70,336
Lamezia Terme	Calabria	67,005
Cosenza	Calabria	63,449
Potenza	Basilicata	63,403
Castellammare di Stabia	Campania	61,937
Afragola	Campania	61,581
Matera	Basilicata	59,368
Acerra	Campania	58,585
Crotone	Calabria	58,136
Marano di Napoli	Campania	57,631
Molfetta	Apulia	57,016
Cerignola	Apulia	56,711
Benevento	Campania	55,330
Trani	Apulia	54,731
Montesilvano	Abruzzo	53,557
Bisceglie	Apulia	53,242
Manfredonia	Apulia	53,015
Bitonto	Apulia	52,868
Avellino	Campania	51,819
Teramo	Abruzzo	51,400
Portici	Campania	51,213

=== Immigration ===
As of 2025, immigrants make up 7.0% of the population. The 5 largest foreign countries of birth are Romania, Ukraine, Morocco, Germany, and Switzerland.

== Economy ==
The gross domestic product (GDP) of the region was 271.1 billion euro in 2018, accounting for 15.4% of Italy's economic output. The GDP per capita adjusted for purchasing power was 19,300 euro, or 64% of the EU27 average in the same year.

== See also ==
- National Institute of Statistics (Italy)
- NUTS statistical regions of Italy
- Italian NUTS level 1 regions:
  - Northwest Italy
  - Northeast Italy
  - Insular Italy
- Northern Italy
- Central Italy
- Southern Italy
