= Timeline of Brescia =

The following is a timeline of the history of the city of Brescia in the Lombardy region of Italy.

== Prior to 15th century ==
- 350 BCE – Celtic Cenomani take Brixia (ancient city) from the Etruscans (approximate date).
- 225 BCE – Gallic Cenomani Brixia allies with Rome.
- 89 BCE – Brixia "granted Latin citizenship."
- 49 BCE – Brixia granted "Roman citizenship."
- 7 CE – Brixia becomes part of the Regio X Venetia et Histria.
- 73 CE – Capitolium of Brixia built.
- 320 CE – Roman Catholic Diocese of Brescia established (approximate date).
- 387 – Gaudentius of Brescia becomes bishop.
- 452 – Brescia sacked by forces of Attila.
- 562 – Lombards in power.
- 753 – San Salvatore monastery founded.
- 756 – Desiderius in power.
- 1100 - Old Cathedral, Brescia construction begins.
- 1135-1138 – The commune of Brescia revolts against the Bishop Manfred.
- 1139 - Bishop Manfred, having received Pope Innocent II's support, has Arnold of Brescia exiled.
- 1167 – Brescia active member of the Lombard League.
- 1222 – 25 December: 1222 Brescia earthquake.
- 1235 – Broletto palace built.
- 1238 – Attempted siege by forces of Frederick II, Holy Roman Emperor.
- 1258 – Scaligeri in power.
- 1266 – Charles of Anjou in power.
- 1339 – Visconti in power.

== 15th–19th centuries ==
- 1421 - Visconti of Milan in power.
- 1426 – Venetians in power.
- 1438–1440 — Siege of Brescia by the Milanese
- 1473 – Printing press in operation.
- 1478 – Plague.
- 1487 – Santa Maria dei Miracoli church construction begins.
- 1512 – 19 February: Sack of Brescia by French forces during the War of the League of Cambrai.^{(it)}
- 1563 – Accademia degli Occulti founded.
- 1574
  - Palazzo della Loggia completed.
  - Guazzo's Civil Conversazione (etiquette book) published in Brescia.
- 1604 – New Cathedral construction begins.
- 1745 – Biblioteca Queriniana (library) founded.
- 1769 – 18 August: Lightning causes explosion.
- 1797
  - Venetian rule ends; Brescia becomes part of the French client Cisalpine Republic.
  - Broletto palace destroyed by French forces.
- 1805 – Brescia becomes part of the Napoleonic Kingdom of Italy.
- 1813 – Monumental cemetery of Brescia established.
- 1814 – Austrians in power.
- 1848 – March: Political unrest.
- 1849 – Uprising against Austrian rule; crackdown.
- 1850 – August: Flood.
- 1854 - Brescia railway station opened.
- 1859
  - June: Garibaldi and the Cacciatori delle Alpi military unit enter city.
  - Brescia becomes part of the Kingdom of Sardinia.
  - Provincial Circondario di Brescia (district) established.
- 1875 – Dismantling of city walls begins.
- 1882 – Brescia tram begins operating.
- 1888 – Banca San Paolo di Brescia (bank) established.
- 1897 – Population: 67,923.

== 20th century ==
- 1901 - Population: 72,731.
- 1909 – Aerodrome built.
- 1911
  - Population: 83,338.
  - Brescia Calcio (football club) formed.
- 1913 - Zoo of Brescia Castle opened.
- 1919 - Brescia University College opened as Ursuline College.
- 1925
  - Morcelliana publisher in business.
  - Brescia University established.
- 1927 – Mille Miglia car race begins.
- 1932 – Piazza della Vittoria (Brescia) remodelled.
- 1936 – Brescia trolleybus begins operating.
- 1944 – Bombing of Brescia in World War II.
- 1945
  - Bombing.
  - Giornale di Brescia newspaper begins publication.
- 1948 – Bruno Boni (politician) becomes mayor (until 1975).
- 1959 - Stadio Mario Rigamonti opened.
- 1974
  - 28 May: Piazza della Loggia bombing.
  - Bresciaoggi Nuovo newspaper begins publication.
- 1982 – University of Brescia established.
- 1988 - Zoo of Brescia Castle closed.
- 1992 – Paolo Corsini becomes mayor.
- 1999 – Museo di Santa Giulia (museum) established.

== 21st century ==
- 2013
  - Local election held; Emilio Del Bono becomes mayor.
  - Population: 188,520.
  - Brescia Metro opens.

== See also ==
- History of Brescia
- List of mayors of Brescia
- List of bishops of Brescia
- List of presidents of the Province of Brescia, 1861–present
- Timeline of the Republic of Venice, of which Brescia was part 1426-1797
- History of Lombardy (it)

Timelines of other cities in the macroregion of Northwest Italy:^{(it)}

- Liguria region: Timeline of Genoa
- Lombardy region: Timeline of Bergamo; Cremona; Mantua; Milan; Pavia
- Piedmont region: Timeline of Novara; Turin

== Bibliography ==
=== in English ===
- William Henry Overall, ed. (1870). "Brescia". Dictionary of Chronology. London: William Tegg. hdl:2027/uc2.ark:/13960/t9m32q949.
- William Smith, ed. (1872) [1854]. "Brixia". Dictionary of Greek and Roman Geography. London: John Murray. hdl:2027/hvd.ah5cuq.
- "Brescia", Hand-book for Travellers in Northern Italy (16th ed.), London: John Murray, 1897, OCLC 2231483
- Ashby, Thomas (1910). "Brescia" . Encyclopædia Britannica. Vol. 4 (11th ed.). p. 498.
- Benjamin Vincent (1910), "Brescia", Haydn's Dictionary of Dates (25th ed.), London: Ward, Lock & Co., hdl:2027/uc2.ark:/13960/t41r6xh8t
- Edward Hutton (1912), "Brescia", Cities of Lombardy, New York: Macmillan Co.
- "Brescia", Northern Italy (14th ed.), Leipzig: Karl Baedeker, 1913 (+ 1870 ed.)
- Roy Domenico (2002). "Lombardy: Brescia". Regions of Italy: a Reference Guide to History and Culture. Greenwood. pp. 188+. ISBN 0313307334.
- Lawrin Armstrong (2004). "Brescia". In Christopher Kleinhenz (ed.). Medieval Italy: an Encyclopedia. Routledge. pp. 155–157. ISBN 0415939291.

=== in Italian ===
- Pietro Bravo. Delle storie bresciane (in Italian). 1839–1843 (5 volumes)
- Federico Odorici. Storie bresciane (in Italian). Pietro di Lor. Gilberti. 1853–1865 (11 volumes)
- Federico Odorici (1858). Guida di Brescia (in Italian). F. Cavalieri.
- "Brescia". Nuova Enciclopedia Italiana (in Italian) (6th ed.). Turin: Unione Tipografico-Editrice Torinese. 1877. hdl:2027/uc1.c2649802.
- Nicola Bernardini, ed. (1890). "Provincia di Brescia". Guida della stampa periodica italiana (in Italian). Lecce: R. Tipografia editrice salentina dei fratelli Spacciante. hdl:2027/njp.32101074983378.* Club Alpino Italiano (1903). Guida di Brescia artistica (in Italian). Enrico Castoldi, coi tipi delll' [sic] Unione Tipo-Litografica Bresciana.
- "Brescia". Piemonte, Lombardia, Canton Ticino. Guida d'Italia (in Italian). Milan: Touring Club Italiano. 1916. p. 371+. hdl:2027/uiuo.ark:/13960/t1rf92c9w.
- "Brescia", Enciclopedia Italiana (in Italian), 1930
- Giovanni Treccani (ed.). Storia di Brescia (in Italian). Morcelliana. OCLC 8793953. 1963–1964
- Antonio Fappani. Brescia in Enciclopedia bresciana, Editrice Voce del Popolo, Brescia, 1975.
- Brescia. Le città nella storia d'Italia (in Italian). 1989.
- Gino Bambara and Giuseppe Pea. Bombardamenti su Brescia, 1944–1945. Mostra fotografica (Brescia: Associazione Culturale Neo Umanesimo, 1996)

Gianluigi Valotti, Il ricordo dei Prodi bresciani e dei Caduti del 1859 nel Cimitero Vantiniano di Brescia, Bornato, Sardini Editrice, 2016, ISBN 978-88-7506-227-9

Gianluigi Valotti, Brescia 1859. Il Vantiniano accoglie le spoglie delle armate europee, Brescia, Fondazione Negri, 2017. ISBN 978-88-89108-36-9Brescia 1849. I caduti delle dieci giornate di Gianluigi Valotti - La Compagnia della Stampa - 2018: ISBN 9788884867520
