= Timeline of Mantua =

The following is a timeline of the history of the city of Mantua in the Lombardy region of Italy.

== Prior to 17th century ==
- 3rd C. BCE - Romans in power.
- 601 CE - Forces of Lombard Agilulf take Mantua.
- 804 CE - Roman Catholic Diocese of Mantua established.
- 977 - Canossa in power.
- 1007 - Boniface III in power.
- 1090 - Henry IV, Holy Roman Emperor in power.
- 1113 - Forces of Matilda of Tuscany take Mantua.
- 1115 - Mantua becomes a "quasi-independent commune."
- 1150 - Mantua currency begins circulating.
- 1167 - Mantua joins the Lombard League.}
- 1236 - Forces of Frederick II, Holy Roman Emperor attempt to take Mantua.
- 1272 - Bonacolsi in power (until 1328).
- 1281 - Tower built.
- 1328
  - Ludovico I Gonzaga in power.
  - Ducal Palace, Mantua built.
- 1400 - Public clock installed (approximate date).
- 1403 - Mantua Cathedral rebuilt.
- 1406 - Castle of St. George (Mantua) built.
- 1423 - "Latin grammar school" established by Vittorino da Feltre.
- 1444 - Ludovico II Gonzaga, Marquis of Mantua in power.
- 1460 - Artist Andrea Mantegna moves to Mantua.
- 1472
  - Printing press in operation.
  - Rebuilding of the Basilica of Sant'Andrea begins.
- 1480 - Poliziano's Fabula di Orfeo premieres in Mantua.
- 1484 - Francesco II Gonzaga, Marquess of Mantua in power.
- 1490 - Isabella d'Este becomes wife of Francesco II.
- 1530 - Duchy of Mantua established.
- 1535 - Palazzo del Te built near Mantua.
- 1584 - Jesuit college established.^{(it)}

== 17th-19th centuries ==
- 1607 - Monteverdi's opera L'Orfeo premieres in Mantua.
- 1625 - Jesuit Pacifico Ginnasio Mantovano (university) established.
- 1630
  - City sacked by Austrian forces during the War of the Mantuan Succession.
  - Plague.
- 1631 - War of the Mantuan Succession ends; Mantuan Gonzaga-Nevers rulers become "vassals of Vienna" per Treaty of Cherasco.
- 1664 - Gazzetta di Mantova newspaper begins publication.
- 1686 - Accademia Virgiliana founded.
- 1708
  - Death of Ferdinando Carlo Gonzaga, Duke of Mantua and Montferrat the last ruler of the Duchy of Mantua.
  - Austrians in power.
- 1737 - Mantua becomes part of Lombardy.
- 1767 - Teatro Bibiena built.
- 1768 - "Reale Accademia di Scienze e Belle Lettere" (now, Accademia Nazionale Virgiliana di Scienze Lettere ed Arti) founded.
- 1779 - "Museum of antiquities" established.
- 1780 - Biblioteca Teresiana (library) established.
- 1796 - 4 June: Siege of Mantua (1796–97) by French forces begins.
- 1797
  - 2 February: Siege of Mantua ends; French win.
  - City becomes seat of the "Mincio department in Napoleon's puppet Cisalpine Republic."
- 1799 - Siege of Mantua (1799) by Austrian forces; Austrians win.
- 1801 - French in power again per Treaty of Lunéville.
- 1809 - Economic unrest.
- 1814 - Austrians in power again.
- 1822 - Teatro Sociale (Mantua) built.
- 1853 - Political dissidents executed at nearby Belfiore during the Italian unification movement.
- 1866 - Mantua becomes part of the Kingdom of Italy.
- 1868 - State Archives of Mantua (state archives) established.
- 1871 - Banca Agricola Mantovana (bank) in business.
- 1873 - Mantua railway station opens.
- 1884 - Economic unrest; military crackdown.
- 1886 - Mantoua-Asola Tram begins operating.
- 1887 - La Provincia di Mantova newspaper begins publication.
- 1897 - Population: 29,743.

== 20th century ==
- 1905 - Walls of Mantua demolished.
- 1906 - Population: 31,783.
- 1908 - Mantua tram begins operating.
- 1911
  - Mantova F.C. (football club) formed.
  - Population: 32,657.
- 1913 - Chamber of Commerce built.
- 1930 - Virgil monument erected.
- 1934 - Ferrovia Mantova-Peschiera (railway) begins operating.
- 1949
  - Azienda Pubblici Autoservizi Mantova (bus) begins operating.
  - Stadio Danilo Martelli (stadium) opens.
- 1971 - Population: 65,703.
- 1973 - Gianni Usvardi becomes mayor.

== 21st century ==
- 2005 - PalaBam arena opens.
- 2006 - Mincio Cycleway constructed between Peschiera del Garda and Mantua.
- 2012 - May: Earthquake.
- 2013 - Population: 47,223.
- 2015 - Mattia Palazzi becomes mayor.

== See also ==
- History of Mantua (Italian version includes timeline)
- List of rulers of Mantua, 984-1708
- List of podestàs of Mantua, 1184-1400
- List of dukes of Mantua, 1530–1708
- List of mayors of Mantua
- History of Lombardy (it)

Timelines of other cities in the macroregion of Northwest Italy:^{(it)}

- Liguria region: Timeline of Genoa
- Lombardy region: Timeline of Bergamo; Brescia; Cremona; Milan; Pavia
- Piedmont region: Timeline of Novara; Turin

== Bibliography ==
- Virgil. "Part 10". Aeneid. (description of Mantua)

=== in English ===
- William Smith, ed. (1872) [1854]. "Mantua". Dictionary of Greek and Roman Geography. London: John Murray. hdl:2027/hvd.ah5cur.
- "Mantua", Hand-book for Travellers in Northern Italy (16th ed.), London: John Murray, 1897, OCLC 2231483
- "Mantua". Chambers's Encyclopaedia. London. 1901. hdl:2027/njp.32101065312926.
- Ismar Elbogen (1904), "Mantua", Jewish Encyclopedia, vol. 8, New York
- "Mantua" . Encyclopædia Britannica. Vol. 17 (11th ed.). 1910. pp. 607–608.
- Benjamin Vincent (1910), "Mantua", Haydn's Dictionary of Dates (25th ed.), London: Ward, Lock & Co., hdl:2027/uc2.ark:/13960/t41r6xh8t
- Edward Hutton (1912), "Mantua", Cities of Lombardy, New York: Macmillan Co.
- "Mantua", Northern Italy (14th ed.), Leipzig: Karl Baedeker, 1913 + 1870 ed.
- Egerton R. Williams Jr. (1914), "Mantua (etc.)", Lombard Towns of Italy, London: Smith, Elder & Co.
- Monique Lamontagne (1995). "Mantua". In Trudy Ring; Robert M. Salkin (eds.). Southern Europe. International Dictionary of Historic Places. Vol. 3. Fitzroy Dearborn. pp. 416–419. ISBN 1884964052.
- Roy Domenico (2002). "Lombardy: Mantua". Regions of Italy: a Reference Guide to History and Culture. Greenwood. pp. 197+. ISBN 0313307334.
- Christopher Kleinhenz, ed. (2004). "Mantua". Medieval Italy: an Encyclopedia. Routledge. ISBN 0415939291.
- David S. Chambers (2010). "The Gonzaga Signoria, communal institutions, and the 'honour of the city': mixed ideas in quattrocento Mantua". In John E. Law; Bernadette Paton (eds.). Communes and Despots in Medieval and Renaissance Italy. Ashgate. ISBN 978-0-7546-6508-3.
- Charles M. Rosenberg, ed. (2010). Court Cities of Northern Italy: Milan, Parma, Piacenza, Mantua, Ferrara, Bologna, Urbino, Pesaro, and Rimini. Cambridge University Press. ISBN 978-0-521-79248-6.

=== in Italian ===
- Leopoldo Cammillo Volta. Compendio cronologico-critico della storia di Mantova dalla sua fondazione sino ai nostri tempi (in Italian). dalla tipografia di Francesco Agazzi. 1807-1837 (5 volumes)
- Antonio Cavagna Sangiuliani [in Italian] (1865). Storia di Mantova dalla sua origine fino all' anno 1860 (in Italian). E. Caranenti.
- Giovanni Battista Intra (1882). Dell' archivio storico mantovano (in Italian). Milan: L. Bortolotti.
- "Mantova". Piemonte, Lombardia, Canton Ticino. Guida d'Italia (in Italian). Milan: Touring Club Italiano. 1916. p. 453+. hdl:2027/uiuo.ark:/13960/t1rf92c9w.
- Vasco Restori (1919). Mantova; notizie storico-artistiche sotto forma di guida (in Italian). Società tipografica editrice mantovana.
- G. Coniglio; L. Mazzoldi (eds.). Mantova: La storia (in Italian). 1958–1963 (3 volumes)
- Carlo A. Ferandini; E.O. Zavatti (1973), Mantova, l'aviazione mantovana e il Migliaretto nei secoli, Tradizioni aeronautiche delle citta italiane (Aeronautical Traditions of Italian Towns) (in Italian), Rome: Stato maggiore dell'Aeronautica Militare, OCLC 19127680
- Luigi Cavazzoli. La gente e la guerra. La vita quotidiana del fronte interno: Mantova, 1940-1945 (Milan: Angeli, 1989).
- Clara Castagnoli; Giancarlo Ciaramelli, eds. (2002). Un secolo di stampa periodica mantovana: 1797-1897 (in Italian). Milan: FrancoAngeli. ISBN 978-88-464-3756-3.
- Giada Bologni and Giorgio Casamatti. Bombe su Mantova: La città e la provincia durante i bombardamenti (1943-1945) (Parma: MUP, 2009)
