= Timeline of Pavia =

Historical timeline of Pavia, Italy

The following is a timeline of the history of the city of Pavia in the Lombardy region of Italy.

== Prior to 18th century ==
- 220 BCE - Romans in power; settlement named Ticinum (approximate date).
- 397 CE - Roman Catholic Diocese of Pavia established (approximate date).
- 452 CE - Pavia sacked by Hun forces of Attila.
- 475 - Pavia sacked during conflict between forces of Odoacer and Roman Orestes.
- 540 - Following the Byzantine conquest of Ravenna, Pavia becomes de Facto capital of the reduced Ostrogothic kingdom.
- 569 - Siege of Pavia (569–72) by Lombard forces begins.
- 572 - Lombards in power.
- 773-774 - Siege of Pavia (773–74); Frankish forces of Charlemagne win.
- 887 - Coronation of Berengar I as king of Italy takes place in Pavia.
- 924 - Pavia besieged by Hungarian forces.
- 950 - Coronation of Berengar II and Adalbert as kings of Italy.
- 951 - Marriage of Otto I and Adelaide.
- 971 - Pietro Campanora becomes bishop.
- 11th century - Civic Tower (Pavia) built.
- 1024 - Palazzo Reale (Pavia) (royal palace) destroyed.
- 1056 - Milan-Pavia conflict.
- 1132 - San Pietro in Ciel d'Oro church consecrated.
- 1155
  - San Michele Maggiore church rebuilt.
  - Coronation of Frederick I, Holy Roman Emperor.
- 1198 - Broletto, Pavia (assembly area) built.
- 1315 - Pavia attacked by Ghibelline forces.
- 1354 - Ponte Coperto (covered bridge) rebuilt.
- 1356 - Pavia besieged by forces of Visconti.
- 1359 - Galeazzo II Visconti in power.
- 1361 - Studium Generale founded.
- 1363 - Petrarch moves to Pavia.
- 1365 - Castello Visconteo (castle) built.
- 1374 - Santa Maria del Carmine church construction begins.
- 1447 - Young Christopher Columbus studies at the Studium Generale (approximate date).
- 1473 - Printing press in operation.
- 1485 - University of Pavia active.
- 1488 - Cathedral of San Martino construction begins.
- 1495 - Certosa di Pavia (monastery) built near town.
- 1499 - Principality of Pavia established.
- 1521 - Giovanni Maria Ciocchi del Monte becomes bishop.
- 1525 - Battle of Pavia fought during the Italian War of 1521–26.
- 1527 - Sack of Pavia (1527) by French forces.
- 1561 - University's Collegio Borromeo established.
- 1567 - University's Ghislieri College established.

== 18th-19th centuries ==
- 1706 - Pavia occupied by Austrian forces.
- 1733 - Pavia occupied by French forces.
- 1743 - Pavia occupied by French and Spanish forces.
- 1746 - Austrians in power.
- 1771 - University's Natural History Museum founded.
- 1772 - Biblioteca universitaria di Pavia (library) established.
- 1773
  - Teatro Fraschini (theatre) opens.
  - Orto Botanico dell'Università di Pavia (garden) founded.
- 1796 - May: Pavia sacked by French forces.
- 1814 - Austrian rule restored.
- 1830 - Birth of Luigi Cremona, later an Italian mathematician.
- 1848 - March: Sardinians in power.
- 1859
  - Pavia becomes part of the Kingdom of Sardinia.
  - Circondario di Pavia (administrative region) established.
- 1862 - Pavia-Cava railway begins operating.
- 1866
  - Ferrovia Pavia-Cremona (railway) begins operating.
  - War monument erected.
- 1867 - Pavia railway station built.
- 1870 - La Provincia Pavese newspaper begins publication.
- 1872 - Fortifications dismantled.
- 1880 - Tranvia Milano-Pavia (tram) begins operating.
- 1882
  - Pavia–Stradella railway begins operating.
  - Covered market built.
- 1884 - Tranvia Pavia-Sant'Angelo Lodigiano (tram) begins operating.
- 1885 - Corriere Ticinese newspaper begins publication.
- 1897 - Population: 39,058.

== 20th century ==
- 1901 - Società Pavese di Storia Patria (historical society) founded.
- 1911
  - A.C. Pavia (football club) formed.
  - Population: 39,898.
- 1913 - Pavia tram begins operating.
- 1951 - Ponte Coperto (bridge) rebuilt.
- 1952 - Pavia trolleybus begins operating.
- 1989 - 17 March: Civic Tower collapses.

== 21st century ==
- 2001 - LINE Servizi per la Mobilità (transit entity) established.
- 2009 - Italian local elections, 2009 held; Alessandro Cattaneo becomes mayor.
- 2013 - Population: 68,313.
- 2014 - Local election held; Massimo Depaoli becomes mayor.

== See also ==
- History of Pavia
- List of mayors of Pavia
- List of bishops of Pavia
- State Archives of Pavia (state archives)
- History of Lombardy (it)

Timelines of other cities in the macroregion of Northwest Italy:^{(it)}

- Liguria region: Timeline of Genoa
- Lombardy region: Timeline of Bergamo; Brescia; Cremona; Mantua; Milan
- Piedmont region: Timeline of Novara; Turin

== Bibliography ==
- Opicinus de Canistris, De laudibus civitatis ticinensis. 14th century

=== in English ===
- William Smith, ed. (1872) [1854]. "Ticinum". Dictionary of Greek and Roman Geography. London: John Murray. hdl:2027/hvd.ah5cur.
- Umberto Cassuto (1905), "Pavia", Jewish Encyclopedia, vol. 9, New York, hdl:2027/msu.31293024395133
- Ashby, Thomas (1910). "Pavia" . Encyclopædia Britannica. Vol. 20 (11th ed.). pp. 970–971.
- Benjamin Vincent (1910), "Pavia", Haydn's Dictionary of Dates (25th ed.), London: Ward, Lock & Co., hdl:2027/uc2.ark:/13960/t41r6xh8t
- "Pavia", Northern Italy (14th ed.), Leipzig: Karl Baedeker, 1913
- Donald A. Bullough (1966), "Urban Change in Early Medieval Italy: The Example of Pavia", Papers of the British School at Rome, 34: 82–130, doi:10.1017/S0068246200007492, JSTOR 40310664, S2CID 163539539
- Charles M. Radding (1988). Origins of Medieval Jurisprudence: Pavia and Bologna, 850-1150. Yale University Press. ISBN 978-0-7837-4539-8.
- Roy Domenico (2002). "Lombardy: Pavia". Regions of Italy: a Reference Guide to History and Culture. Greenwood. pp. 199+. ISBN 0313307334.
- Victoria M. Morse (2004). "Pavia". In Christopher Kleinhenz (ed.). Medieval Italy: an Encyclopedia. Routledge. pp. 862–868. ISBN 0415939291.

=== in Italian ===
- Luigi Malaspina di Sannazaro (1819). Guida di Pavia.
- Carlo Morbio (1840). Ferrara, Pavia e Lodi. Storie dei municipi italiani (in Italian) (2nd ed.). Milan: Manini. OCLC 758844008.
- "Cronaca". Notizie risguardanti la città di Pavia raccolte da un suo cittadino (in Italian). Pavia: Fratelli Fusi. 1876. (Timeline)
- "Pavia". Nuova Enciclopedia Italiana (in Italian). Vol. 16 (6th ed.). Turin: Unione Tipografico-Editrice Torinese. 1884. hdl:2027/uc1.c2649814.
- Nicola Bernardini, ed. (1890). "Provincia di Pavia". Guida della stampa periodica italiana (in Italian). Lecce: R. Tipografia editrice salentina dei fratelli Spacciante. pp. 593+.
- Memorie e documenti per la Storia di Pavia (in Italian) 1894-
- "Pavia", Enciclopedia Italiana (Treccani) (in Italian), 1935
- Società Pavese di Storia Patria. Storia di Pavia. 1984-1992 (3 volumes)
- Musei Civici e Archivio Storico Civico (1988). Pavia. Materiali di storia urbana. Il progetto edilizio 1840-1940. Pavia: Edizioni Mediche Italiane.
