= Timeline of Genoa =

The following is a timeline of the history of the city of Genoa, Liguria, Italy.

== Prior to 16th century ==
Genoa Cathedral was consecrated in 1118

- 5th century BC - First nucleus and oldest inhabited area around the Castello hill.
- 205 BC - The town, ally of Rome during the Second Punic War, was destroyed and sacked by the Carthaginians led by the Punic general Mago Barca, brother of Hannibal.
- 643 AD - Lombards take power (approximate date).
- 900 - Santa Maria di Castello built (approximate date).
- 10th century - Santuario della Madonna del Monte founded.
- 935 - Fatimid sack of Genoa
- 972 - Santo Stefano consecrated.
- 1049 - Santi Cosma e Damiano construction begins.
- 1099 - Republic of Genoa established.
- 1118 - Genoa Cathedral consecrated by Pope Gelasius II
- 1126 - San Matteo founded.
- 1133 - Roman Catholic Archdiocese of Genoa created.
- 1161 - The Knights Templar settle in Genoa in the Santa Fede church.
- 1163 - Porta Soprana, Porta dei Vacca, and Porta Aurea built (approximate date).
- 1180 - Commenda di San Giovanni di Pré established.
- 1189 - San Donato consecrated.
- 1260
  - Palazzo San Giorgio built.
  - Sant'Agostino consecrated.
- 1275 - Doge's Palace built.
- 1284 - Battle of Meloria.
- 1308 - San Bartolomeo degli Armeni founded.
- 1330 - Fortifications expanded (approximate date).
- 1339 - Simone Boccanegra appointed doge.
- 1347 - Black Death plague.
- 1354 - Public clock installed.
- 1407 - Banco di San Giorgio founded.
- 1453 - Oratory of San Giacomo della Marina built.
- 1474 - Printing press in operation (approximate date).
- 1481 - University of Genoa established.

== 16th-18th centuries ==
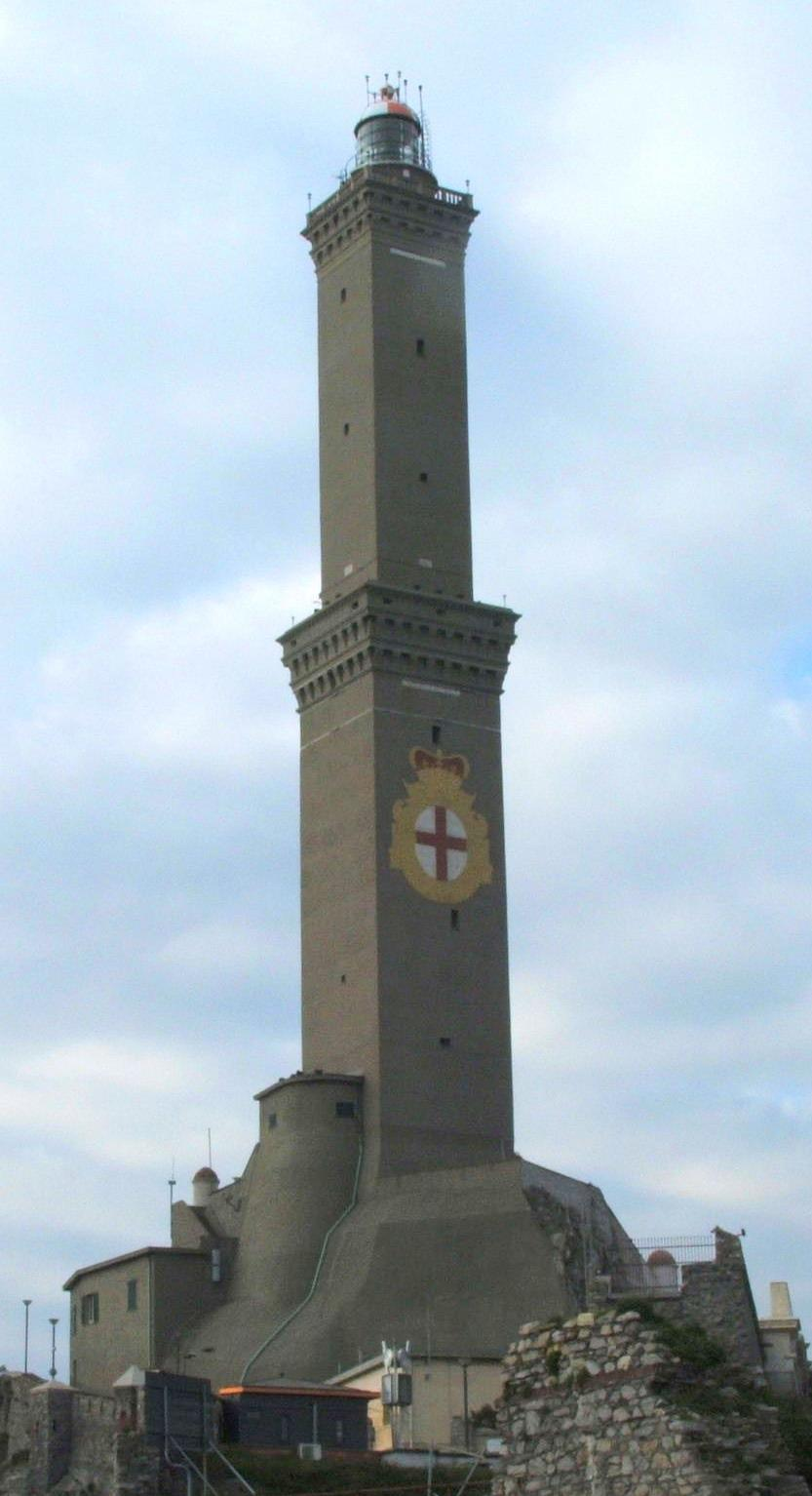
The current Lighthouse of Genoa was first lit in 1543

- 1520 - Basilica della Santissima Annunziata del Vastato construction begins.
- 1540 - Palazzo Bianco built.
- 1543 - Lighthouse of Genoa lit.
- 1576 - Rolli di Genova created.
- 1583
  - Strada Maggiore laid out.
  - Santa Maria Assunta, Genoa consecrated.
- 1585 - San Pietro in Banchi, Genoa built.
- 1619 - San Siro restored.
- 1624 - Basilica di Nostra Signora Assunta, Genoa built.
- 1625 - Relief of Genoa.
- 1632 - Fortifications expanded (approximate date).
- 1639 - Michele Castelli publishes the Genova (newspaper 1639–1646), the oldest newspaper of Italy
- 1642 - Alessandro Botticelli publishes the Genova (newspaper 1642–1684), later known as Il Sincero
- 1655 - Palazzo Stefano Balbi built.
- 1677 - Palazzo Rosso built.
- 1684 - Bombardment of Genoa.
- 1706 - The church of the Nostra Signora della Consolazione e San Vincenzo martire built.
- 1733 - San Torpete rebuilt.
- 1747 - Siege of Genoa.
- 1770 - Santissimo Nome di Maria e degli Angeli Custodi built.
- 1775 - Biblioteca Civica Berio (library) established.
- 1777 - The newspaper Avvisi started to be printed.
- 1794 - Giardino botanico Clelia Durazzo Grimaldi established.
- 1797 - Genoa becomes part of Ligurian Republic.

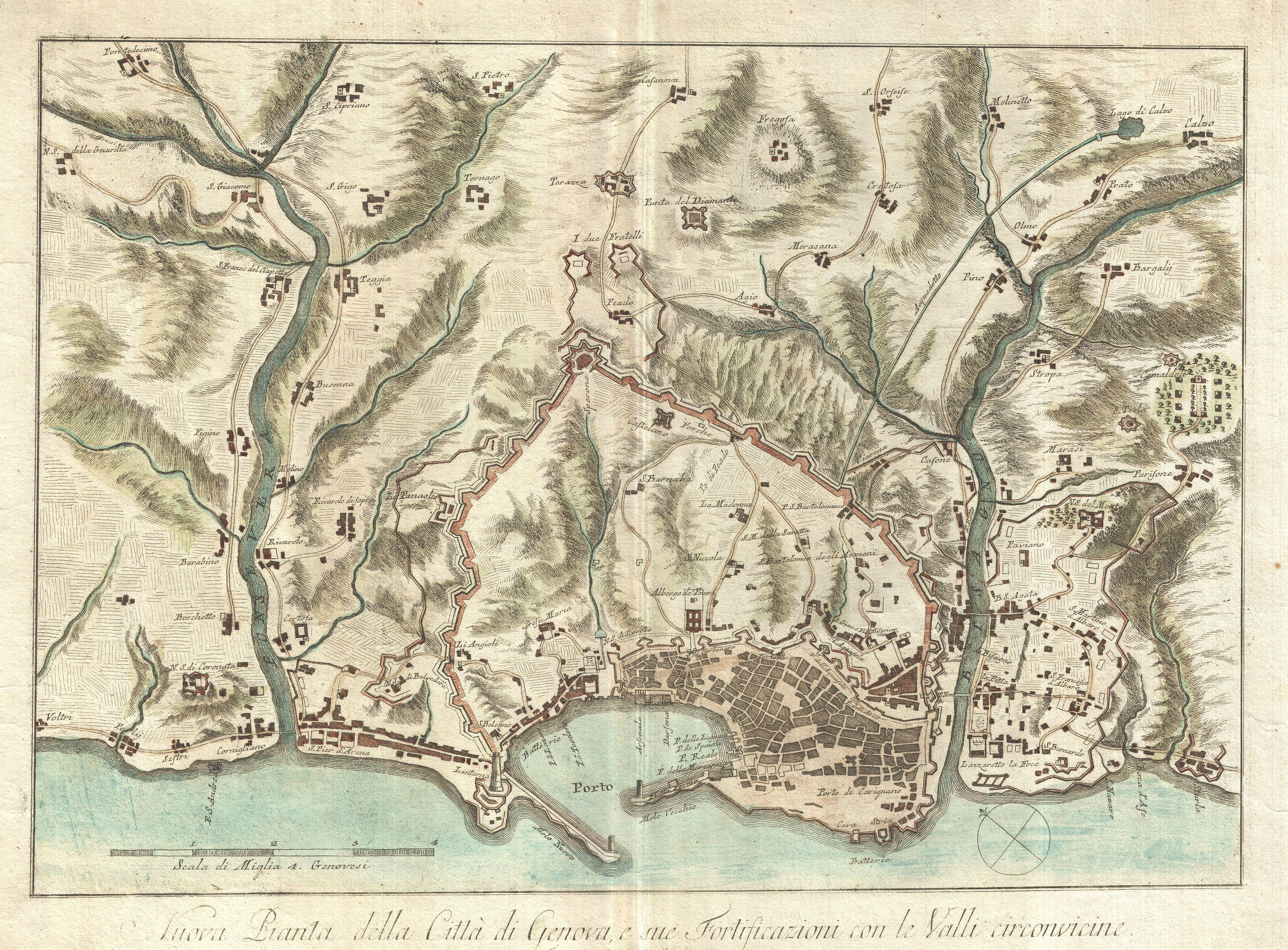
Map of Genoa, ca.1800

- 1800
  - April - Siege of Genoa.
  - April - Battle of Sassello.

== 19th century ==
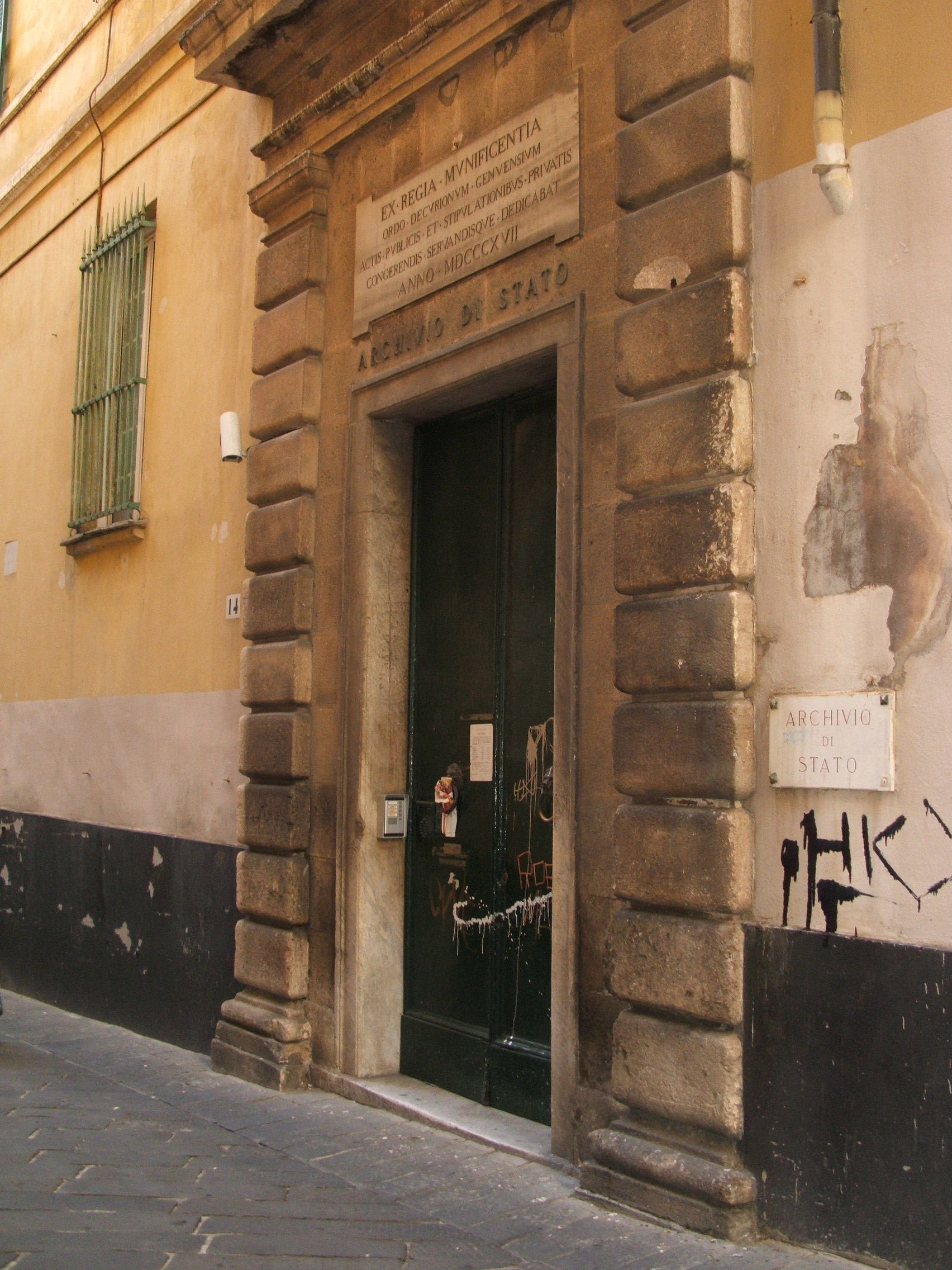
Genoa State Archives, established 1817

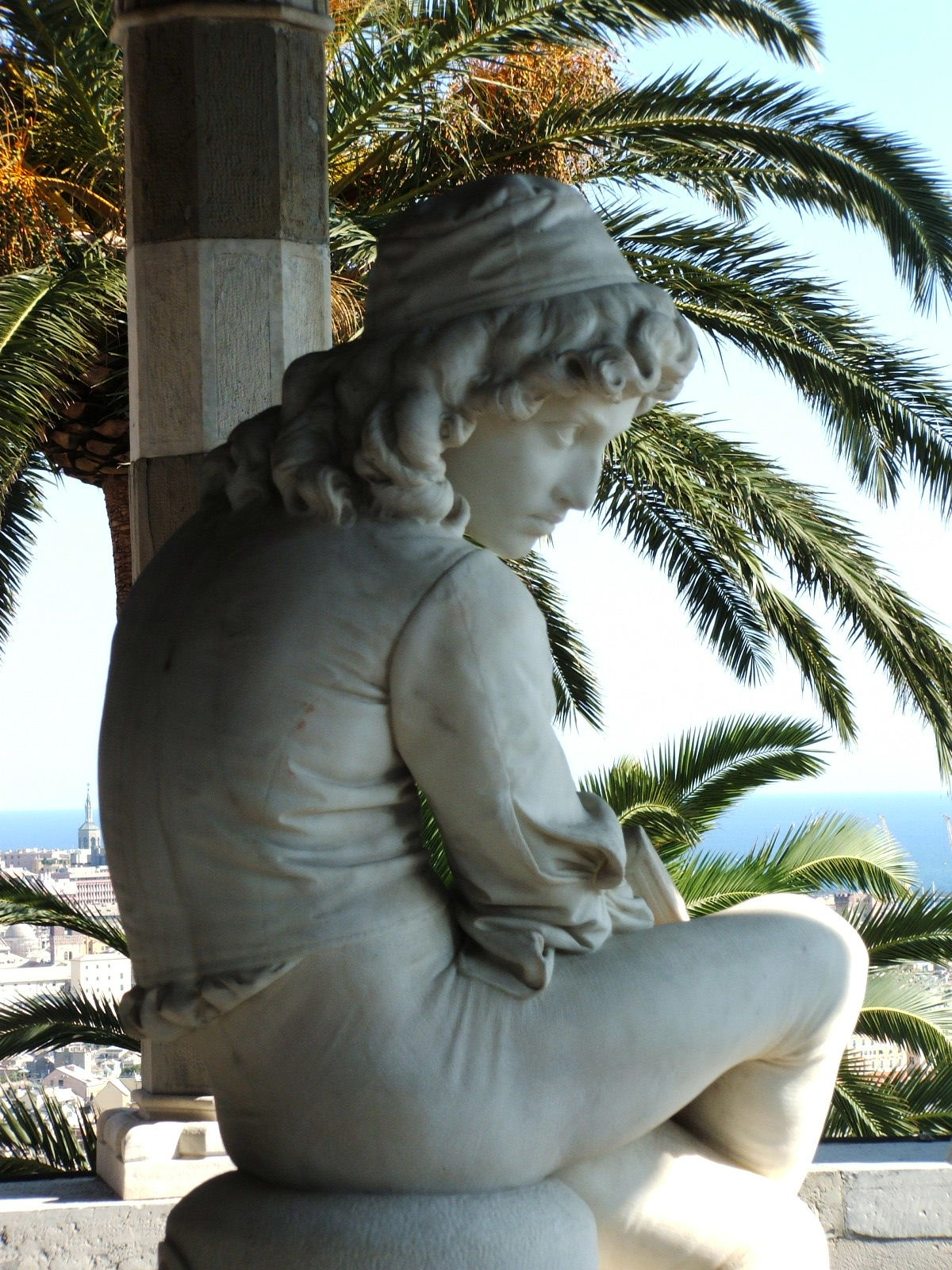
Statue of Columbus at the Albertis Castle, built in 1892 to mark the 400th anniversary of his first voyage

- 1803 - Orto Botanico dell'Università di Genova established.
- 1814 - Revolt against France.
- 1815
  - Republic of Genoa ends.
  - Genoa incorporated into Piedmont (Kingdom of Sardinia)
- 1817 - State Archives of Genoa (state archives) established.
- 1824 - Corriere Mercantile newspaper begins publication.
- 1828 - Teatro Carlo Felice opens.
- 1837 - Acquasola park laid out.
- 1846 - Villa Durazzo-Pallavicini park constructed.
- 1849
  - Revolt of Genoa.
  - Santi Quirico e Giulitta renovation begins.
- 1851 - Monumental Cemetery of Staglieno established.
- 1853 - Genova Sampierdarena railway station built.
- 1857 - Società Ligure di Storia Patria (history society) founded.
- 1860 - Genova Piazza Principe railway station opens.
- 1867 - Museo Civico di Storia Naturale di Genova opens.
- 1868 - Genoa–Ventimiglia railway begins operating.
- 1870 - Banca di Genova established.
- 1871 - Population: 130,269.
- 1876 - Via di Circonvallazione a Monte laid out.
- 1879 - Yacht Club Italiano founded.
- 1887 - Via XX Settembre laid out.
- 1890 - Stazione marittima di Genova built.
- 1892
  - Albertis Castle built.
  - Congresso geografico italiano holds its first conference in Genoa.
- 1893
  - Genoa Cricket and Football Club founded.
  - Garibaldi statue in Piazza De Ferrari unveiled.
- 1895 - Via di Circonvallazione a Mare laid out.
- 1897 - Population: 228,862.

== 20th century ==
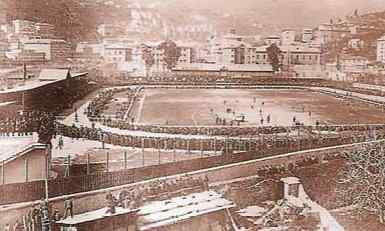
The Stadio Luigi Ferraris opened in 1911 and was a venue for the 1990 FIFA World Cup

- 1905
  - Genova Brignole railway station opens.
  - Edoardo Chiossone Museum of Oriental Art opens.
- 1911 - Stadio Luigi Ferraris opens as the Marassi.
- 1912 - Stock exchange built.
- 1914 - International exhibition of marine and maritime hygiene is held.
- 1915 - Corso Italia constructed.
- 1922
  - City hosts Genoa Conference.
  - Palazzo Reale opens as a public museum.
- 1936 - Museo di Archeologia Ligure founded.
- 1938 - First trolleybus system opens.
- 1940 - Terrazza Martini Tower built.
- 1946 - U.C. Sampdoria football club formed.
- 1962
  - Airport opens.
  - Genoa International Boat Show begins.
- 1966 Euroflora begins.
- 1970 - 7 October: Genoa flood of 1970.
- 1973 - First trolleybus system closes.
- 1975 - Teatro della Tosse, theatre company, founded.
- 1990
  - Genoa Metro begins operating.
  - City hosts 1990 FIFA World Cup games.
- 1992
  - Aquarium opens.
  - Genoa Expo '92 held.
  - 27 September: Genoa flood of 1992
- 1993 - 23 September: Genoa flood of 1993
- 1997 - Second trolleybus system opens.
- 1999 - Deledda International School established.

== 21st century ==
- 2001 - City hosts 27th G8 summit.
- 2004
  - City designated a European Capital of Culture.
  - Galata Museo del Mare opens.
- 2010 - 4 October: Genoa Sestri Ponente flood of 2010
- 2011 - 4 November: Genoa flood of 2011
- 2012 - Marco Doria elected mayor.
- 2014 - 9-10 October: Genoa flood of 2014
- 2017 - Marco Bucci elected mayor.
- 2018
  - Euroflora, Nervi
  - Ponte Morandi bridge collapses. Marco Bucci appointed commissioner for the reconstruction of the new bridge.
- 2020 - COVID-19 pandemic - Viadotto Genova-San Giorgio rebuilt during the COVID-19 pandemic to replace the Ponte Morandi. It projected by Renzo Piano.
- 2021 - COVID-19 vaccination
- 2022
  - Euroflora, Nervi
  - Marco Bucci re-elected mayor.
  - During the first day of inauguration of the 62nd Genoa International Boat Show, on 22 September 2022, an earthquake of magnitude Mw 4.0 earthquake occurred in region: 2 km W Bargagli (Genoa), on 22-09-2022 13:39:59 (UTC) - 22-09-2022 15:39:59 (UTC +02:00) Italian time and geographic coordinates (lat, lon) 44.4390, 9.0680 at 10 km depth.
  - On 4 October 2022, an earthquake of magnitude ML 3.5 earthquake occurred in region: 2 km SW Bargagli (Genoa), on 04-10-2022 21:41:09 (UTC) - 04-10-2022 23:41:09 (UTC +02:00) Italian time and geographic coordinates (lat, lon) 44.4610, 9.0630 at 8 km depth.
- 2023
  - Genoa becomes the finish of The Ocean Race.
  - The 63rd Genoa International Boat Show
  - Genoa designated the Capitale Italiana del Libro 2023.
  - On 4 May 2023 work began on the new breakwater in Genoa
- 2024
  - Genoa designated the European Capital of Sport.
  - The 64th Genoa International Boat Show
- 2025
  - Euroflora, Waterfront di Levante
  - Silvia Salis elected mayor.
  - On 10 June 2025, Festa della Marina Militare italiana held. Conclusion of the Amerigo Vespucci World Tour 2023–2025.

== See also ==
- History of Genoa
- List of mayors of Genoa
- Republic of Genoa (1005–1815)
- Doge of Genoa
- Dukes of Genoa (1831-1996)

Timelines of other cities in the macroregion of Northwest Italy:^{(it)}

- Lombardy region: Timeline of Bergamo; Brescia; Cremona; Mantua; Milan; Pavia
- Piedmont region: Timeline of Novara; Turin

== Bibliography ==
=== in English ===
Published in the 19th century

- Mariana Starke (1839), "Genoa", Travels in Europe (9th ed.), Paris: A. and W. Galignani
- Henry Jones Bunnett (1844), A description, historical and topographical of Genoa, London: John Russell Smith, OL 24511982M
- Charles Dickens (1846), "Genoa and its Neighbourhood", Pictures from Italy, London: Bradbury & Evans
- William Smith, ed. (1872) [1854]. "Genua". Dictionary of Greek and Roman Geography. London: John Murray. hdl:2027/hvd.ah5cuq.
- John Ramsay McCulloch (1877), "Genoa", A Dictionary, Practical, Theoretical, and Historical, of Commerce and Commercial Navigation, Hugh G. Reid, ed., London: Longmans, Green, and Co., hdl:2027/njp.32101079877088
- J. Theodore Bent (1881), Genoa: how the Republic rose and fell, London: Paul, OL 7047054M
- Noah Brooks (1895), "Genoa", The Mediterranean Trip, C. Scribner's Sons, OCLC 1315401

Published in the 20th-21st century

- Robert Walter Carden (1908), The city of Genoa, London: Methuen, OCLC 2471515, OL 23288656M
- Ashby, Thomas (1910). "Genoa" . Encyclopædia Britannica. Vol. 11 (11th ed.). pp. 597–600.
- "Genoa", Northern Italy (14th ed.), Leipzig: Karl Baedeker, 1913 + 1870 ed.
- Trudy Ring, ed. (1996). "Genoa". Southern Europe. International Dictionary of Historic Places. Vol. 3. Fitzroy Dearborn. OCLC 31045650.
- Giuseppi Felloni (2002). "Population dynamics and economic development of Genoa, 1750-1939". In Richard Lawton and W. Robert Lee (ed.). Population and Society in Western European Port Cities, c.1650-1939. Liverpool University Press. ISBN 978-0-85323-435-7.

=== in Italian ===
- "Genova". Ligúria, Toscana settentrionale, Emília. Guida d'Italia (in Italian). Milan: Touring Club Italiano. 1916. p. 89+. hdl:2027/wu.89003452653.
- "Genova nella guerra, 1940-1945". Storia e Memoria (in Italian). 1. 1993.

=== in Ukrainian ===
- Гавриленко О. А., Сівальньов О. М., Цибулькін В. В. Генуезька спадщина на теренах України; етнодержавознавчий вимір. — Харків: Точка, 2017.— 260 с. — ISBN 978-617-669-209-6
