= Timeline of Novara =

The following is a timeline of the history of the city of Novara (anciently called Novaria) in the Piedmont region of Italy.

== Prior to 18th century ==
- 386 - Novaria "dismantled" by Magnus Maximus.
- 397 - Roman Catholic Diocese of Novara established (approximate date).
- 398 - Gaudentius of Novara becomes bishop.
- 405 - Town sacked by forces of Goth Radagaisus.
- 450 - Battistero del duomo di Novara (baptistery) built (approximate date).
- 452 - Town sacked by forces of Hun Attila.
- 569 - Lombards in power.
- 774 - Franks in power.
- 830 - Adalgisio of Novara becomes bishop.
- 1096 - Birth of Peter Lombard, later a scholastic theologian & Bishop of Paris.
- 1110 - Novara sacked by forces of Henry V.
- 1123 - Litifredo becomes bishop.
- 1132 - Cathedral consecrated.
- 1168 - Novara joins the Lombard League.
- 1178 - Communal palace built.
- 1185 - Office of podestà established.
- 1277 - Legal code established.
- 1332 - Novara becomes part of "Milanese territory."
- 1346 - Courthouse built.
- 1448 - Sforza in power.
- 1513 - 6 June: Battle of Novara (1513) fought during the War of the League of Cambrai.
- 1538 - Farnese in power.
- 1577 - Basilica of San Gaudenzio rebuilding begins.
- 1607 - San Marco church built.^{(it)}
- 1664 - Palazzo Cabrino built.

== 18th and 19th centuries ==
- 1706 - Novara "occupied by the Savoy troops."
- 1734 - Novara "occupied by Charles Emmanuel."
- 1798 - Novara occupied by French forces.
- 1814 - Novara "restored to Savoy."
- 1821 - Austrian-Piedmontese conflict occurs at Novara.
- 1838 - Population: 18,524.
- 1842 - Market built.
- 1847 - Public library founded.

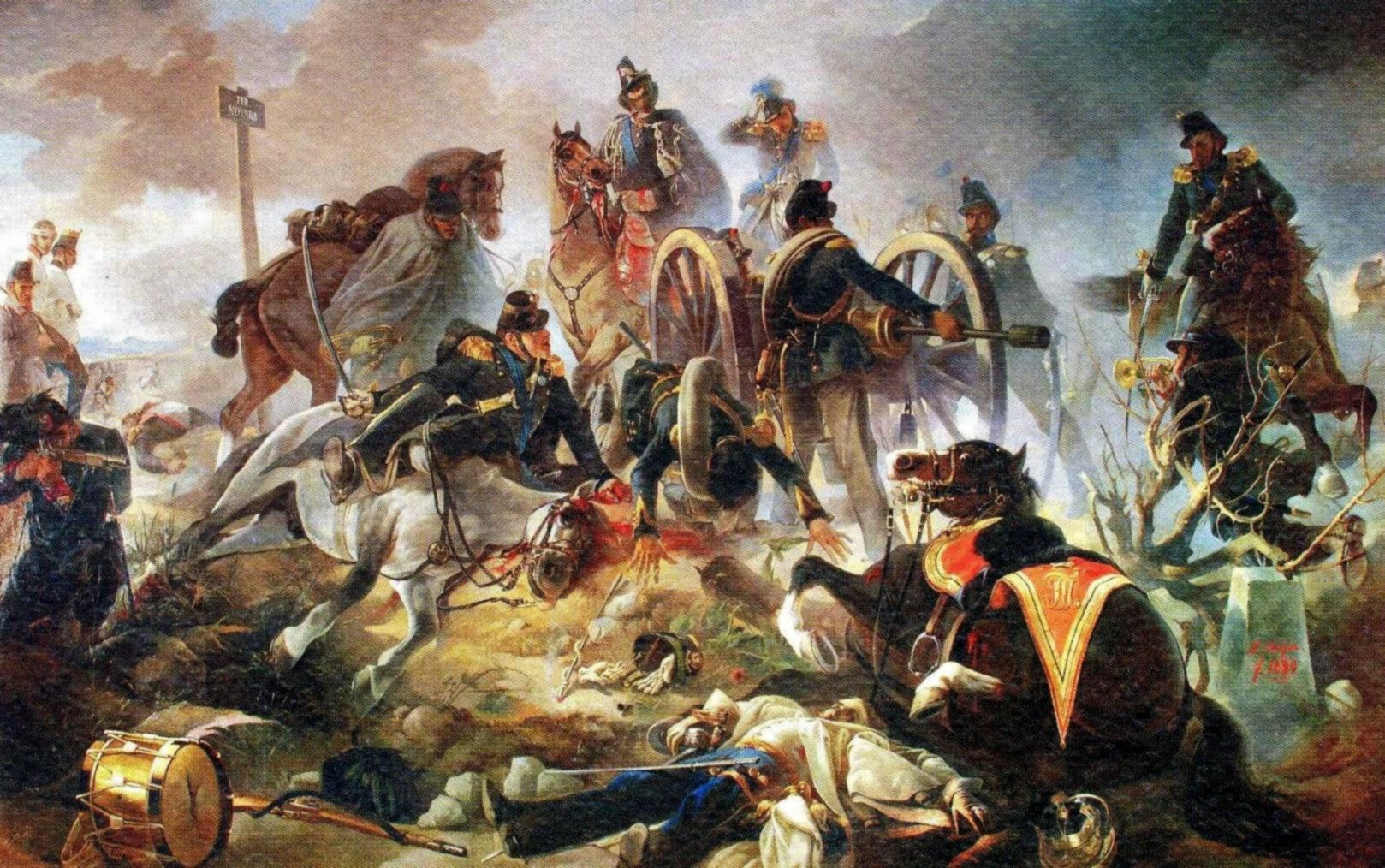
Battle of Novara (1849), 19th-century painting by Luigi Norfini

- 1849 - Battle of Novara (1849) fought during the First Italian War of Independence.
- 1854 - Novara–Alessandria railway begins operating; Novara railway station opens.
- 1855 - Arona–Novara railway begins operating.
- 1856 - Turin–Novara railway begins operating.
- 1859 - Circondario di Novara (provincial district) established.
- 1861 - Population: 25,144.^{(it)}
- 1864 - Gozzano-Novara railway begins operating
- 1869 - Novara Cathedral rebuilt.
- 1871 - Banca Popolare di Novara (bank) in business.
- 1881 - Tranvia Novara-Vigevano-Ottobiano (tram) begins operating.
- 1884
  - Corriere di Novara newspaper begins publication.
  - Tranvia Novara-Biandrate (tram) begins operating.
- 1886 - Novara–Varallo railway begins operating.
- 1888 - Teatro Coccia (theatre) opens.
- 1897 - Population: 45,189.

== 20th century ==
- 1911 - Population: 54,571.
- 1912 - Novara Calcio (football club) formed.
- 1920 - Società Storica Novarese (history society) formed.
- 1939 - Biella–Novara railway begins operating.
- 1943 - September: Stalag 365 German prisoner-of-war camp relocated from Włodzimierz in German-occupied Poland to Novara.
- 1944 - 14 March: Stalag 365 dissolved.
- 1951 - Population: 69,395.^{(it)}
- 1952 - Istituto tecnico agrario statale Giuseppe Bonfantini founded.
- 1959 - Faraggiana Ferrandi Natural History Museum established.
- 1961 - Population: 87,704.^{(it)}
- 1970 - Archivio di Stato di Novara (state archives) established.
- 1975 - Radio Azzurra (Novara) begins broadcasting.
- 1976 - Stadio Silvio Piola (stadium) opens.
- 1989 - Centro novarese di studi letterari founded.
- 1996 - Conservatorio Guido Cantelli established.

== 21st century ==
- 2004 - Novara Jazz Festival begins.
- 2013 - Population: 101,933.
- 2016 - Local election held; Alessandro Canelli becomes mayor.
- 2021 - Novara ramming

== See also ==
- Novara history
- List of mayors of Novara
- List of bishops of Novara

Timelines of other cities in the macroregion of Northwest Italy:^{(it)}

- Liguria region: Timeline of Genoa
- Lombardy region: Timeline of Bergamo; Brescia; Cremona; Mantua; Milan; Pavia
- Piedmont region: Timeline of Turin

== Sources ==
=== in English ===
- William Smith, ed. (1872) [1854]. "Novaria". Dictionary of Greek and Roman Geography. London: John Murray. hdl:2027/hvd.ah5cur.
- Ashby, Thomas (1910). "Novara" . Encyclopædia Britannica. Vol. 19 (11th ed.). pp. 829–830.
- "Novara", Northern Italy (14th ed.), Leipzig: Karl Baedeker, 1913
- Christopher Kleinhenz, ed. (2004). "Novara". Medieval Italy: an Encyclopedia. Routledge. ISBN 0415939291.

=== in Italian ===
- Francesco A. Bianchini (1828). Le cose rimarchevoli della città di Novara. Girolamo Miglio.
- Carlo Morbio (1841). Storia della città e diocesi di Novara. Storie dei municipi italiani (in Italian). Milan: Manini. OCLC 758844008.
- Giuseppe Lenta, ed. (1856), "Guida di Novara e suoi uniti con almanacco Novarese", Guida di Novara coi suoi sobborghi ed aggregati per l'anno. (in Italian), Novara, hdl:2027/uiuo.ark:/13960/t5bc57217
  - 1912 ed.
- Giuseppe Garone (1865). I reggitori di Novara. Francesco Merati.
- "Novara". Nuova Enciclopedia Italiana (in Italian). Vol. 15 (6th ed.). Turin: Unione Tipografico-Editrice Torinese. 1883.
- Carlo Lozzi (1887). "Storie de'Municipii: Novara". Biblioteca istorica della antica e nuova Italia (in Italian). Vol. 2. Imola. OCLC 12117233. (bibliography)
- Henry Berger, ed. (1899), "Giornali Italiani (per ordine di localita): Novara", Annuario della stampa italiana (in Italian), Milan
- "Bollettino Storico per la Provincia di Novara", Bollettino Storico per la Provincia di Novara (1947) (in Italian), ISSN 0392-1107 1907-
- "Novara". Piemonte, Lombardia, Canton Ticino. Guida d'Italia (in Italian). Milan: Touring Club Italiano. 1916. hdl:2027/uiuo.ark:/13960/t1rf92c9w.
- N. Bazzetta de Vemenia. Storia della città di Novara, 1931
- "Novara", Enciclopedia Italiana (Treccani) (in Italian), 1934
