= Timeline of Bergamo =

The following is a timeline of the history of the city of Bergamo in the Lombardy region of Italy.

== Prior to 20th century ==
- 45 BCE – Bergomum municipium established.
- 4th C. CE – Roman Catholic Diocese of Bergamo established.
- 894 CE – Bergamo besieged by forces of Arnulf of Carinthia.
- 1108 CE – Comunal consuls elected.
- 1137 – Santa Maria Maggiore church construction begins.
- 1264 – Milanese in power.
- 1336 – Rocca di Bergamo (castle) built.
- 1355 – Santa Maria Maggiore church completed.
- 1408 – Pandolfo III Malatesta in power.
- 1428 – Bergamo becomes part of the Venetian Republic.
- 1476 – Cappella Colleoni (chapel) built.
- 1513 – Artist Lorenzo Lotto moves to Bergamo.
- 1549 – Population: 20,843.
- 1561 – Venetian wall of Bergamo construction begins.
- 1764 – Biblioteca Civica Angelo Mai (library) founded.
- 1776 – Population: 28,581.
- 1780 – Accademia Carrara di Belle Arti di Bergamo (art academy) founded.
- 1791 – Teatro Nuovo (theatre) opens.
- 1797
  - French client Republic of Bergamo created.
  - Future composer Gaetano Donizetti born in Bergamo.
- 1805 – Lezioni caritatevoli di musica (now the Conservatorio Gaetano Donizetti) founded.
- 1814 – Austrians in power.
- 1840 – Palazzo Frizzoni built.
- 1857 – Bergamo railway station in operation.
- 1859 – Circondario di Bergamo (administrative area) established.
- 1860 – Giovanni Battista Camozzi Vertova becomes mayor.
- 1861 – Population: 37,343.
- 1869 – Banca Popolare di Bergamo (bank) established.
- 1871 – Natural Science Museum founded.
- 1887 – Bergamo Funicular railway Upper Town – Lower Town (funicular) begins operating.
- 1890 – Monza-Trezzo-Bergamo Tram begins operating.
- 1897
  - Monument to Donizetti, Bergamo erected in the Piazza Cavour.
  - Population: 45,929.

== 20th century ==
- 1901 – Bergamo-Trescore-Sarnico Tramway begins operating.
- 1907
  - City walls dismantled.
  - Atalanta B.C. (football club) formed.
- 1911 – Population: 55,306.
- 1912 – Bergamo-Albino Tram (1912-1953) and Funicolare di Bergamo-San Vigilio (funicular) begin operating.
- 1927 – Colognola del Piano, Grumello del Piano, and Valtesse become part of Bergamo.
- 1928
  - Stadio Atleti Azzurri d'Italia (stadium) opens.
  - Population: 81,400.
- 1968 – Institute of Foreign Languages and Literature established.
- 1983 – Bergamo Film Meeting (festival) begins.

== 21st century ==
- 2009 – Bergamo–Albino light rail begins operating.
- 2013 – Population: 115,072.
- 2014 – Giorgio Gori becomes mayor.

== See also ==
- History of Bergamo
- List of mayors of Bergamo
- List of bishops of Bergamo
- Timeline of the Republic of Venice, of which Bergamo was part 1428–1797

Timelines of other cities in the macroregion of Northwest Italy:^{(it)}

- Liguria region: Timeline of Genoa
- Lombardy region: Timeline of Brescia; Cremona; Mantua; Milan; Pavia
- Piedmont region: Timeline of Novara; Turin

== Bibliography ==
=== in English ===
- William Smith, ed. (1872) [1854]. "Bergomum". Dictionary of Greek and Roman Geography. London: John Murray. hdl:2027/hvd.ah5cuq.
- "Bergamo", Hand-book for Travellers in Northern Italy (16th ed.), London: John Murray, 1897, OCLC 2231483
- Ashby, Thomas (1910). "Bergamo" . Encyclopædia Britannica. Vol. 3 (11th ed.). p. 772.
- Edward Hutton (1912), "Bergamo", The Cities of Lombardy, New York: Macmillan Co.
- "Bergamo", Northern Italy (14th ed.), Leipzig: Karl Baedeker, 1913 (+ 1870 ed.)
- Egerton R. Williams Jr. (1914), "Bergamo (etc.)", Lombard Towns of Italy, London: Smith, Elder & Co.

=== in Italian ===
- Nicola Bernardini, ed. (1890). "Provincia di Bergamo". Guida della stampa periodica italiana (in Italian). Lecce: R. Tipografia editrice salentina dei fratelli Spacciante. hdl:2027/njp.32101074983378.
- P. Pesenti. Bergamo (Bergamo, 1910)
- "Bergamo", Enciclopedia Italiana (in Italian), 1930
- B. Belotti. Storia di Bergamo e dei bergamaschi, 1–4 (Bergamo, 1959)
- V. Zanella. Bergamo città (Bergamo, 1971)
