= Timeline of Cremona =

The following is a timeline of the history of the city of Cremona in the Lombardy region of Italy.

== Prior to 16th century ==
- 218 BCE - Cremona becomes part of the Roman Republic.
- 89 BCE - Roman citizenship granted to Cremonese.
- 69 CE - Siege of Cremona occurs during the Roman civil war (68-69).
- 450 CE - Roman Catholic Diocese of Cremona established (approximate date).
- 550 CE - Byzantines in power; town called "Cataulada."
- 603 CE - Town sacked by Lombard forces of Agilulf.
- 774 - Franks in power in region.
- 962 - Liutprand of Cremona becomes bishop.
- 1022 - Ruler Landolfo ousted.
- 1098 - Commune established.
- 1116 - Office of consul active (approximate date).
- 1167
  - Cremona joins the Lombard League.
  - Cremona Baptistery built.
- 1190 - Cremona Cathedral consecrated.
- 1250 - Parma-Cremona conflict.
- 1291 - Torrazzo of Cremona (tower) built.
- 1311 - Cremona sacked by forces of Henry VII, Holy Roman Emperor.
- 1322 - Galeazzo I Visconti in power.
- 1406 - Cabrino Fondulo in power.
- 1419 - Filippo Maria Visconti in power.
- 1473 - Printing press in operation.
- 1499 - Venetians in power.

== 16th-19th centuries ==
- 1505 - Future luthier Andrea Amati born in Cremona.
- 1512 - Maximilian Sforza in power.
- 1535 - Spaniards in power in Lombardy region.
- 1565 - Contado di Cremona (administrative region) formed.
- 1567 - Future composer Claudio Monteverdi born in Cremona.
- 1588 - Astronomical clock installed in the Torrazzo.
- 1644 - Future luthier Antonio Stradivari born in Cremona.
- 1668 - Population: 10,000.
- 1676 - Accademia dei Disuniti formed.
- 1702 - Battle of Cremona fought during the War of the Spanish Succession.
- 1707 - Austrians in power.
- 1747 - Teatro Nazari (theatre) opens.
- 1775 - Jesuit library opens.
- 1814 - Austrians in power in Lombardy region.
- 1848 - Revolution of 1848.
- 1859
  - Cremona becomes part of the Kingdom of Italy.
  - Circondario di Cremona (provincial district) established.
- 1863 - Treviglio–Cremona railway begins operating & Cremona railway station opens.
- 1866 - Pavia–Cremona railway and Brescia–Cremona railway begin operating.
- 1875 - Interessi Cremonesi newspaper begins publication.
- 1879 - Provincia newspaper begins publication.
- 1897 - Population: 37,632.

== 20th century ==
- 1901 - Population: 39,344.
- 1903 - U.S. Cremonese (football club) formed.
- 1906 - Cremona–Fidenza railway begins operating.
- 1911 - Population: 40,436.
- 1916 - Cremona tram begins operating.
- 1922 - "Fascist squads devastated the headquarters" of the Italian People's Party in Cremona.
- 1928 - Museo Civico Ala Ponzone (museum) opens in the Palazzo Affaitati.
- 1929 - Stadio Giovanni Zini (stadium) opens.
- 1933 - Piacenza–Cremona railway begins operating.
- 1940 - Cremona trolleybus begins operating.
- 1947 - La Provincia di Cremona newspaper begins publication.
- 1971 - Population: 82,904.^{(it)}
- 1994 - Biblioteca del Centro di Documentezione Ambientale (library) established.

== 21st century ==
- 2012 - UNESCO recognized the "Traditional violin craftsmanship in Cremona" as intangible cultural heritage
- 2013 - Population: 72,137.
- 2014 - Gianluca Galimberti becomes mayor.
- 2019 - The Museo del Violino commences the "Stradivarius Sound Bank" preservation project.

== See also ==
- Cremona history (it)
- List of mayors of Cremona
- List of bishops of Cremona (in Italian)
- Lombardy history (region)
- History of Lombardy (region)

Timelines of other cities in the macroregion of Northwest Italy:^{(it)}

- Liguria region: Timeline of Genoa
- Lombardy region: Timeline of Bergamo; Brescia; Mantua; Milan; Pavia
- Piedmont region: Timeline of Novara; Turin

== Bibliography ==
=== in English ===
- William Smith, ed. (1872) [1854]. "Cremona". Dictionary of Greek and Roman Geography. London: John Murray. hdl:2027/hvd.ah5cuq.
- "Cremona", Hand-book for Travellers in Northern Italy (16th ed.), London: John Murray, 1897, OCLC 2231483
- "Cremona". Chambers's Encyclopaedia. London. 1901. hdl:2027/hvd.hn52k6.
- "Cremona", Jewish Encyclopedia, vol. 4, New York, 1903, hdl:2027/mdp.49015002282284
- Ashby, Thomas (1910). "Cremona" . Encyclopædia Britannica. Vol. 7 (11th ed.). pp. 407–408.
- Edward Hutton (1912), "Cremona", The Cities of Lombardy, New York: Macmillan Co.
- "Cremona", Northern Italy (14th ed.), Leipzig: Karl Baedeker, 1913 (+ 1870 ed.)
- Egerton R. Williams Jr. (1914), "Cremona (etc.)", Lombard Towns of Italy, London: Smith, Elder & Co.
- Roy Domenico (2002). "Lombardy: Cremona". Regions of Italy: a Reference Guide to History and Culture. Greenwood. pp. 192+. ISBN 0313307334.
- Christopher Kleinhenz, ed. (2004). "Cremona". Medieval Italy: an Encyclopedia. Routledge. pp. 263+. ISBN 0415939291.
- Marco Gentile (2010). "From commune to regional state: political experiments in 14th-century Cremona". In John E. Law; Bernadette Paton (eds.). Communes and Despots in Medieval and Renaissance Italy. Ashgate. ISBN 978-0-7546-6508-3.
- Christoph Friedrich Weber (2013). "Cremona: a case study". In Frances Andrews (ed.). Churchmen and Urban Government in Late Medieval Italy, c.1200–c.1450. Cambridge University Press. ISBN 9781107044265.

=== in Italian ===
- Giuseppe Picenardi (1820). Nuova guida di Cremona. Giuseppe Feraboli.
- "Cremona". Nuova Enciclopedia Italiana (in Italian). Vol. 6 (6th ed.). Turin: Unione Tipografico-Editrice Torinese. 1878. hdl:2027/nnc1.cu08473730.
- Carlo Lozzi (1887). "Storie de'Municipii: Cremona". Biblioteca istorica della antica e nuova Italia (in Italian). Vol. 1. Imola. pp. 256+. OCLC 12117233. (bibliography)
- Nicola Bernardini, ed. (1890). "Provincia di Cremona". Guida della stampa periodica italiana (in Italian). Lecce: R. Tipografia editrice salentina dei fratelli Spacciante. hdl:2027/njp.32101074983378.
- Henry Berger, ed. (1899), "Giornali Italiani (per ordine di localita): Cremona", Annuario della stampa italiana (in Italian), Milan
- "Cremona". Piemonte, Lombardia, Canton Ticino. Guida d'Italia (in Italian). Milan: Touring Club Italiano. 1916. p. 441+. hdl:2027/uiuo.ark:/13960/t1rf92c9w.
- "Cremona", Enciclopedia Italiana (Treccani) (in Italian), 1931
