= Timeline of Turin =

The following is a timeline of the history of the city of Turin, Piedmont, Italy.

== Prior to 17th century ==
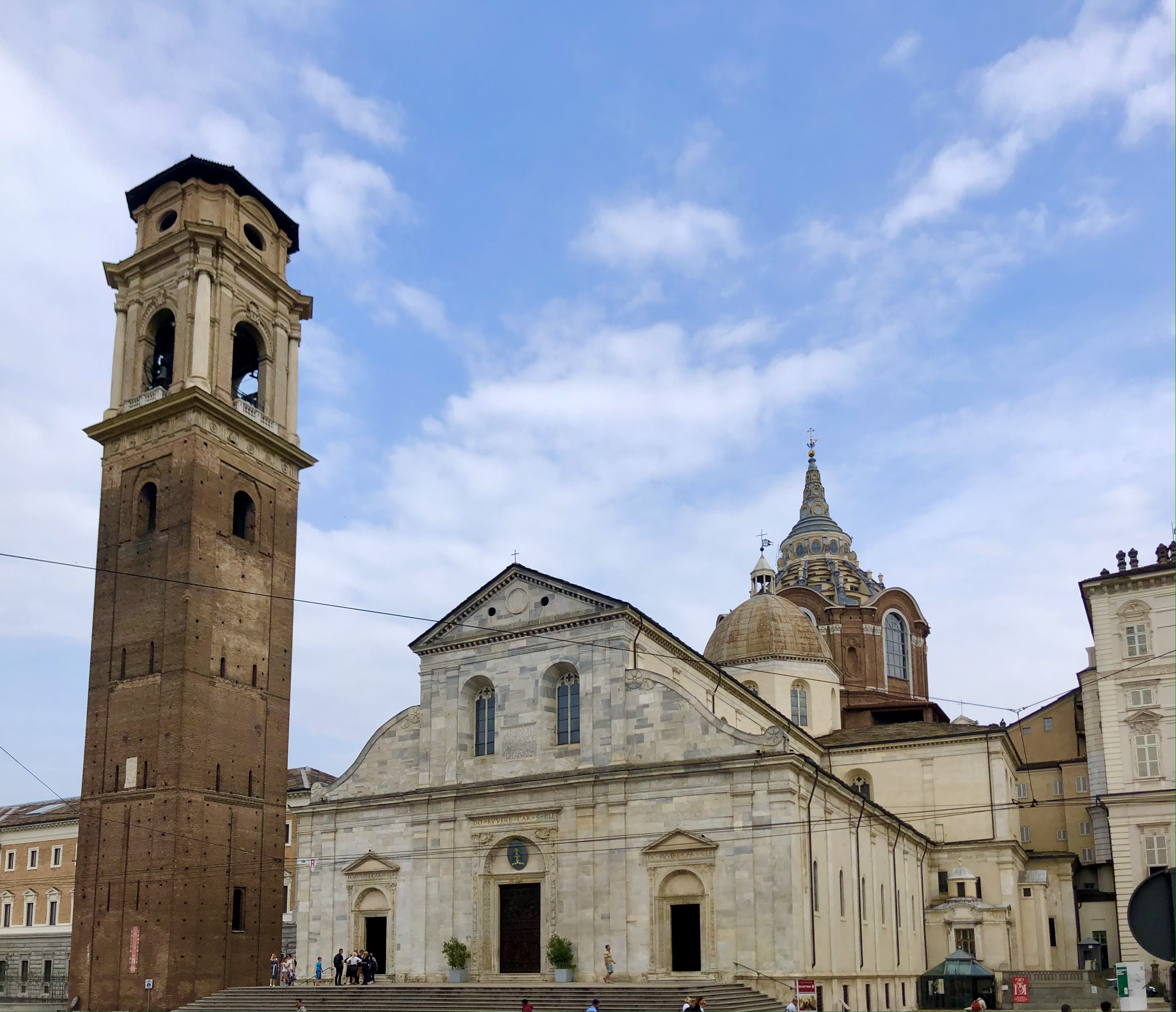
Turin Cathedral was built in 1498

- 218 BC - Town besieged by forces led by Hannibal.
- 27 BC - Romans establish Castra Taurinorum.
- 69 AD - Fire caused by negligence of the 14th legion.
- 312 - Battle of Turin.
- 5th century - Roman Catholic diocese of Turin established.
- 773 - Franks of Charlemagne in power.
- 10th century - Monastery of St. Andrew established.
- 940s - Contea di Torino (countship) founded.
- 1354 - Church of San Domenico (Turin) founded.
- 1404 - Palatine Towers rebuilt.
- 1405 - University of Turin founded.
- 1453 - City sacked.
- 1474 - Printing press in operation.
- 1498 - Turin Cathedral built.
- 1515 - Roman Catholic Archdiocese of Turin established.
- 1536 - French in power.
- 1563 - City becomes capital of the Duchy of Savoy.
- 1565 - Citadel built.
- 1568 - Collegio dei Nobili founded.
- 1583 - Capuchin monastery founded on Monte dei Cappuccini.

== 17th century ==
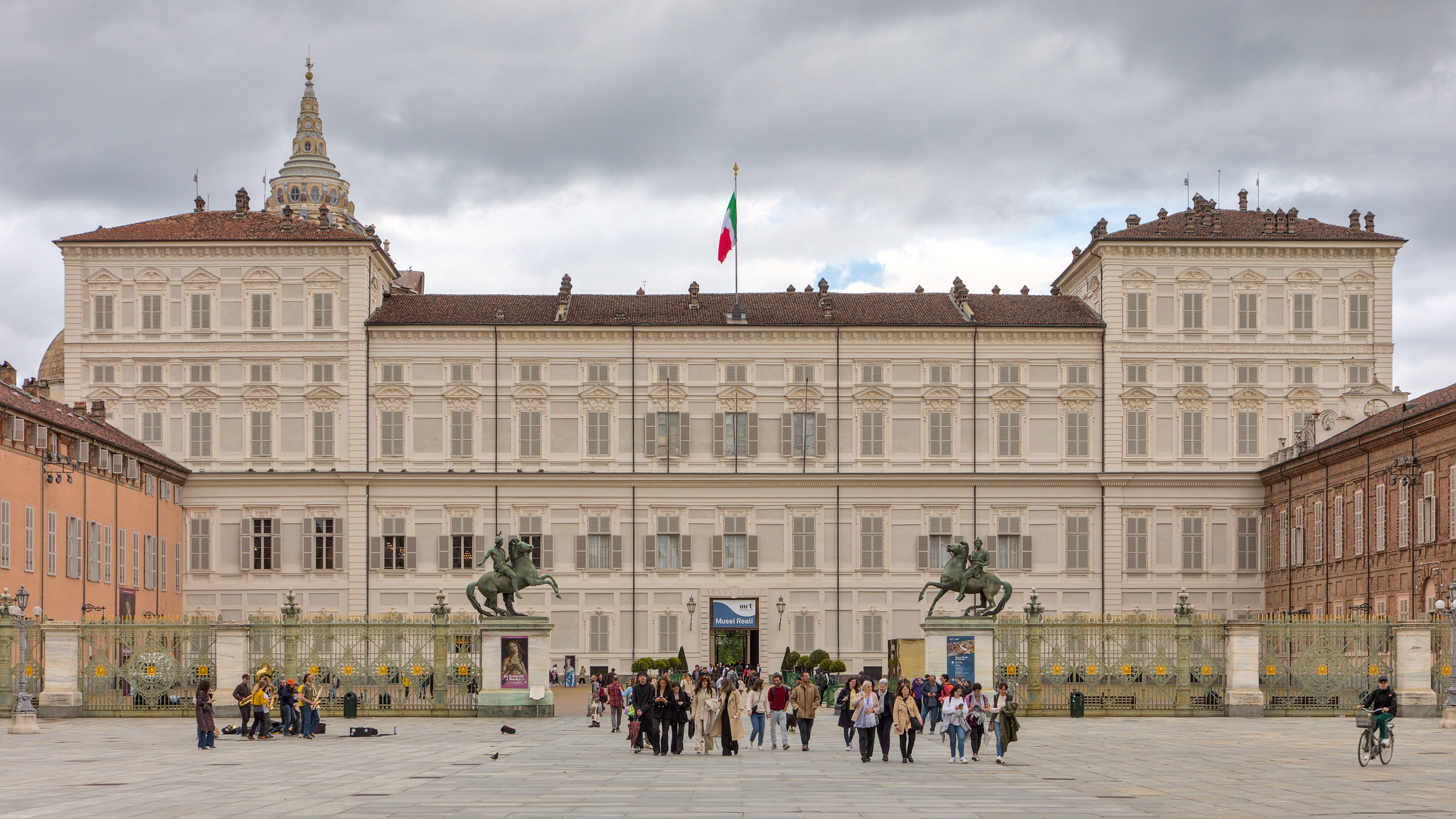
The Royal Palace of Turin was built in 1658

- 1610 - Church of Corpus Domini and Church of Santo Spirito, Turin built.
- 1630 - Plague.
- 1638 - Piazza San Carlo laid out.
- 1640 - Siege of Turin; French in power.
- 1652 - Accademia Albertina di Belle Arti founded.
- 1656 - Monte dei Cappuccini church built.
- 1658 - Royal Palace built.
- 1659 - Artillery Arsenal founded.
- 1660 - Castello del Valentino built.
- 1669 - Palazzo de Citta (town hall) built.
- 1679 - Jesuit college built.
- 1680 - Palazzo Carignano built.
- 1687 - Church of San Lorenzo built.
- 1694 - Sindone Chapel built.

== 18th century ==
- 1706 - City besieged by French forces.
- 1718 - Palazzo Madama expanded.
- 1720
  - City becomes capital of the Kingdom of Sardinia.
  - University Library founded.
- 1730 - Church of San Filippo built.
- 1731 - Orto Botanico dell'Università di Torino (garden) laid out.
- 1736 - Chiesa della Madonna del Carmine (Turin) built.
- 1740 - Royal Theatre opens.
- 1753 - Teatro Carignano opens.
- 1757 - Academy of sciences founded.
- 1760 - Reycends publisher in business (approximate date).
- 1763 - Caffè Al Bicerin in business.
- 1772 - Church of San Filippo Neri built.
- 1780 - Caffè Fiorio in business.
- 1784 - Patriottica Nobile Societa del Casino formed.
- 1785 - Società Agraria di Torino founded.
- 1798 - French in power.

== 19th century ==
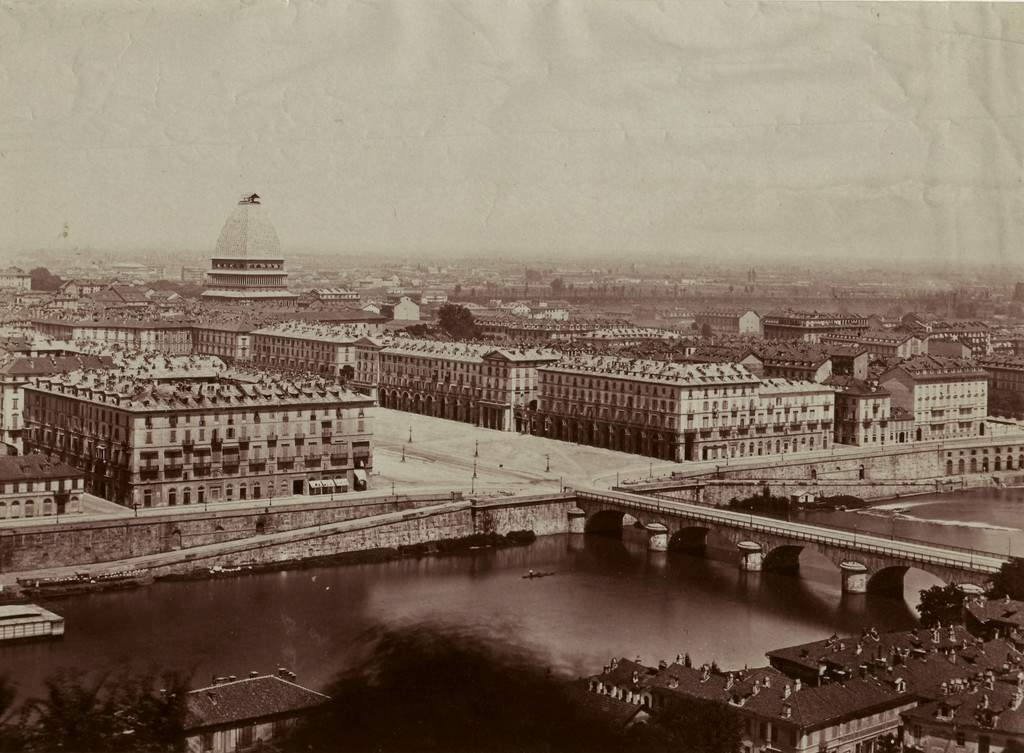
Turin in the late 19th century, with the Mole Antonelliana under construction

- 1801 - Fortifications demolished.
- 1802 - City becomes part of French Empire.
- 1814 - City becomes capital of Kingdom of Piedmont-Sardinia.
- 1815 - Accademia Filarmonica founded.
- 1823 - Population: 88,000.
- 1824 - Museo Egizio (Egyptian museum) founded.
- 1831 - Gran Madre di Dio, Turin (church) built.
- 1832 - Pinacoteca opens in Palazzo Madama.
- 1837 - Royal Library of Turin and Royal Armoury established.
- 1841 - Società del Whist founded.
- 1843 - National Historical Museum of Artillery founded.
- 1848
  - Gazzetta del Popolo begins publication.
  - Luigi de Margherita becomes mayor.
- 1857 - Fortifications demolished.
- 1861
  - City becomes capital of newly united Kingdom of Italy.
  - Population: 173,305.
- 1862 - Regio Museo Industriale Italiano (industrial museum) established.
- 1863 - Club Alpino Italiano founded.
- 1864 - Torino Porta Nuova railway station opens.
- 1865 - Capital of Kingdom of Italy relocates from Turin to Florence.
- 1867 - Gazzetta Piemontese newspaper begins publication.
- 1868 - Via Po and Torino Porta Susa railway station built.
- 1869
  - 22 February: Biblioteca Civica Centrale (Turin) (library) opens.
  - Le Nuove prison built.
- 1871
  - Fréjus Rail Tunnel opens.
  - Population: 207,770.
- 1878 - Museum of the Risorgimento established.
- 1879 - Mont Cenis Tunnel Monument erected in Piazza Statuto.
- 1889 - Mole Antonelliana built.
- 1892 - Unione escursionisti Torino (hiking club) formed.
- 1896 - 1 February: Premiere of Puccini's opera La Bohème.
- 1897
  - Sport Club Juventus formed.
  - Population: 351,855.
- 1899 - F.I.A.T. automotive manufactory in business.

== 20th century ==
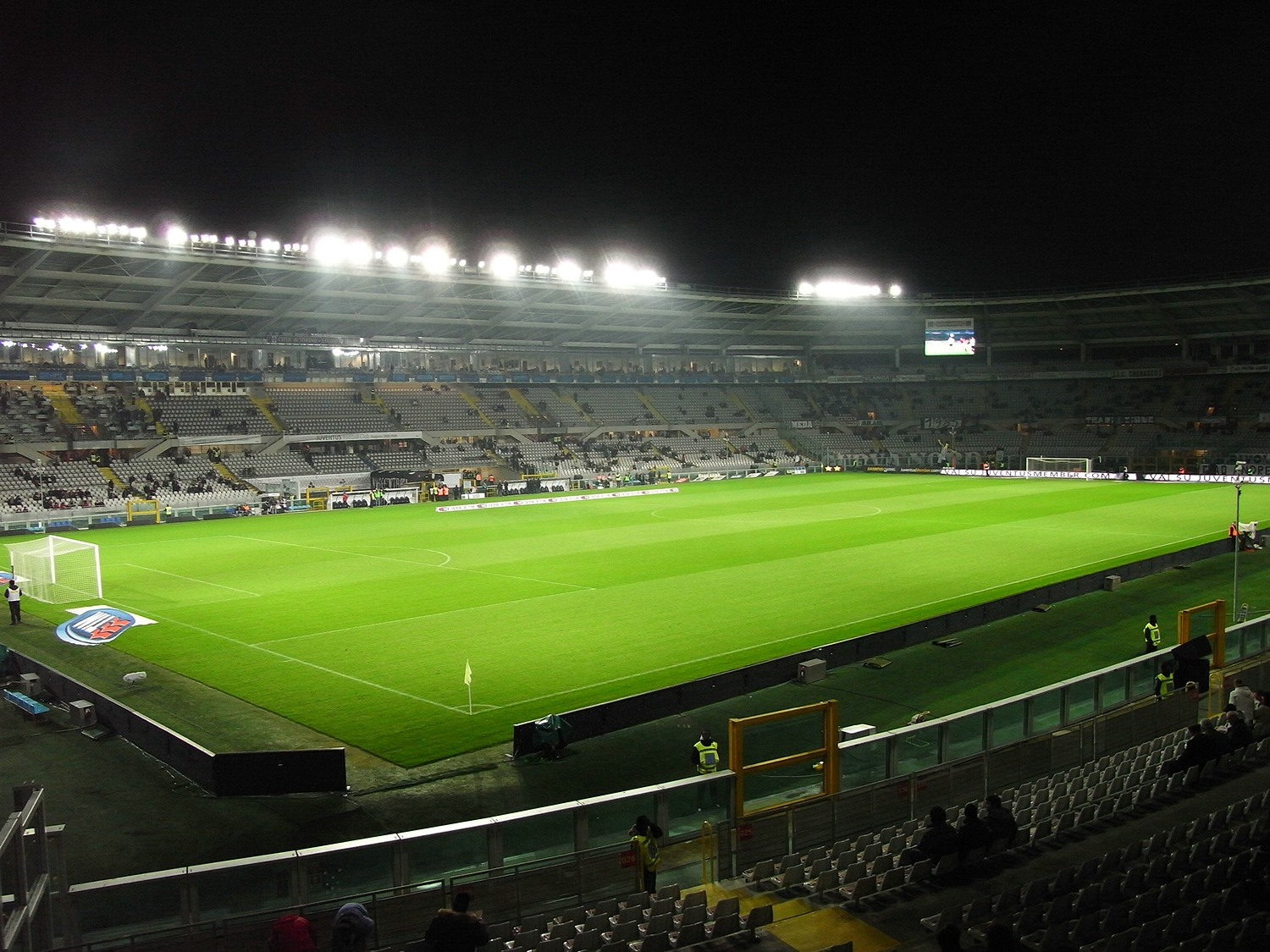
The Stadio Olimpico di Torino was a venue for the 1934 FIFA World Cup

- 1902 - International Exposition of Modern Decorative Arts held.
- 1906
  - Lancia & C. automotive manufactory in business.
  - Royal Turin Polytechnic and Torino Football Club founded.
  - Population: 361,720.
- 1907 - Derby della Mole athletic contest begins.
- 1908 - September, first solo aeroplane flight by a woman, Thérèse Peltier, from the Military Square, Turin
- 1911
  - Turin International world's fair held.
  - Population: 415,667.
- 1919 - Honorary Consulate of Poland opened (see Italy–Poland relations).
- 1922 - Conflict between Fascist and labour supporters.
- 1933
  - Giulio Einaudi editore (publisher) in business.
  - Stadio Benito Mussolini opens.
- 1934 - City Museum of Ancient Art housed in the Palazzo Madama.
- 1937 - Via Roma (Turin) constructed.
- 1940 - Honorary Consulate of Poland closed.
- 1944 - AGSSt 65 assembly center for Allied POWs established by the Germans (later relocated).
- 1945
  - Allies take city.
  - Tuttosport begins publication.
- 1949
  - May 4: Superga air disaster.
  - Torino Esposizioni built.
- 1951 - Population: 719,300.
- 1953 - Turin Airport built.
- 1958 - Politecnico di Torino building constructed.
- 1960 - Museo Nazionale dell'Automobile opens.
- 1961 - Population: 1,025,822.
- 1971 - Population: 1,167,968.
- 1982 - Festival Internazionale Cinema Giovani begins.
- 1983 - February 13: Cinema Statuto fire.
- 1988 - Salone del Libro (book fair) begins.
- 1990 - Stadio delle Alpi opens.
- 1992 - Filarmonica di Torino (orchestra) formed.

== 21st century ==
- 2001 - Sergio Chiamparino becomes mayor.
- 2002 - Lumiq Studios established.
- 2003 - Gruppo Torinese Trasporti founded.
- 2004
  - Terra Madre conference begins.
  - ESCP Europe campus established.
- 2006
  - Turin Metro begins operating.
  - 2006 Winter Olympics held.
  - Archaeological Park opens.
  - City named World Book Capital by UNESCO.
- 2007 - Eataly in business.
- 2008 - National Museum of Cinema and Museum of Oriental Art established.
- 2010 - ToBike municipal bike-sharing program begins.
- 2011
  - Juventus Stadium opens.
  - Piero Fassino becomes mayor.
- 2012 - Population: 906,089.
- 2016 - June: Turin municipal election, 2016 held.
- 2022 - Eurovision Song Contest 2022 held.

== See also ==
- List of mayors of Turin
- History of Turin
- Archivio di Stato di Torino (state archives)

Timelines of other cities in the macroregion of Northwest Italy:^{(it)}

- Liguria region: Timeline of Genoa
- Lombardy region: Timeline of Bergamo; Brescia; Cremona; Mantua; Milan; Pavia
- Piedmont region: Timeline of Novara

== Bibliography ==
=== in English ===
published in the 18th-19th century

- Frederic Leopold Stolberg (1796), "(Turin)", Travels through Germany, Switzerland, Italy, and Sicily, Translated by Thomas Holcroft, London: G.G. and J. Robinson
- "Turin". A Geographical, Historical and Political Description of the Empire of Germany, Holland, the Netherlands, Switzerland, Prussia, Italy, Sicily, Corsica and Sardinia: With a Gazetteer. London: John Stockdale. 1800. OCLC 79519893.
- Jedidiah Morse; Richard C. Morse (1823), "Turin", A New Universal Gazetteer (4th ed.), New Haven: S. Converse
- Mariana Starke (1839), "Turin", Travels in Europe (9th ed.), Paris: A. and W. Galignani
- Valery (1842). "Turin". Italy and its Comforts. London: Longman.
- Francis Coghlan (1847), "Turin", Handbook for European Tourists (2nd ed.), London: H. Hughes
- "Turin", Black's Guide to Italy, Edinburgh: Adam and Charles Black, 1869
- "Turin", Cook's Tourist's Handbook for Northern Italy, London: T. Cook & Son, 1881
- William Pembroke Fetridge (1881), "Turin", Harper's Hand-Book for Travellers in Europe and the East, New York: Harper & Brothers
- "Turin", Appleton's European Guide Book, New York: D. Appleton & Company, 1888
- "Turin", Bradshaw's Illustrated Hand-book to Italy, London: W.J. Adams & Sons, 1894
- "Turin", Hand-book for Travellers in Northern Italy (16th ed.), London: John Murray, 1897, OCLC 2231483

published in the 20th-21st century

- "Turin", Jewish Encyclopedia, vol. 12, New York, 1907
- Ashby, Thomas (1910). "Turin" . Encyclopædia Britannica. Vol. 27 (11th ed.). pp. 418–419.
- "Turin", Northern Italy (14th ed.), Leipzig: Karl Baedeker, 1913 + 1870 ed.
- Trudy Ring, ed. (1996). "Turin". Southern Europe. International Dictionary of Historic Places. Vol. 3. Fitzroy Dearborn. OCLC 31045650.
- Martha Pollak (2010). "Paradigmatic Citadels: Antwerp/Turin". Cities at War in Early Modern Europe. Cambridge University Press. ISBN 978-0-521-11344-1.

=== in other languages ===
- Modeste Paroletti (1826). Turin a la portée de l'étranger (in French). Turin: Freres Reycend.
- Davide Bertolotti (1840), Descrizione di Torino (in Italian), G. Pomba, OCLC 586330
- Luigi Cibrario (1846), Storia di Torino (in Italian), Alessandro Fontana. v.1, v.2
- Carlo Promis (1869), Storia dell'antica Torino (in Italian), Torino: Dalla Stamperia Reale
- V. Bersezio; et al. (1880). Torino (in Italian). Torino: Roux e Favale.
- Esposizione Generale Italiana in Torino 1884, Guida Ufficiale: Brevi cenni sulla citta e dintorni [Brief overview of the city and surroundings] (in Italian), Torino: Unione Tipografico-Editrice, 1884, OCLC 698384728, OL 25311191M
- "Torino". Nuova Enciclopedia Italiana (in Italian) (6th ed.). Torino: Unione Tipografico-Editrice Torinese. 1887.
- "Turin". Brockhaus' Konversations-Lexikon (in German) (14th ed.). 1908.
- Pietro Toesca (1911), Torino (in Italian), Bergamo: Istituto Italiano d'Arti Grafiche, OL 22335598M
- Teofilo Rosse; Ferdinando Gabotto (1914), Storia di Torino (in Italian), Torino: Baravalle e Falconieri. v.1
- Boccalatte et al., eds. Torino in guerra: 1940-1945 (Turin: Gribaudo, 1995)
- Bruno Maida, ed. Guerra e società nella provincia di Torino, 1940-1945 (Turin: Blu Edizioni, 2007)
