= PROMIS =

PROMIS or Promis may refer to:

- Patient-Reported Outcomes Measurement Information System, multi-institutional NIH initiative started in 2004
- Prosecutor's Management Information System (PROMIS), developed by Inslaw
- Problem-Oriented Medical Information System, developed at the University of Vermont
- Police Realtime Online Management Information System (PROMIS) a system used by the Australian Federal Police, Northern Territory Police Force, and Royal Australian Air Force Police.
- Program Resources and Outcome Management Information System (PROMIS) a system developed by Cleverex Systems for Head Start organizations.
- Promis, a wine by Italian producer Gaja from the Tuscany region.
- Promis (musician) (born 1973) is a musician and entertainer
- Carlo Promis, an Italian architect and architectural historian
