= Broletto, Brescia =

Coordinates: 45.5393°N 10.2220°E

The Broletto or Broletto Palace of Brescia has for centuries housed the civic government offices of this city found in the region of Lombardy, Italy. The term Broletto refers to a buildings equivalent to the town hall or town assembly.

Piazza Balcony and Tower of Broletto.

== History ==
Initial construction of the Broletto took place during 1187–1230, although the structure has undergone many modifications over the centuries, specially after the Sack of Brescia in 1512 during the War of the League of Cambrai.

The long stone facade on the south fronts Via Cardinale Querini, and aligns parallel the left of the Cathedral, corresponds to the ancient Palatium Novum Maius built in 1223–1227. The Tower of the Poncarali in unfinished stone is attached to the facade. Originally 30 meters tall, it was lowered to about 19 metres by Ezzelino III da Romano. The nearly 54 meter Tower of Pègol is still intact, with a small belfry hidden by the Ghibelline crenellations added at the beginning of the 19th century. The clock on the inner wall of the first courtyard came from the nearby former cathedral of San Pietro de Dom, demolished in the 16th century. The balcony overlooking Piazza Paolo VI, called the Loggia delle Grida, can be seen near the tower. It was destroyed by the French forces in 1797 and rebuilt in the 20th century.

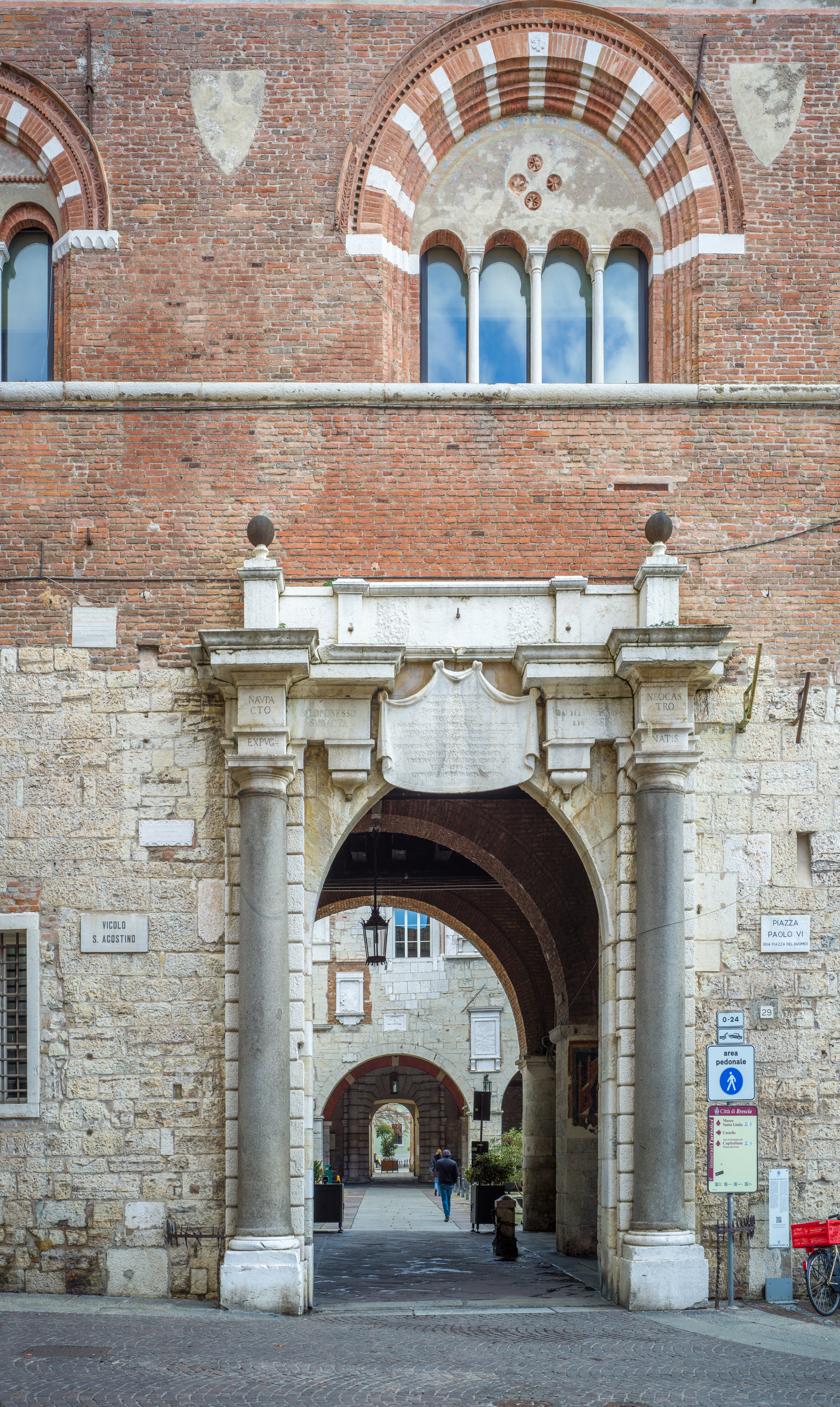
East gate or Porta Orientale; carved template above door from Venetian rule, expunged in 1790s

Entry to the Broletto is through the Porta Orientale (1606) embellished with monolithic pillars from Roman times made of Egyptian granite, which once ornamented the entrance to the demolished cathedral of San Pietro de Dom. The upper part of the doorway was designed by Antonio Tagliaferri in the late 1800s.

In the porch there is a stone tablet under the sculpture of Justice Enthroned, it was defaced by the Jacobins but used to represent the Venetian Lion of Saint Mark. The 14th century fresco of the Enthroned Madonna with Child is still visible on the right.

The oldest wings of the Palazzo Nuovo Maggiore, whose porticos are now walled up, give onto the west and south sides of the large southern courtyard, which has a fountain in the center. There are fine capitals in the style of Antelami coupling the windows on the first floor, above all, those of the quadrifora on the left, which has a round lobate window in the lunette, with twelve figures representing the months of the year. Another thing to notice is the reconstruction of the ancient wooden staircase, which in medieval times led to the great hall of the Maggior Consiglio (the organ of government) on the first floor.

The Palazzo Nuovo Minore is on the east side of the courtyard and bears this name because it was finished later (1232) than the first building on the west side. During the first 20 years of the 15th century a loggia was added by the Malatestas with four elegant slightly pointed arches and ribbed cross-vaults. Pandolfo I Malatesta also commissioned the frescos by Gentile da Fabriano, and a few fragments of these have recently been found. Unfortunately, other frescos by Lattanzio Gambara which decorated the loggia were destroyed in the bombing of the Broletto and Piazza Paolo VI on 13 July 1944. The base of the pillars, which has recently been uncovered, shows the ground level at that period was lower than it is today.

On the north side of the courtyard there is a building dating back to 1626, with a portico of undressed stone in classical style, with grotesque faces on the keystones of the arches, and a loggia.

The east doorway (1610) is perfectly aligned, along the line where the antique decumano^{?} stretched, with the west door, which opens onto Piazza Paolo VI. Entering by the east door a few steps further in, on the left, before the second doorway (1626) into the courtyard, you will find the Scalone de Lezze (1610), which leads to the registrar's offices.

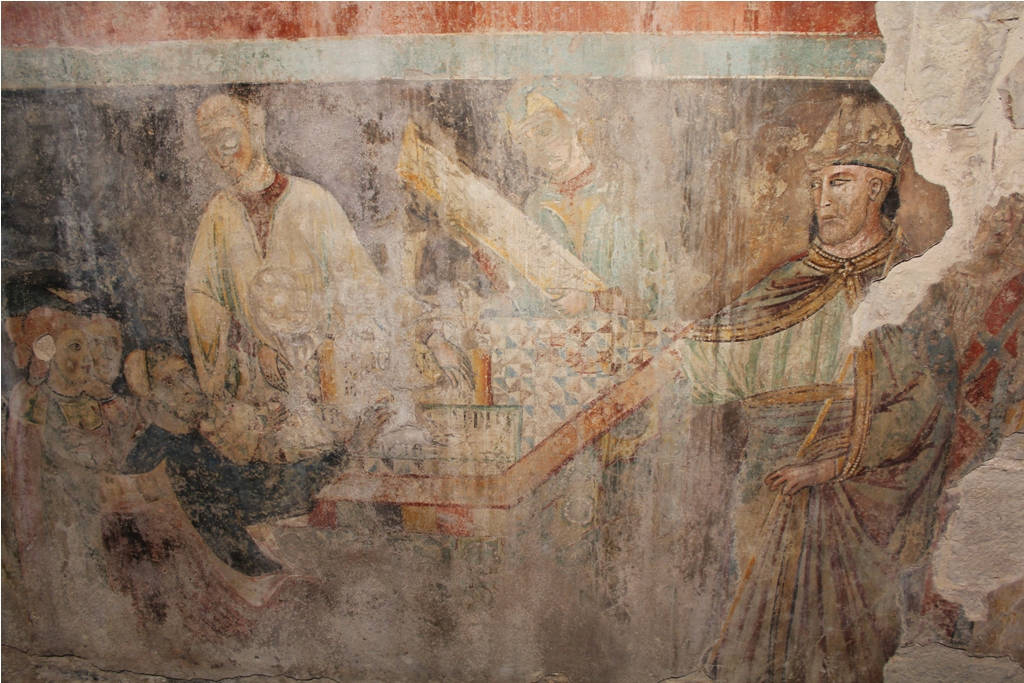
Peace of Berardo Maggi in the Salone dei Cavalieri (14th ct.)

A stairway and the corridor with ceilings decorated by Tommaso Sandrini and Francesco Giugno (1574–1651) lead into the Chamber of the Podestà, divided into four rooms in the 16th century. The 9 meter height of the original room was reduced too and each of the four later rooms has a frescoed ceiling: Power restraining Fortune and Virtue on the clouds and afflicting the world by Antonio Gandino, Plenty in the second room, also by Gandino, and in the next two rooms two frescos by Tommaso Sandrini: The Allegory of Time in the third and allegorical female figures in the fourth. In the space between the vaulted ceiling of the registry and the beamed ceiling of the antique hall of Maggior Consiglio, there are two very old frescos from the second half of the 13th century: Knights Taken Prisoner, partly obliterated on the north wall by an early 14th-century fresco of far finer workmanship, The Peace of Bishop Berardo Maggi.
