= Civic Tower (Pavia) =

Collapsed medieval bell tower in Pavia, Italy

Coordinates: 45°11′06″N 9°09′10″E

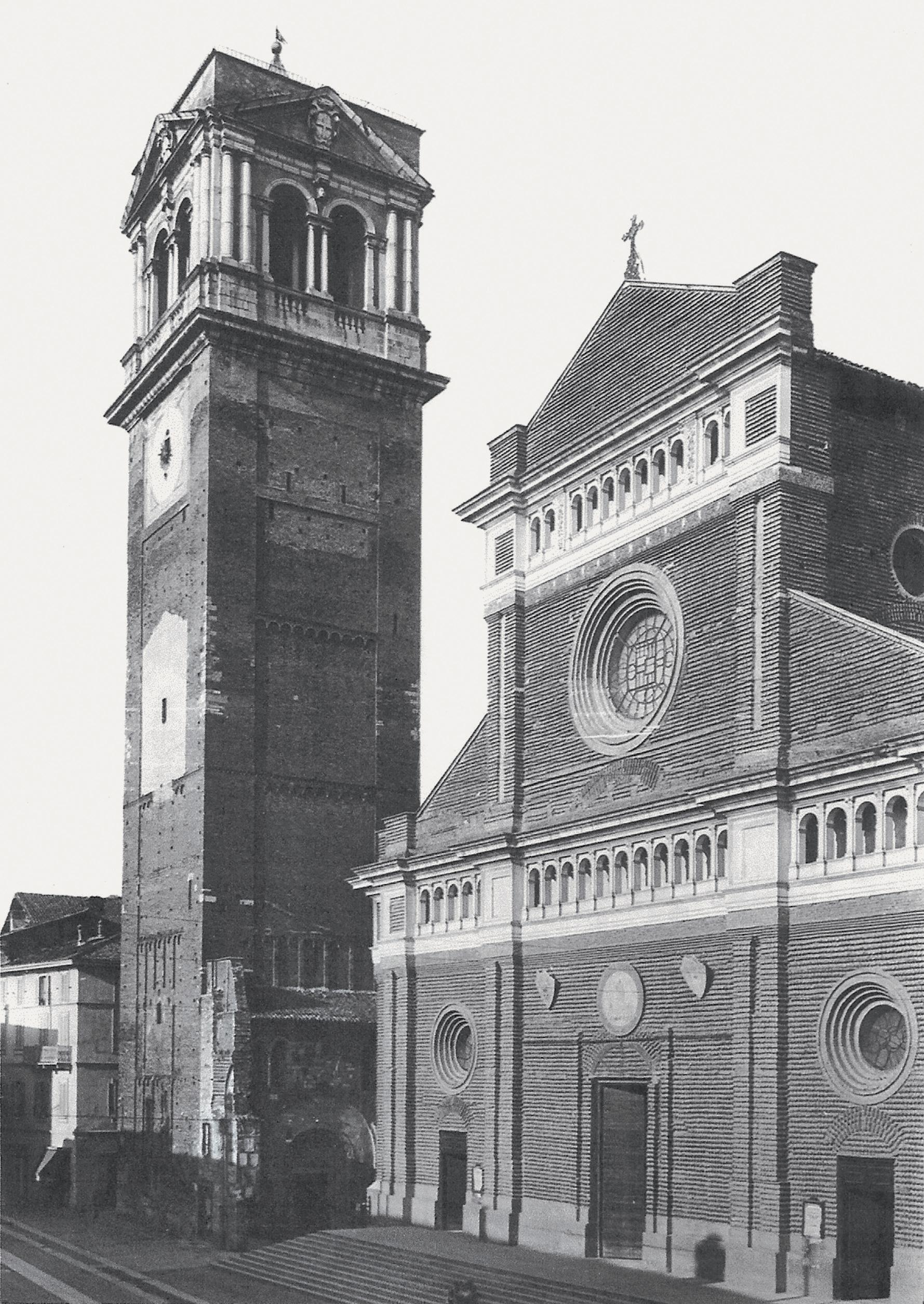
Civic Tower at Pavia cathedral (at left) before its collapse

The Civic Tower (Italian: Torre Civica) was a tower built in the Italian city of Pavia in the 11th century, next to Pavia Cathedral. Built to a rectangular base, it was 72 metres (236 feet) high. The tower collapsed in 1989 and has not been rebuilt.

== Description ==
Between 1583 and 1585, the architect Pellegrino Tibaldi led works to add a room at the top of the tower to house the cathedral's bells, which it did until it was moved to a campanile of the cathedral.

=== The collapse ===
On 17 March 1989, at 8:55 a.m., the Civic Tower collapsed, leaving 8,000 cubic metres (280,000 cubic feet) of brick, sand and granite rubble. The collapse killed four people and injured fifteen. It has not been rebuilt, though some elements from it are now on display at the city's Castello Visconteo.

After the tower's collapse, the Italian government closed the Leaning Tower of Pisa on 7 January 1990 over concerns that the popular tourist site might also be at risk of collapse.

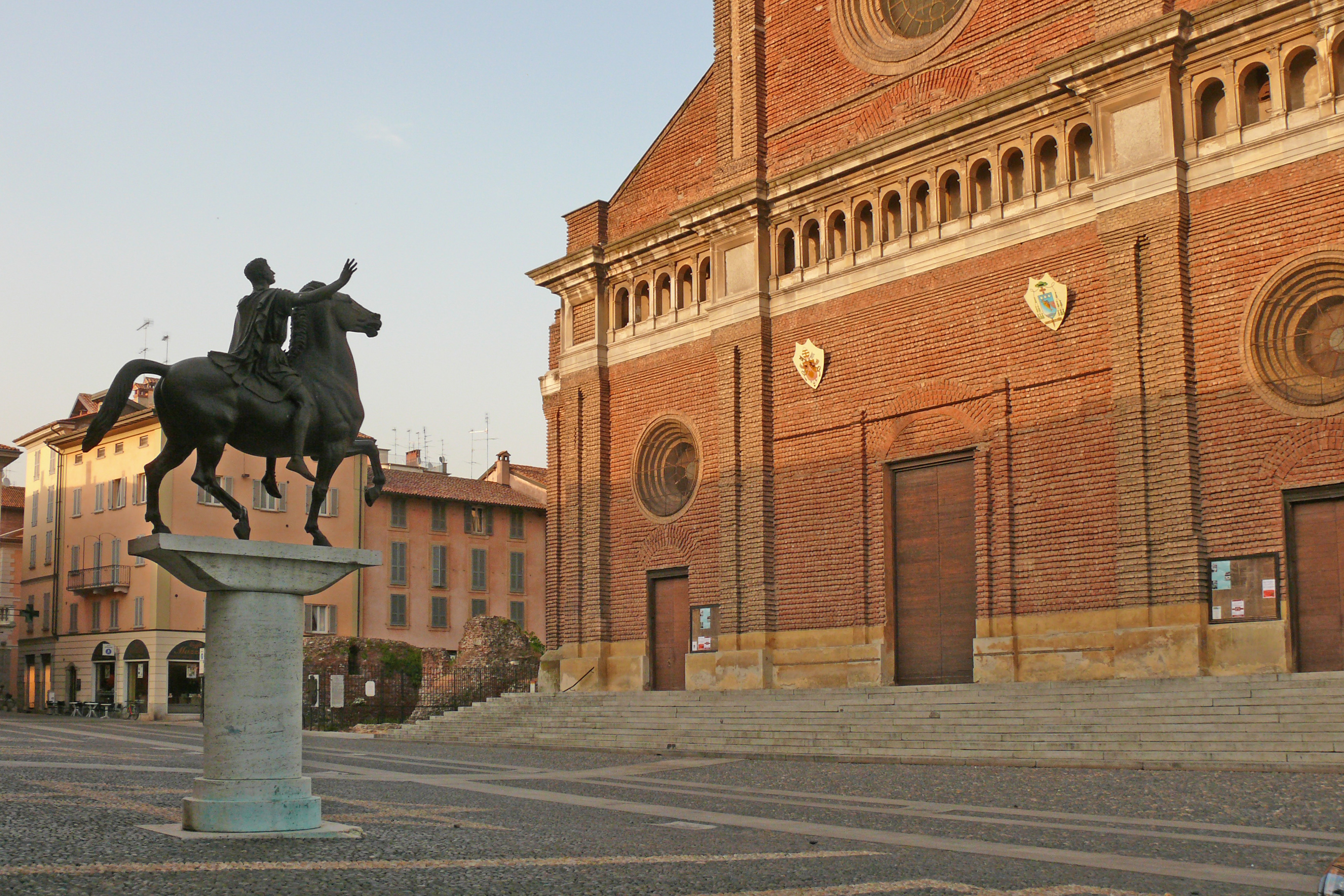
Remains of the tower (between the statue base and the corner of the Pavia Cathedral).

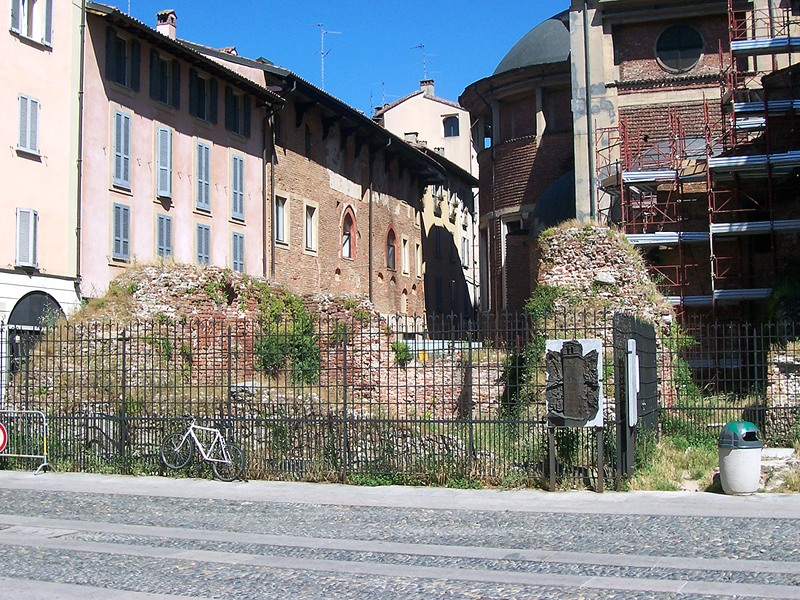
Close-up of remains with a plaque showing its original form
