= Brescia Castle =

Castle in Brescia, Italy

Coordinates: 45°32′34″N 10°13′31″E

- Brescia, Italy
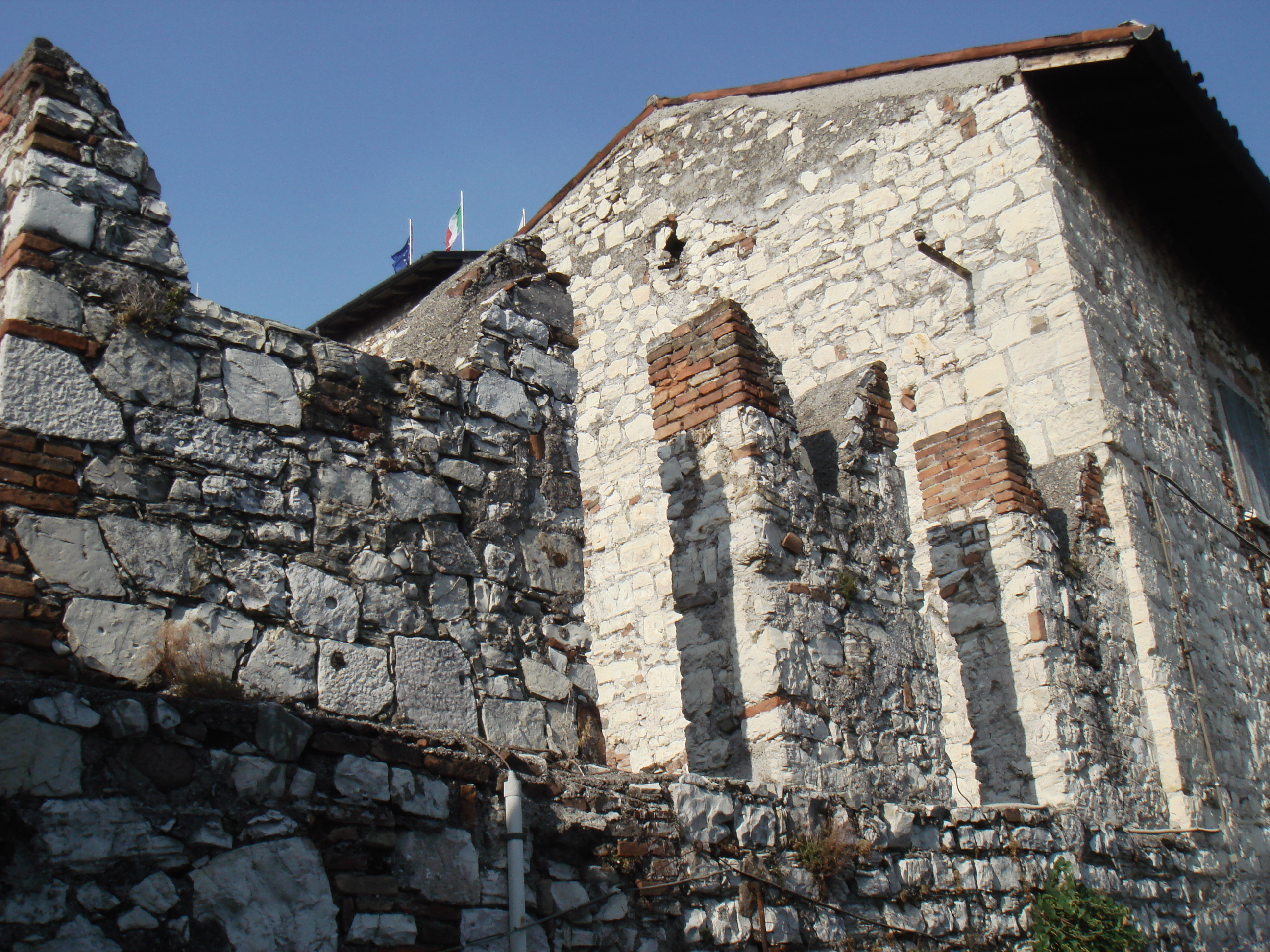
- The Castle in 2009

Brescia Castle (known as Falcone d'Italia) is a fortress built during the medieval period on the Cidneo hill in Brescia, Italy above the historic center of the city.

== History ==
A zoo was opened on the castle grounds in 1913 and closed in 1988.
