= Torre della Gabbia, Mantua =

Medieval tower in Mantua

Coordinates: 45.1594°N 10.7958°E

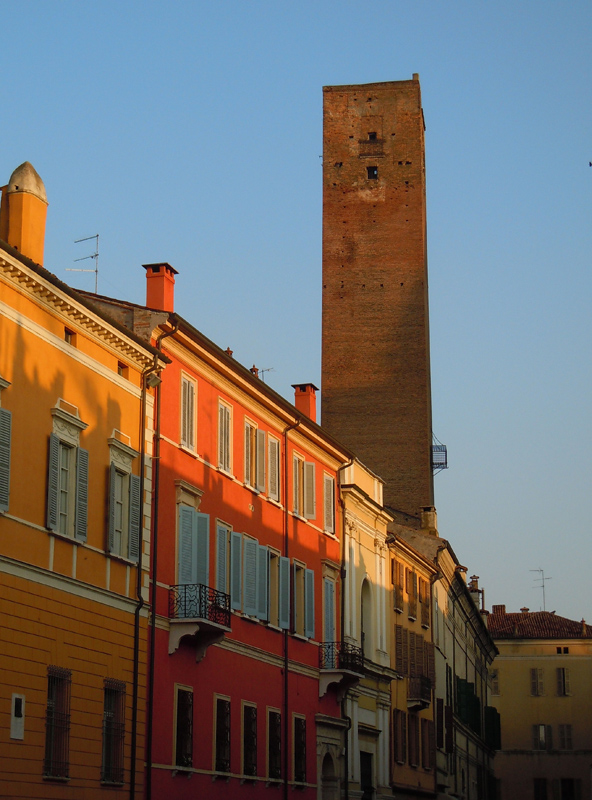
Torre della Gabbia with iron cage at mid-height

The Tower della Gabbia is a medieval tower located on Via Cavour #102 in Mantua, region of Lombardy, Italy.

== History ==
The tower was built in 1281 by the Acerbi family, however, the tower takes its present name from a rectangular metal cage, erected in 1576 under Duke Guglielmo Gonzaga. The cage measured two meters long, one meter deep and high, perched about a third of the height. The cage was used to publicly expose criminals. Some documents indicate it was used to execute some prisoners, including in 1500, a Dominican friar arrested in a house of ill-repute, after giving mass despite being illiterate, as well as other crimes including murder. In 1798, the owner was instructed to destroy the cage as a symbol of tyranny, but it was retained, apparently as a curiosity. Some sources say the tower, was built in 1302 by architect Botticella Bonacolsi.
