= Carlo Promis =

Italian architect (1808–1873)

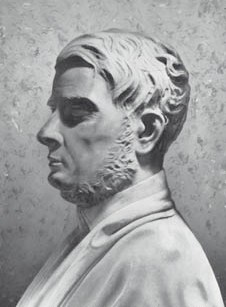
Carlo Promis

Carlo Promis (1808 – 1873 in Turin, Italy) was an Italian architect and architectural historian and a proponent of Eclecticism.

Promis earned his degree in architecture at Turin in 1828 and subsequently worked in Rome alongside leaders in the field of ancient architectural history, including Carlo Fea, Luigi Canina, and Antonio Nibby. He studied ancient sites, including Alba Fucens, and carried out new projects in Turin.
