= Dictionary of Greek and Roman Geography =

British online encyclopedia

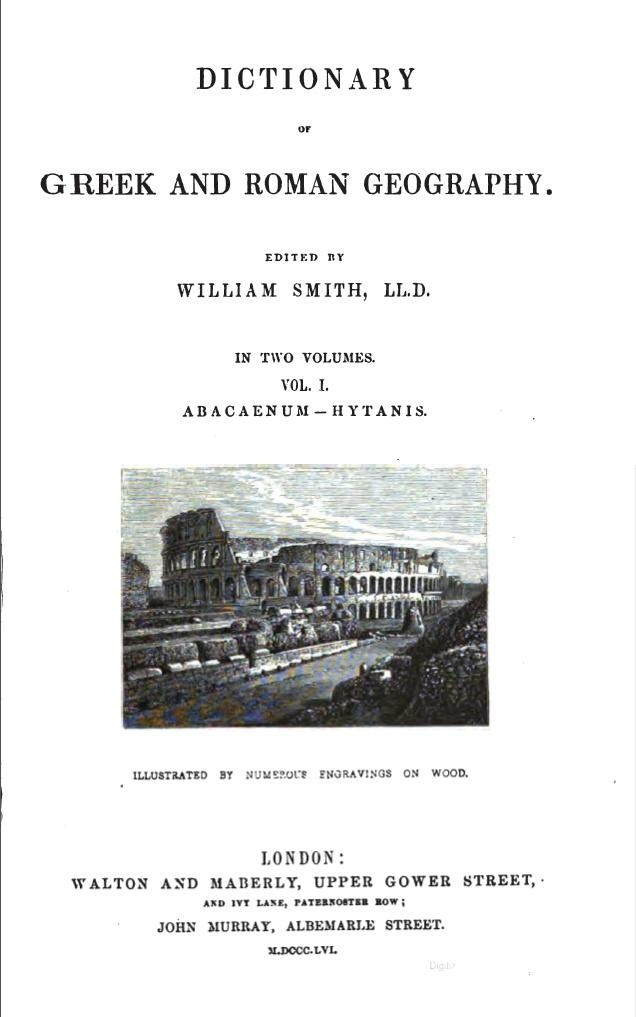
- Editor: William Smith
- Language: English
- Publication date: 1854
- ISBN: 9783375174040

The Dictionary of Greek and Roman Geography is the last in a series of classical dictionaries edited by the English scholar William Smith (1813–1893), following A Dictionary of Greek and Roman Antiquities and the Dictionary of Greek and Roman Biography and Mythology. It was first published in 1854, and last reissued in 2005.

As declared by Smith in the Preface: "The Dictionary of Geography [...] is designed mainly to illustrate the Greek and Roman writers, and to enable a diligent student to read them in the most profitable manner."

In two massive volumes, the dictionary provides detailed coverage of all the important countries, regions, towns, cities, and geographical features mentioned in Greek and Latin literature, and the Bible. It retains "Greek and Roman" partly for uniformity, but chiefly to indicate the principle object of the work.

== See also ==
- Dictionary of Greek and Roman Antiquities
- Dictionary of Greek and Roman Biography and Mythology

== Facsimiles ==
- Via Google Book Search:
  - (1854) Dictionary of Greek and Roman Geography, Vol. I: Abacaenum – Hytanis
  - (1857) Dictionary of Greek and Roman Geography, Vol. II Iabadius – Zymethus
- The Internet Archive has a number of editions including:
- Smith, William (1854). Dictionary of Greek and Roman Geography (Abacaenum – Hytanis). Vol. 1. Boston: Little, Brown.
- Smith, William (1857). Dictionary of Greek and Roman Geography, Vol. II Iabadius – Zymethus. Vol. 2. London: Walton and Mayberly.
- Smith, William (1870). Dictionary of Greek and Roman Geography (Abacaenum – Hytanis). Vol. 1. Boston: Little, Brown.
- Smith, William (1872). Dictionary of Greek and Roman Geography (Iabadius – Zymethus). Vol. 2. London: John Murray.
