= Northwest Italy =

Coordinates: 45°30′N 9°00′E

Northwest Italy Italia nord-occidentale (Italian) Nord-ovest (Italian)
- Statistical region
- Country: Italy
- Regions: List: Aosta Valley; Liguria; Lombardy; Piedmont

Area
  - Total: 57,927.83 km^{2} (22,366.06 sq mi)

Population (2026)
  - Total: 15,955,242
  - Density: 275.4331/km^{2} (713.3685/sq mi)
- Languages
  - Official language: Italian
  - Official linguistic minorities: Franco-Provençal; French; Occitan
  - Regional languages: Ligurian; Lombard; Piedmontese

Northwest Italy (Italian: Italia nord-occidentale or just Nord-ovest) is one of the five official statistical regions of Italy used by the National Institute of Statistics (ISTAT), a first level NUTS region and a European Parliament constituency. Northwest encompasses four of the country's 20 regions:

- Aosta Valley
- Liguria
- Lombardy
- Piedmont

== Geography ==
It borders to the west with France via the Western Alps, to the north with Switzerland via the Central Alps, to the east with the regions of Trentino-Alto Adige, Veneto and Emilia-Romagna belonging to Northeast Italy and to the south with the Ligurian Sea and the extreme offshoot of Tuscany in Central Italy. Northwest Italy includes a large part of the Po Valley and is crossed by the Po river, the longest in Italy.

=== Regions ===
Region	Capital	Population (2026)	Area (km^{2})	Density (inh./km^{2})
Aosta Valley	Aosta	122,554	3,260.90	37.6
Liguria	Genoa	1,511,988	5,416.21	279.2
Lombardy	Milan	10,065,694	23,863.65	421.8
Piedmont	Turin	4,255,006	25,387.07	167.6

== Demographics ==
As of 2026, the population is 15,955,242, of which 49.2% are male, and 50.8% are female. Minors make up 14.4% of the population, and seniors make up 25.5%.

Historical population

Year	Pop.	±%
1861	6,834,069	—
1871	7,425,893	+8.7%
1881	7,841,835	+5.6%
1901	8,803,296	+12.3%
1911	9,591,567	+9.0%
1921	10,046,568	+4.7%
1931	10,559,721	+5.1%
1936	10,804,917	+2.3%

Year	Pop.	±%
1951	11,745,432	+8.7%
1961	13,156,710	+12.0%
1971	14,938,428	+13.5%
1981	15,290,929	+2.4%
1991	14,950,859	−2.2%
2001	14,938,562	−0.1%
2011	15,765,567	+5.5%
2021	15,831,941	+0.4%

Source: ISTAT

=== Largest cities ===
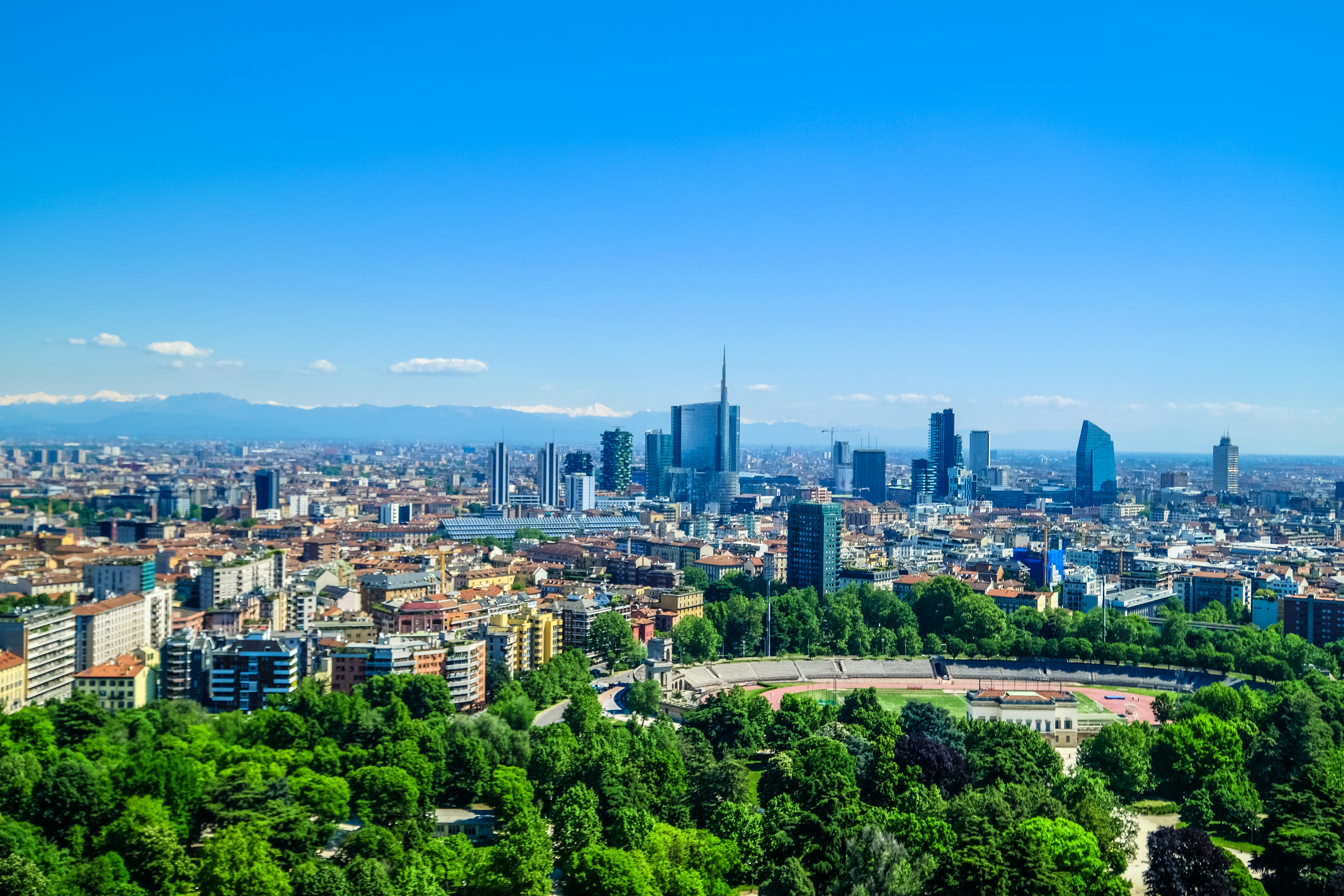
Milan

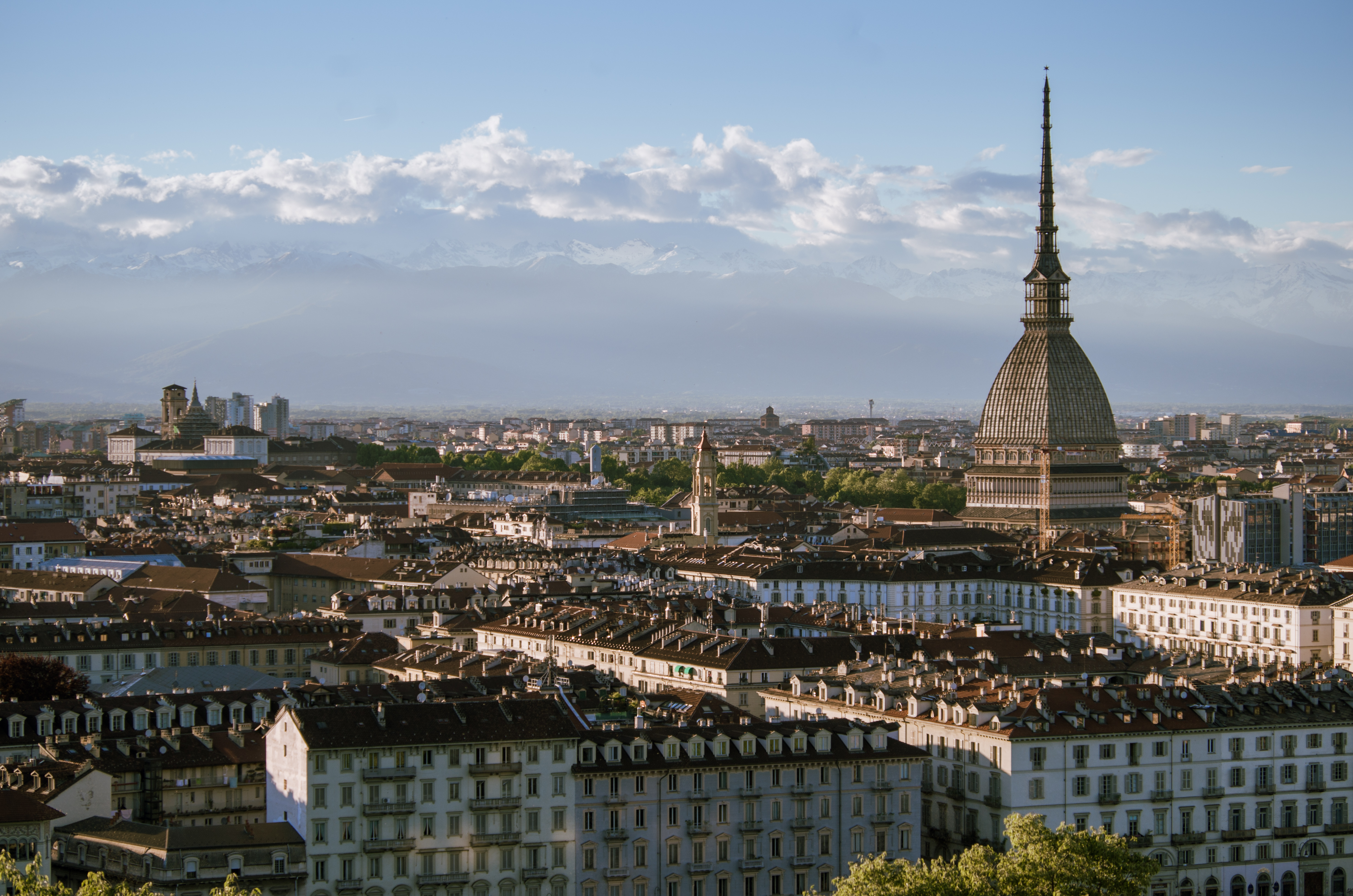
Turin

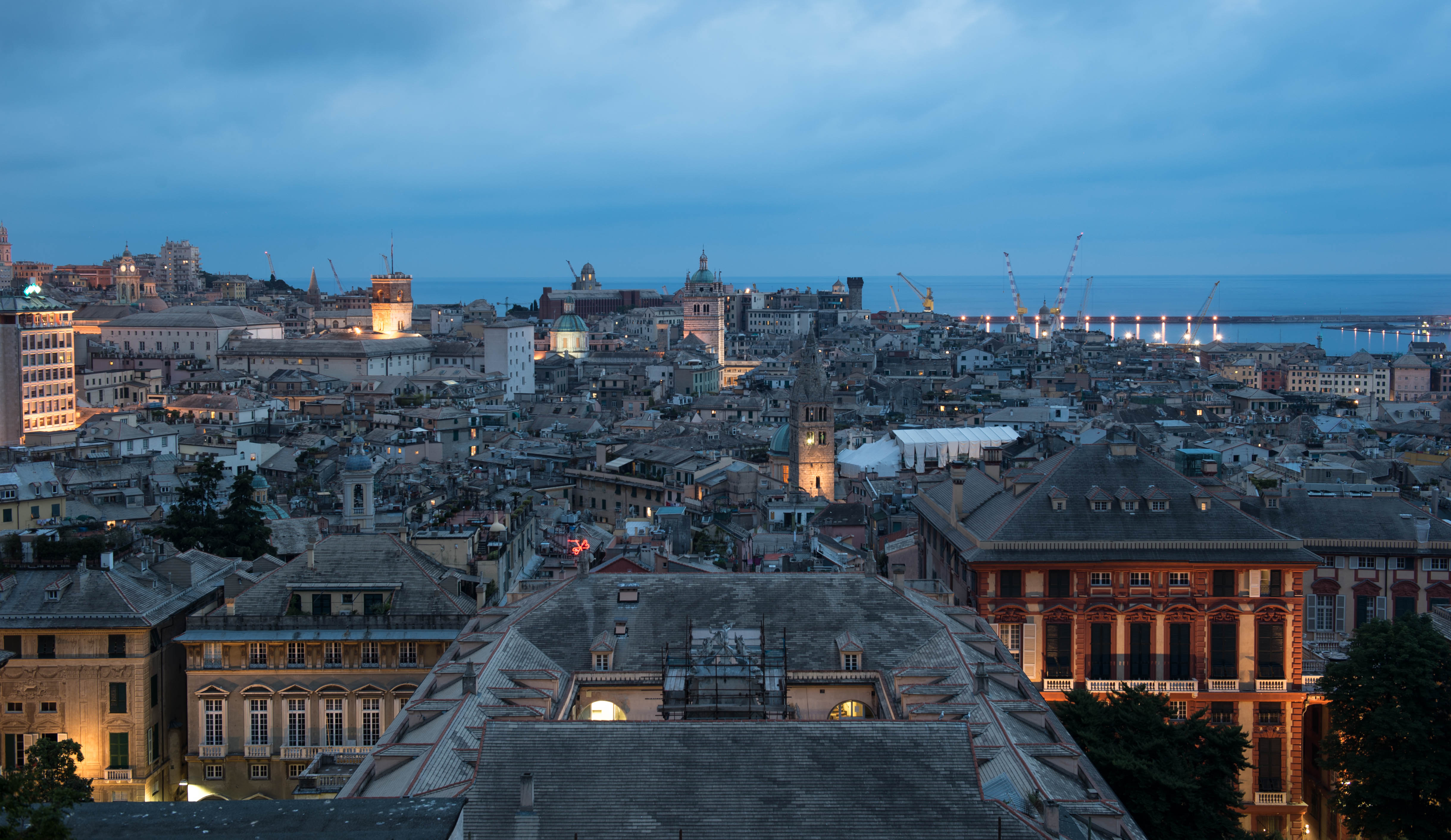
Genoa

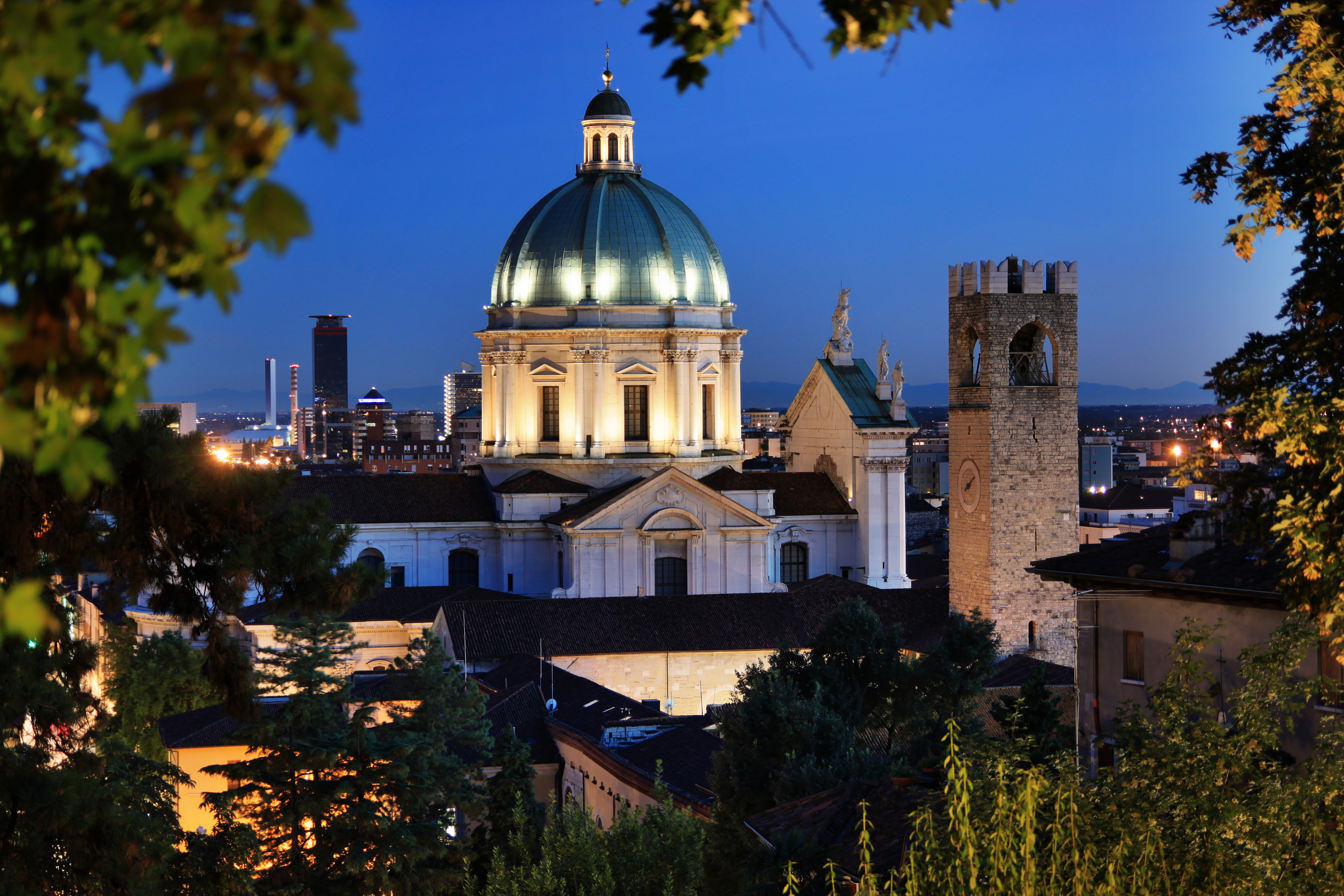
Brescia

Below is the list of the most populous cities with more than 50,000 inhabitants:

City	Region	Population (2026)
Milan	Lombardy	1,362,863
Turin	Piedmont	855,654
Genoa	Liguria	566,247
Brescia	Lombardy	201,342
Monza	Lombardy	123,672
Bergamo	Lombardy	120,629
Novara	Piedmont	103,238
Alessandria	Piedmont	93,409
La Spezia	Liguria	92,610
Busto Arsizio	Lombardy	84,595
Como	Lombardy	83,035
Varese	Lombardy	79,100
Sesto San Giovanni	Lombardy	78,850
Cinisello Balsamo	Lombardy	75,154
Asti	Piedmont	73,604
Pavia	Lombardy	71,811
Cremona	Lombardy	71,093
Vigevano	Lombardy	63,480
Legnano	Lombardy	60,980
Savona	Liguria	58,421
Cuneo	Piedmont	55,747
Moncalieri	Piedmont	55,442
Sanremo	Liguria	53,157
Gallarate	Lombardy	53,023
Rho	Lombardy	51,000
Mantua	Lombardy	50,215

=== Immigration ===
As of 2025, immigrants make up 14.4% of the population. The 5 largest foreign countries of birth are Romania, Albania, Morocco, Egypt, and Ukraine.

== Economy ==
The gross domestic product (GDP) of the region was 580.3 billion euro in 2018, accounting for 32.9% of Italy's economic output. GDP per capita adjusted for purchasing power was 35,900 euro or 119% of the EU27 average in the same year.

== See also ==
- National Institute of Statistics (Italy)
- NUTS statistical regions of Italy
- Italian NUTS level 1 regions:
  - Northeast Italy
  - South Italy
  - Insular Italy
- Northern Italy
- Central Italy
- Southern Italy
