= La monaca di Monza =

La monaca di Monza (the Nun of Monza) may refer to:

- La monaca di Monza (1947 film), a film starring Rossano Brazzi
- La monaca di Monza (1962 film), a film starring Giovanna Ralli
- La monaca di Monza (1969 film), a film starring Anne Heywood
- La monaca di Monza (1987 film), a film starring Alessandro Gassman
- Virginia, la monaca di Monza, a film starring Giovanna Mezzogiorno
