= Devils of Monza =

- Directed by: Luciano Odorisio
- Written by: Gino Capone; Carlo Lizzani; Luciano Odorisio; Piero Chiara
- Produced by: Giovanni Di Clemente
- Starring: Myriem Roussel; Alessandro Gassmann
- Cinematography: Romano Albani
- Music by: Pino Donaggio
- Release date: 1987
- Language: Italian

Devils of Monza (Italian: La monaca di Monza, also known as Sacrilege) is a 1987 Italian historical erotic-drama film directed by Luciano Odorisio. It is based on real-life events related to Marianna de Leyva, better known as Sister Virginia Maria, "The Nun of Monza", whose story was made famous by Alessandro Manzoni's novel The Betrothed.

Like Hail Mary (1986), Devils of Monza features Myriem Roussel in scenes of full frontal nudity. The film is considered part of the Nunsploitation subgenre, but despite its exploitative nature, the story it presents is largely faithful to the facts and testimony as recounted in Mario Mazzucchelli's nonfiction book The Nun of Monza (1963), although it renders explicit some elements of the case which Mazzucchelli presents as hearsay or speculative.

The story of the Nun of Monza has inspired other films, including La monaca di Monza (1962), Il monaco di Monza (a.k.a. The Monk of Monza, 1962), The Lady of Monza (a.k.a.The Awful Story of the Nun of Monza, 1969), The True Story of the Nun of Monza (a.k.a. La vera storia della monaca di Monza, 1980), Virginia, la monaca di Monza (2004), and Sometimes the Good Kill (2017).

== Plot ==
Set in a nunnery in early-17th century Monza, Northern Italy, the film depicts the clandestine sexual relationship between a beautiful young nun of noble birth, Sister Virginia Maria de Leyva, and a rakish local aristocrat, Gian Paolo Osio, whose estate is adjacent to the nunnery.

Osio is attracted to the proud, haughty, and sexually repressed Sister Virginia, and attempts to court her with letters and charms provided by his lecherous friend, corrupt local priest Father Paolo Arrigone. Osio gains access to the nunnery via counterfeit keys provided by a local blacksmith. Inside the nunnery, Osio rapes Virginia in full view of her appalled roommates, Sisters Benedetta and Ottavia.

The relationship between Virginia and Osio becomes consensual and the pair engage in a series of increasingly passionate trysts, even as Virginia presents to the other nuns and the outside world the appearance of piousness and celibacy. Virginia's subordinates and confidants, Sisters Benedetta and Ottavia, become aroused by Virginia and Osio's lovemaking, and engage in mutual masturbation as they watch Osio perform cunnilingus on Virginia.

Virginia alternates between gratifying her lust and feeling tremendous guilt for her sins. She also becomes fearful that her improper relationship with Osio will be exposed. Later, when Virginia falls ill and bedridden, the lustful Sister Benedetta takes advantage of the situation and confesses to Osio the love she claims she and Sister Ottavia have for him. A weakened and distraught Virginia cries as she watches Osio, Benedetta, and Ottavia have sex.

Osio's friend, Father Paolo, imposes himself further into the growing scandal by molesting one of the nuns, Sister Candida. Virginia falls pregnant by Osio and gives birth in secret to an illegitimate child.

A rebellious novice, Caterina, runs afoul of Virginia's discipline. Disgusted by Virginia's hypocrisy, Caterina threatens to expose the nun's affair with Osio and the existence of their illegitimate child. Virginia has Caterina locked in a barn and Osio later murders her and disposes of her body. Father Paolo decides to blackmail Osio.

The convent is rocked by increasingly scandalous rumours, and suspicion surrounding Caterina's disappearance, all of which derail Virginia's attempt to become nunnery's Mother superior. The situation escalates when Federico Borromeo, cardinal and Archbishop of Milan, orders an official investigation. Virginia is arrested and questioned by Church authorities.

A desperate and increasingly murderous Osio sets about to silence the accomplices who can incriminate him. He kills the blacksmith who forged the keys that allowed him to infiltrate the nunnery. He then persuades Sisters Benedetta and Ottavia that they are in danger and need to flee with him. Away from the nunnery, Osio attacks the two nuns and leaves them for dead. The wounded pair are later discovered and questioned. Osio becomes a wanted fugitive with a price of 1000 scudi on his head.

Although he loves Virginia, Osio refuses to accept responsibility for his part in her downfall. He writes a self-serving letter to Cardinal Borromeo and seeks refuge with a friend, the aristocrat Cesare Taverna. Taverna betrays Osio and has him stabbed to death.

The confessions and testimony extracted by the investigator appointed by Borromeo are sufficient to find Virginia, her collaborators, and Father Paolo guilty. Virginia admits to her sins but claims she did so under diabolical influence and always practised self-admonishment.

Virginia is sentenced to lifetime solitary imprisonment in a small stone cell. En route to her cell, Virginia catches a glimpse of Sisters Benedetta and Ottavia, also punished for their complicity in her crimes.

A closing caption states Virginia was released after serving 13 years of her sentence and impressed Borromeo with her repentance, which had taken on an entranced, mystical quality. Surviving the Plague, she eventually died at the age of seventy-four.

== Cast ==
- Myriem Roussel as Sister Virginia Maria de Leyva
- Alessandro Gassman as Gian Paolo Osio
- Renato De Carmine as Cardinal Federico Borromeo
- Alina De Simone as Reverend Mother
- Augusto Zucchi as Father Paolo Arrigone
- Cyrus Elias as Giuseppe Molteno
- Flaminia Lizzani as Sister Benedetta
- Almerica Schiavo as Sister Ottavia
- Coralina Cataldi-Tassoni as Sister Candida
- Leonardo De Carmine as Cesare Taverna

== Release ==
Devils of Monza was released theatrically in Italy in December 1987 and went straight to video in some European territories. It was released on home video in the United Kingdom in December 1987.

A region-free NTSC DVD of Devils of Monza, under the film's North American title Sacrilege, was released by Jef Films in 2008; the film's transfer appears to have been taken from a VHS copy.

The film has been released on Region 2 DVD in several editions in European territories, including a limited edition release in 2014 by the German distributor '84 Entertainment, which features German and Italian language versions of the film and contains extra features (including the complete music score as isolated tracks, and the film's German theatrical trailer). Although the film is complete, the audio and visual quality of the '84 Entertainment Devils of Monza is inconsistent; the distributor appeared to use a censored print of the film for the majority of the presentation, with several sex scenes inserted from lower-quality (presumably VHS) sources.

Pino Donaggio's Devils of Monza score, under the title La Monaca Di Monza, was released as a soundtrack album by Mercury Records in 1987 (vinyl) and by Emergency Music in 2005 (compact disc). The soundtrack's twenty musical cues are included in the aforementioned '84 Entertainment DVD release of the film.

== Reception ==
Tim Lucas of Video Watchdog described Devils of Monza as "an elegantly crafted little gem...exquisitely photographed by Romano Albani [with] one of Pino Donaggio's most beautiful scores," and singled out Myriem Roussel's performance for praise:

...what is most lingering about the picture is what lingers about the films Roussel made with Godard: the devotion it pays to her Renaissant loveliness, which somehow looks as much at home in a nun's habit as in the basketball uniform she sports in Hail Mary. There's a scene in Sacrilege where Sister Virginia, awakening to her sexuality under the smouldering, corruptive gaze of neighboring nobleman Giampaolo Osio (Alessandro Gassman), looks into a mirror and pulls her habit away from a cascade of long auburn hair. The effect is nearly breathtaking... What makes this moment so powerful is how, in the space of these few frames, Roussel's expression subtly morphs from timid curiosity to combined arousal and sorrow -- she tears her habit like a hymen -- and then from awe at her mirror's disclosure of her sensuality to a final expression that shows contempt for her vanity as she feels herself empowered by it. It is the moment of Sister Virginia's emergence as a complete, sexual being, body and soul, and by this point in the movie, we feel our heart breaking for her as it also pounds for her.
