= Timeline of Milan =

The following is a timeline of the history of the city of Milan, Italy.

== BC era ==
- 400 BCE - Founded by the Celts under the name Medhelanon.
- 222 BCE - Medhelanon was conquered by the ancient Romans, who Latinized the name of the city into Mediolanum.
- 49 BCE - Mediolanum becomes municipium.

== 3rd–8th centuries ==
- 3rd C. CE - Roman Catholic diocese of Milan established.
- 286 CE - Western Roman Empire capital moves from Rome to Mediolanum.
- 313 - Edict of Milan.
- 370 - Basilica of San Lorenzo consecrated.
- 379 - Basilica of Sant'Ambrogio consecrated.
- 382 - San Nazaro in Brolo construction begins.
- 402 - City besieged by Visigoths.
- 452 - City besieged by Huns.
- 539 - City sacked by Ostrogoths.
- 569 - Lombards conquer city.
- 774 - Milan surrenders to the Franks.
- 833 - San Vincenzo in Prato built.
- 899 - Hunnish invasion

== 11th century ==
- 1045 - Milan adopts the commune form of local city-state government.

== 12th–14th centuries ==
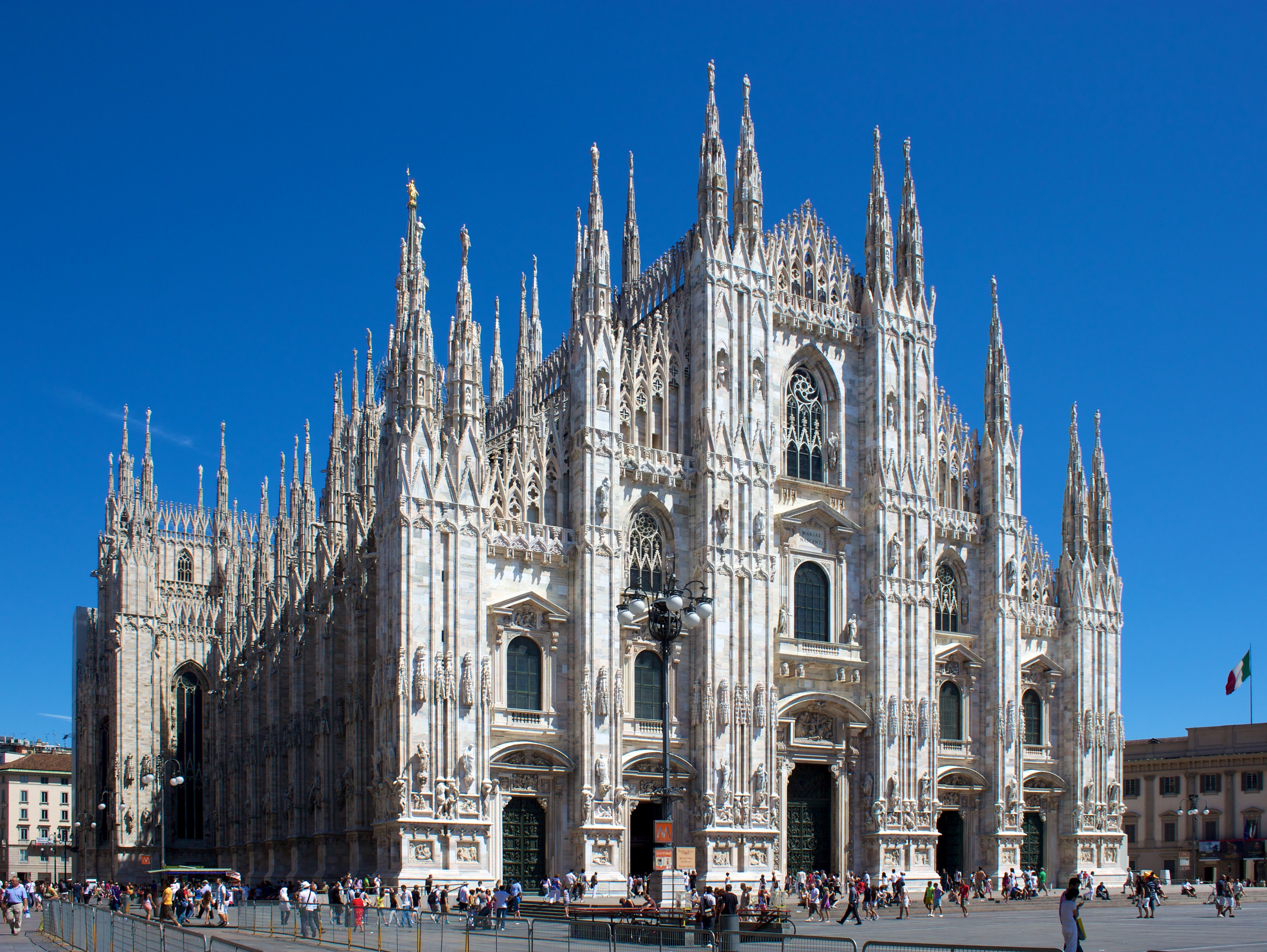
Ground was broken for Milan Cathedral in 1386

- 1135 - Chiaravalle Abbey founded.
- 1157 - Circular moat, (Naviglio), constructed round the town.
- 1158 - Holy Roman Emperor Frederick Barbarossa besieges and sacks the city, but it soon rebels.
- 1162 - Holy Roman Emperor Frederick Barbarossa seizes and destroys the city.
- 1183 - After the Peace of Constance Milan returns to the commune form of government.
- 13th C. - Palazzo Borromeo (Milan) established.
- 1233 - Palazzo della Ragione built.
- 1237 - After the Battle of Cortenuova Pagano della Torre rallied and saved Milan.
- 1259 - Milan is ruled as a Signoria with the Della Torre family ruling as Signores.
- 1277
  - The Battle of Desio is fought between the Della Torre and Visconti families for the control of Milan.
  - The Visconti of Milan emerges as the victors at Desio and begin their rule of Milan as the Signores.
- 1302 - Guido della Torre deposes Matteo I Visconti as the Signore.
- 1311 - Henry VII restores Matteo I Visconti as the Signore.
- 1321 - Loggia degli Osii built, with two open porticos in black and white marble.
- 1330
  - Piazza del Duomo, Milan work begins.
  - San Gottardo, Milan work begins.
- 1336 - Public clock installed.
- 1360 - Castello Sforzesco construction begun.
- 1381 - Chiesa di Santa Maria alla Scala built.
- 1386 - Milan Cathedral begins construction.
- 1395 - Milan is formally elevated to a Duchy when Wenceslaus IV titles Gian Galeazzo Visconti the Duke of Milan.

== 15th–16th centuries ==
- 1412 - Gian Maria Visconti assassinated in front of the San Gottardo, Milan.
- 1447
  - The death of Filippo Maria Visconti (1392–1447) ends more than two centuries of Visconti rule in Milan.
  - The Golden Ambrosian Republic begins.
- 1450 - The House of Sforza takes power.
- 1456 - Ospedale Maggiore begins construction.
- 1463 - Santa Maria delle Grazie, Milan begun.
- 1471 - Printing press in operation.
- 1482 - Santa Maria delle Grazie built.
- 1493 - Santa Maria presso San Celso begins construction.
- 1496 - Chiesa di Santa Maria della Passione built.
- 1497 - Apicius de re Coquinaria cookbook published.
- 1498 - Leonardo paints The Last Supper in the Santa Maria delle Grazie church.
- 1508 - Santa Maria alla Fontana built.
- 1515 - Battle of Marignano and Francis I of France takes Milan.
- 1522 - Francesco II Sforza in power.
- 1535 - City becomes part of Habsburg Spain.
- 1562 - Palazzo dei Giureconsulti begins construction.
- 1565 - Casa degli Omenoni built (approximate date).
- 1577 - Milan Cathedral consecrated by Charles Borromeo, cardinal saint.
- 1579 - San Fedele built.
- 1580 - Plague.

== 17th century ==
- 1608 - Palazzo del Senato construction begins.
- 1609 - Biblioteca Ambrosiana opens.
- 1618 - Pinacoteca Ambrosiana opens.
- 1630 - Plague begins.
- 1631 - Palazzo Annoni construction begins.
- 1640 - The gazette named Milano was published for the first time.
- 1644 - Palazzo delle Scuole Palatine rebuilt.

== 18th century ==
- 1717 - Teatro Regio Ducale built.
- 1761 - Palazzo Litta built.
- 1762 - Madonnina (statue) erected.
- 1772 - Royal Palace of Milan renovated.
- 1774 - Orto Botanico di Brera (garden) established.
- 1776 - Brera Academy founded.
- 1778
  - La Scala inaugurated.
  - Royal Palace of Milan expanded.
- 1779 - Teatro Lirico built.
- 1784 - Giardini Pubblici Indro Montanelli established.
- 1785 - The newspaper Il Corriere di Gabinetto - Gazzetta di Milano was published for the first time.
- 1786
  - Biblioteca di Brera (library) opens.
  - Archivio di Stato di Milano (state archives) established.
- 1793 - Palazzo Serbelloni built.
- 1796 - Milan declared capital of Cisalpine Republic.
- 1797 - 1st Grenadier Battalion and 2nd Rifle Battalion of the Polish Legions founded in Milan.

== 19th century ==
- 1802 - Milan becomes capital of the Napoleonic Italian Republic.
- 1805 - Coronation of Napoleon as King of Italy.
- 1807
  - Milan Conservatory established.
  - Arena Civica opened.
- 1808
  - Milan Stock Exchange established.
  - Casa Ricordi music publisher in business.
- 1817 - Caffè Cova in business on Via Monte Napoleone.
- 1820 - Revolutionary Carbonari arrested.
- 1824 - Pasticceria Marchesi in business.
- 1838 - Museo Civico di Storia Naturale di Milano founded.
- 1840 - Milan-Monza railway begins operating.
- 1842 - Premiere of Verdi's opera Nabucco.
- 1848 - Five Days uprising against Austrian Empire.
- 1853 - abortive Milan Uprising against Austrian rule.
- 1860
  - Campari in business.
  - Antonio Beretta becomes mayor.
- 1861
  - Milan becomes part of Kingdom of Italy.
  - City hall opens in Palazzo Marino.
- 1863 - Istituto Tecnico Superiore founded.
- 1864 - Stazione di Milano Centrale (1864) opens at Piazza della Repubblica (Milan).
- 1866 - Cimitero Monumentale di Milano opened.
- 1870 - Hoepli publisher in business.
- 1871 - Population: 261,976.
- 1872
  - Pirelli company founded.
  - Ca' de Sass built.
  - Teatro Dal Verme opens.
- 1873 - Società Storica Lombarda (history society) founded.
- 1876
  - Corriere della Sera newspaper begins publication.
  - Trams begin operating.
- 1877 - Galleria Vittorio Emanuele II built.
- 1879
  - Milano Affori railway station and Milano Bovisa-Politecnico railway station open.
  - "Società d'Esplorazione Commerciale in Africa" founded.
- 1881 - Population: 321,839.
- 1883 - Salumi Peck (company) in business.
- 1886
  - Breda manufactory in business.
  - German School of Milan founded.
  - Piazza della Scala established.
- 1888
  - Parco Sempione established.
  - Via Dante constructed.

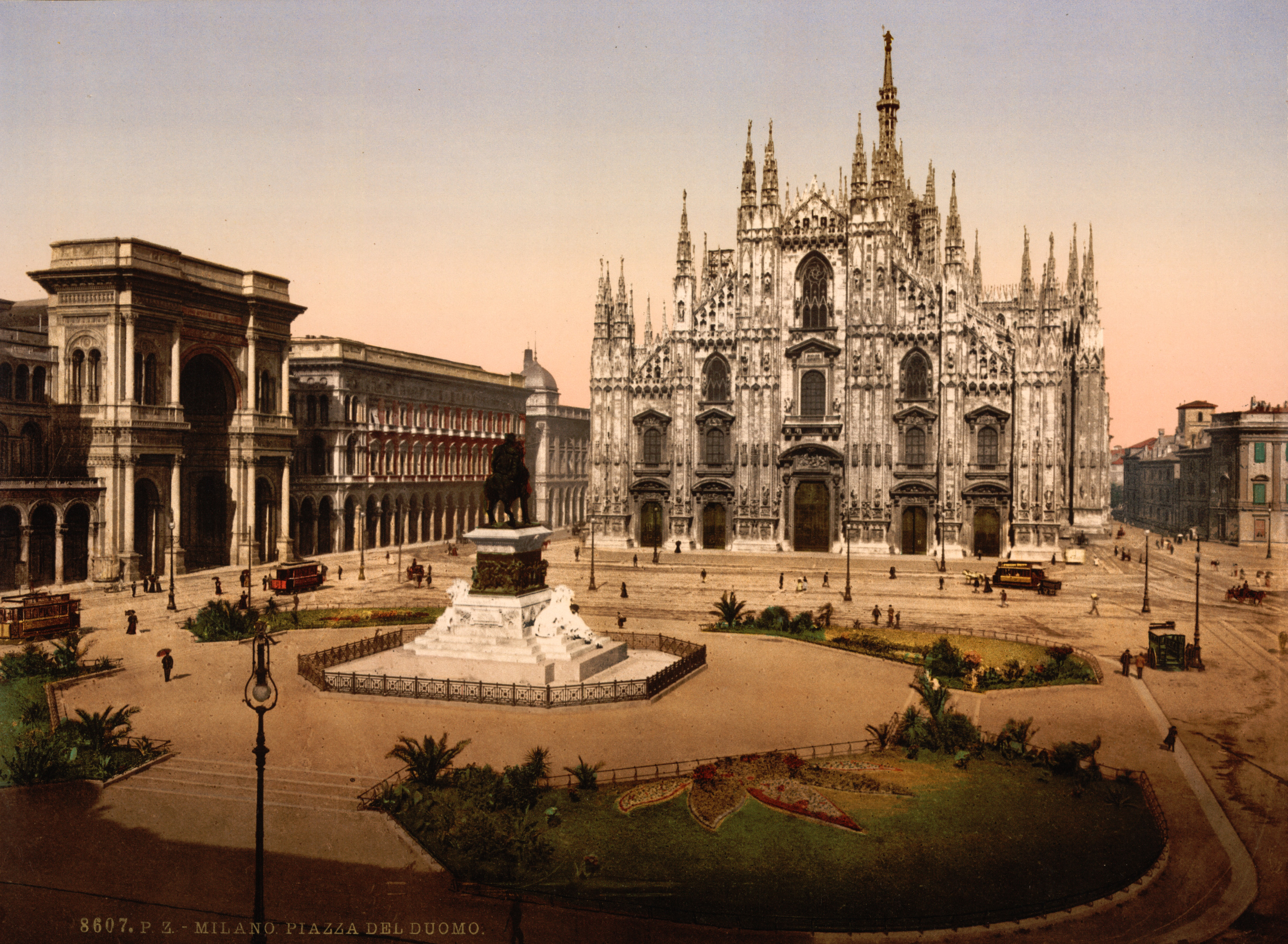
Milan in the 1890s

- 1891 - Camera del Lavoro (labor centre) and Società escursionisti milanesi (hiking club) founded.
- 1894 - Touring Club Italiano established.
- 1896
  - Casa di Riposo per Musicisti founded.
  - Italo Pacchioni creates "first Italian film" Arrivo del treno alla Stazione di Milano.
- 1897 - Population: 470,558.
- 1898 - Bava-Beccaris massacre.
- 1899
  - Milan Football and Cricket Club founded.
  - Parini statue erected in Piazza Cordusio.

== 20th century ==
=== 1900s–1940s ===
- 1902 - Bocconi University founded.
- 1903 - Palazzo Castiglioni built.
- 1906
  - Confederazione Generale del Lavoro (labor union) headquartered in Milan.
  - Milan International (1906) world's fair held
  - Simplon Tunnel opens.
  - Casa Campanini built.
  - Population: 560,613.
- 1907 - Turci Calzature (shoe shop) in business.
- 1908 - Internazionale Milano football club founded.
- 1909 - Malpensa Airport established.
- 1911 - Bar Jamaica in business.
- 1912 - Messina tram depot built.
- 1915
  - Castello Cova built.
  - American Chamber of Commerce established.
- 1917
  - Galleria Pesaro opens.
  - La Rinascente (shop) in business.
- 1919
  - March: Fascio di Combattimento political group founded.
  - August: Honorary Consulate of Poland opened, later elevated to Consulate-General (see Italy–Poland relations).
- 1921
  - Milan Sample Fair begins.
  - Università Cattolica del Sacro Cuore established.
- 1922 - Novecento Italiano art movement active.
- 1924 - University of Milan founded.
- 1926 - Stadio San Siro opens.
- 1927 - A. Rizzoli & Co. founded.
- 1930 - Planetario di Milano inaugurated.
- 1931 - Milano Centrale railway station opens.
- 1932 - Palazzo Mezzanotte (stock exchange) built.
- 1933
  - Trolleybuses begin operating.
  - Torre Branca built in Parco Sempione.
- 1934 - Institute for International Political Studies founded.

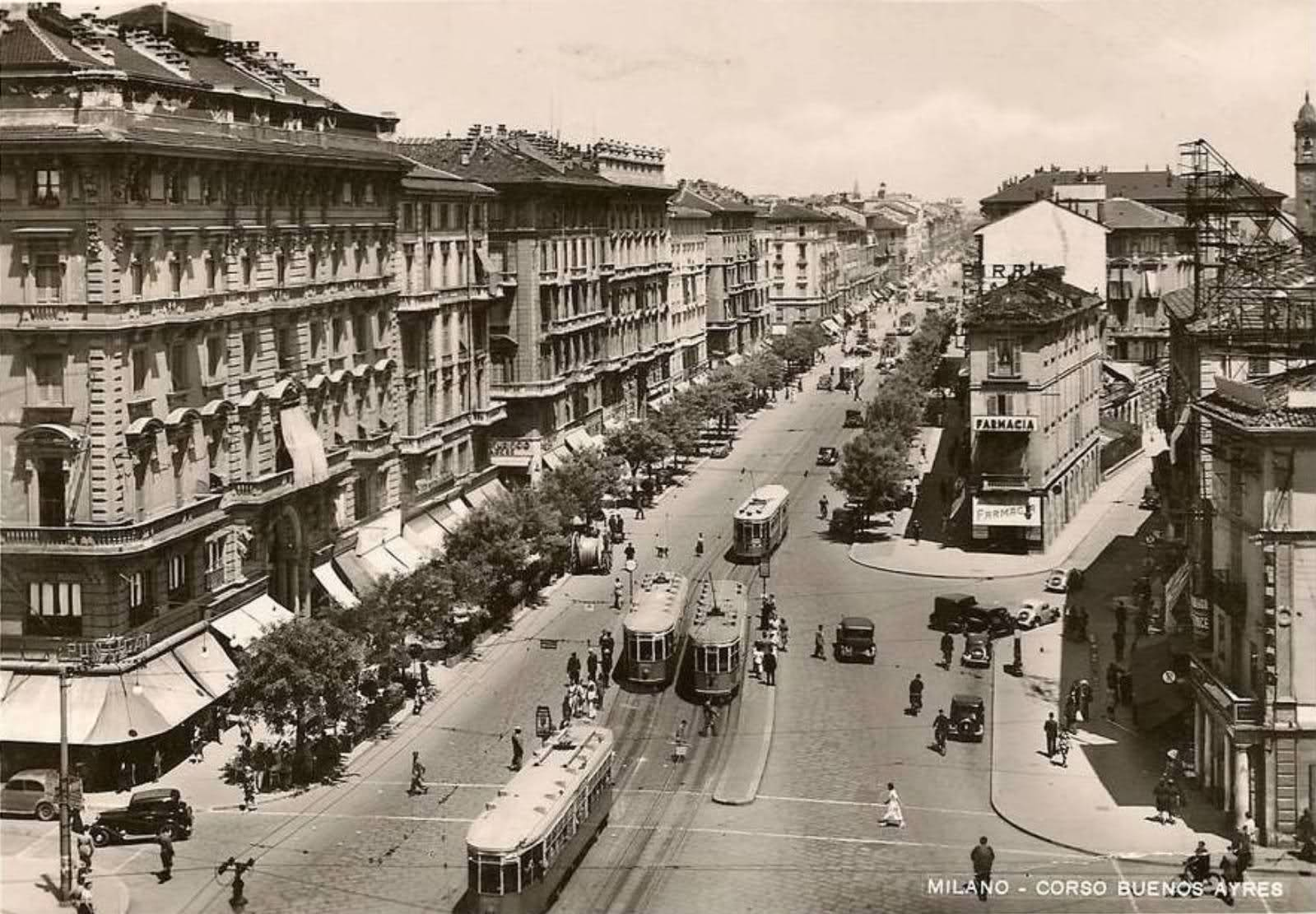
Milan in 1935

- 1935 - Villa Necchi Campiglio (residence) built.
- 1937 - Linate Airport opens.
- 1939
  - A.C. Milan football club active.
  - Anteo Spazio Cinema opens.
- 1942 - Teatro Smeraldo opens.
- 1945 - 29 April: Corpse of executed Mussolini brought to Piazzale Loreto.
- 1947 - Piccolo Teatro founded.

=== 1950s–1990s ===
- 1954 - Padiglione d'Arte Contemporanea inaugurated.
- 1955
  - FrancoAngeli publisher in business.
  - Centro di Documentazione Ebraica Contemporanea founded.
- 1956 - Palazzo dell'Arengario built.
- 1958 - Milan Fashion Week begins.
- 1960 - Cinema Ambasciatori opens.
- 1961 - Milan Furniture Fair begins.
- 1962 - Amica fashion magazine in publication.
- 1964 - Milan Metro begins operating.
- 1965 - Milan Cathedral final details completed.
- 1968 - IULM University of Milan founded.
- 1969 - Piazza Fontana bombing.
- 1974 - Quelli di Grock theatre troupe founded.
- 1975 - Armani fashion house founded.
- 1979 - MIP- Politecnico di Milano School of Management formed.
- 1980
  - Plastic (nightclub) opens.
  - Parco Alessandrini inaugurated.
- 1982 - Domus Academy established.
- 1985 - Dolce & Gabbana fashion house founded.
- 1986 - Class Editori founded.
- 1987
  - MF Milano Finanza newspaper begins publication.
  - Massimo De Carlo art gallery opens.
- 1990
  - Milan Metro Line 3 begins operating.
  - Parco Agricolo Sud Milano established.
- 1991
  - July: City hosts the final round of the 1991 FIVB Volleyball World League.
  - Viafarini (art entity) established.
  - 10 Corso Como in business.
- 1994 - July: City hosts the final round of the 1994 FIVB Volleyball World League.
- 1995 - Documentation Center for Visual Arts founded.
- 1996 - Vita-Salute San Raffaele University and Trussardi Foundation established.
- 1997 - Milan Passante railway begins operating.
- 1998
  - June: University of Milan Bicocca established.
  - July: City hosts the final round of the 1998 FIVB Volleyball World League.
- 1999 - Malpensa Express begins operating.

== 21st century ==
- 2001
  - 23 May: 2001 UEFA Champions League Final held in Milan.
  - 8 October: 2001 Linate Airport runway collision.
  - City website online (approximate date).
  - O’artoteca (art organization) founded.
- 2002
  - Orto Botanico di Cascina Rosa established.
  - Teatro degli Arcimboldi opens.
- 2004
  - Gruppo A12 architects active.
  - Bulgari Hotel in business.
- 2006
  - Lettera27 headquartered in Milan.
  - Letizia Moratti becomes mayor.
- 2008
  - BikeMi launched.
  - Ecopass congestion charge begins.
- 2009
  - Peep Hole and Cardi Black Box art gallery active.
  - Homeless World Cup football contest held.
- 2010 - Population: 1,315,803.
- 2011 - Giuliano Pisapia becomes mayor.
- 2012
  - Portello Park inaugurated.
  - Milan Area C congestion charge begins, replacing Ecopass.
  - Nuovo Trasporto Viaggiatori high-speed train service begins operating, connecting Milan to Naples via Rome.
- 2013 - Population: 1,262,101 municipality; 3,075,083 province.
- 2015 - 1 May: Expo 2015 world fair opens.
- 2016 - June: Milan municipal election, 2016 held.
- 2026 - Milan co-hosts the 2026 Winter Olympics and 2026 Winter Paralympics between February and March.

== See also ==
- History of Milan (it)
- List of mayors of Milan
- List of rulers of Milan

Timelines of other cities in the macroregion of Northwest Italy:^{(it)}

- Liguria region: Timeline of Genoa
- Lombardy region: Timeline of Bergamo; Brescia; Cremona; Mantua; Pavia
- Piedmont region: Timeline of Novara; Turin

== Bibliography ==
=== Published in the 16th-19th century ===
in English

- Jedidiah Morse; Richard C. Morse (1823), "Milan", A New Universal Gazetteer (4th ed.), New Haven: S. Converse
- David Brewster, ed. (1830). "Milan". Edinburgh Encyclopaedia. Edinburgh: William Blackwood.
- Josiah Conder (1834), "Milan", Italy, The Modern Traveller, vol. 31, London: J.Duncan
- Mariana Starke (1839), "Milan", Travels in Europe (9th ed.), Paris: A. and W. Galignani
- "Milan". Italy and its Comforts. London: Longman. 1842.
- "Milan", Black's Guide to Italy, Edinburgh: Adam and Charles Black, 1869
- William Smith, ed. (1872) [1854]. "Mediolanum". Dictionary of Greek and Roman Geography. London: John Murray. hdl:2027/hvd.ah5cur.
- "Milan", Ballou's Monthly Magazine, Boston: Thomes & Talbot, pp. 55 v, February 1875, hdl:2027/nyp.33433081755823
- Fin Bec (August 1876), "Under Foreign Mahogany: Hotel Life in Milan", Gentleman's Magazine, London
- George Henry Townsend (1877), "Milan", A Manual of Dates (5th ed.), London: Frederick Warne & Co., hdl:2027/wu.89097349427
- "Milan", Cook's Tourist's Handbook for Northern Italy, London: T. Cook & Son, 1881
- J. Hardmeyer (1884), Milan, Illustrated Europe, Zurich: Orell Füssli & Co.
- W. Pembroke Fetridge (1884), "Milan", Harper's Hand-Book for Travellers in Europe and the East (23rd ed.), New York: Harper & Brothers, hdl:2027/nyp.33433066588363
- "Milan", Appleton's European Guide Book, New York: D. Appleton & Co., 1888
- "Milan", Bradshaw's Illustrated Hand-book to Italy, London: W.J. Adams & Sons, 1894
- "Milan", Hand-book for Travellers in Northern Italy (16th ed.), London: John Murray, 1897, OCLC 2231483

in other languages

- Corio, Bernardino (1554), L'historia di Milano (in Italian), Vinegia: Giovan Maria Bonelli, OL 22885135M
- Morigia, Paolo (1595), La nobiltà di Milano, Milan: Pontio; 2nd edn (1619) with additions by Girolamo Borsieri, Milan: Bidelli.
- Guide des étrangers à Milan et dans les environs de cette ville (in French), Milan: Pierre et Joseph Vallardi, 1819, OL 25596877M
- Pietro Verri (1850), Storia di Milano (in Italian), Milano: Oliva, OL 24138005M
- "Milano". Nuova Enciclopedia Italiana (in Italian) (6th ed.). Torino: Unione Tipografico-Editrice Torinese. 1887. hdl:2027/nnc1.cu08476810.

=== Published in the 20th century ===
in English

- George Charles Williamson (1901), "Milan", Cities of Northern Italy, New York: A. Wessels company, OCLC 6516634
- Cecilia M. Ady (1907), History of Milan under the Sforza, London: Methuen & Co., OCLC 4369439, OL 6994215M
- Milan, Mediaeval Towns, London: J.M. Dent & Co., 1908
- Brown, Horatio Robert Forbes; Ashby, Thomas (1910). "Milan" . Encyclopædia Britannica. Vol. 18 (11th ed.). pp. 437–441.
- Benjamin Vincent (1910), "Milan", Haydn's Dictionary of Dates (25th ed.), London: Ward, Lock & Co., hdl:2027/loc.ark:/13960/t89g6g776 – via HathiTrust
- "Milan", Northern Italy (14th ed.), Leipzig: Karl Baedeker, 1913 + 1870 ed.
- W.J. Rolfe (1914), "Milan", Satchel Guide for the Vacation Tourist in Europe, Boston: Houghton Mifflin, hdl:2027/mdp.39015065280888
- John Foot (1995). "The Family and the 'Economic Miracle': Social Transformation, Work, Leisure and Development at Bovisa and Comasina (Milan), 1950-70". Contemporary European History. 4 (3): 315–338. doi:10.1017/s0960777300003507. JSTOR 20081556. S2CID 145084971.
- Trudy Ring, ed. (1996). "Milan". Southern Europe. International Dictionary of Historic Places. Vol. 3. Fitzroy Dearborn. OCLC 31045650.
- John Foot (1999). "Television and the City: The Impact of Television in Milan, 1954-1960". Contemporary European History. 8 (3): 379–394. doi:10.1017/S0960777399003033. JSTOR 20081718. PMID 20120561. S2CID 35221104.
- Stefano D'Amico (2000). "Crisis and Transformation: Economic Organization and Social Structures in Milan, 1570-1610". Social History. 25 (1): 1–21. doi:10.1080/030710200363249. JSTOR 4286606. S2CID 145362967.

in Italian

- Francesco Malaguzzi Valeri (1906), Milano (in Italian), Bergamo: Istituto Italiano d'Arti Grafiche, OL 22335383M
- "Milano". Piemonte, Lombardia, Canton Ticino. Guida d'Italia (in Italian). Milan: Touring Club Italiano. 1916. p. 5+. hdl:2027/uiuo.ark:/13960/t1rf92c9w.
- Storia di Milano (in Italian). Fondazione Treccani. OCLC 461149469. 1953-1966 (17 volumes)
- Luigi Ganapini. Una città in guerra (Milano, 1939-1951) (Milan: Angeli, 1988)
- Achille Rastelli. Bombe sulla città. Gli attacchi aerei alleati: le vittime civili a Milano (Milan: Mursia, 2000)

=== Published in the 21st century ===
in English

- "History of Italy". HistoryWorld. p. 2.
- Lecco, Alberto; Foot, John (2020). "Milan Italy". Encyclopedia Britannica. Encyclopedia Britannica, Inc.
- Stefano D'Amico (2001). "Rebirth of a City: Immigration and Trade in Milan, 1630-59". The Sixteenth Century Journal. 32 (3): 697–721. doi:10.2307/2671508. JSTOR 2671508. PMID 18939327.
- Anna Trono; Maria Chiara Zerbi (2002). "Milan: The city of constant renewal". GeoJournal. 58 (1): 65. Bibcode:2002GeoJo..58...65T. doi:10.1023/B:GEJO.0000006569.84532.7d.
- Elisabetta Merlo; Francesca Polese (2006). "Turning Fashion into Business: The Emergence of Milan as an International Fashion Hub". Business History Review. 80 (3): 415–447. doi:10.1017/S0007680500035856. JSTOR 25097225. S2CID 156857344.
- ""Venice and Northern Italy, 1400–1600 A.D." Heilbrunn Timeline of Art History". The Met. The Metropolitan Museum of Art. 2019.
- "Insider's Guide to Milan", Wall Street Journal, 2 October 2010
- "You Know You're a Milan Insider When". New York Times. 15 October 2010.
- Chris Wickham (2015). "Milan". Sleepwalking into a New World: The Emergence of Italian City Communes in the Twelfth Century. Princeton University Press. pp. 21–66. ISBN 978-1-4008-6582-6.

in Italian

- Francesco Ogliari. Fiamme su Milano: I bombardamenti aerei 1940-1945 (Pavia: Selecta, 2005)
