= Gazzetta di Milano =

Gazzetta di Milano may refer to one of the following gazettes published in Milan in different times and by different publishers:

- Gazzetta di Milano (1769–1782), published as a continuation of the newspaper Milano by the publisher Malatesta
- Il Corriere di Gabinetto – Gazzetta di Milano, published by the publisher Pirola. From 21 May 1796 to 28 December 1797 it had the only title Gazzetta di Milano
- Gazzetta di Milano (1816–1875), published from 1816 to 1875
