= Osio =

Osio may refer to:

- Osio, Italian noble family who rose to prominence in Lombardy in the 12th century
- Felice Osio (1587–1631), Italian scholar
- Marco Osio (born 1966), Italian footballer
- Antonio Maria Osio (1800–1878), founder of the Mexican landgrant Rancho Punta de los Reyes Sobrante in Marin County, California, USA
- Osio Sopra, a town in Italy
- Osio Sotto, a town in Italy

== See also ==
- OS10 (disambiguation)
