= Io e mio figlio – Nuove storie per il commissario Vivaldi =

- Created by: Luciano Odorisio
- Country of origin: Italy

Io e mio figlio – Nuove storie per il commissario Vivaldi is an Italian television series.

== Cast ==
- Lando Buzzanca as Federico Vivaldi
- Giovanni Scifoni as Stefano Vivaldi
- Sergio Sivori as Saverio Stucchi
- Caterina Vertova as Laura
- Luigi Maria Burruano as Salvatore Girlando
- Alberto Molinari as Giulio Maria Zorzi
- Giuseppe Schisano as Damien Crescenzi
- Alessandra Celi as Monica Rovati
- Renato Marotta as Mazzola
- Elena Bouryka as Eva Ferrer
- Daniela Poggi as magistrate Flavia Conti
- Anna Orso as Maria Gradoli
- Simona Caparrini as Cristina Vallauro
- Paolo Romio as Yuri Tibaldi
- Morgana Forcella as Valentina
- Alberto Gimignani as Nicola Pinto
- Ornella Bonaccorsi as Dori Tancredi
- Andrea Meo as Enrico
- Andrea Montuschi as Pineschi
- Nicola Nocella as Guidolin
- Cristiana Lionello as Daria Volonghi
- Anna Ammirati as Claudia Porpora
