= Giovanni Scifoni =

Italian actor and theatre director

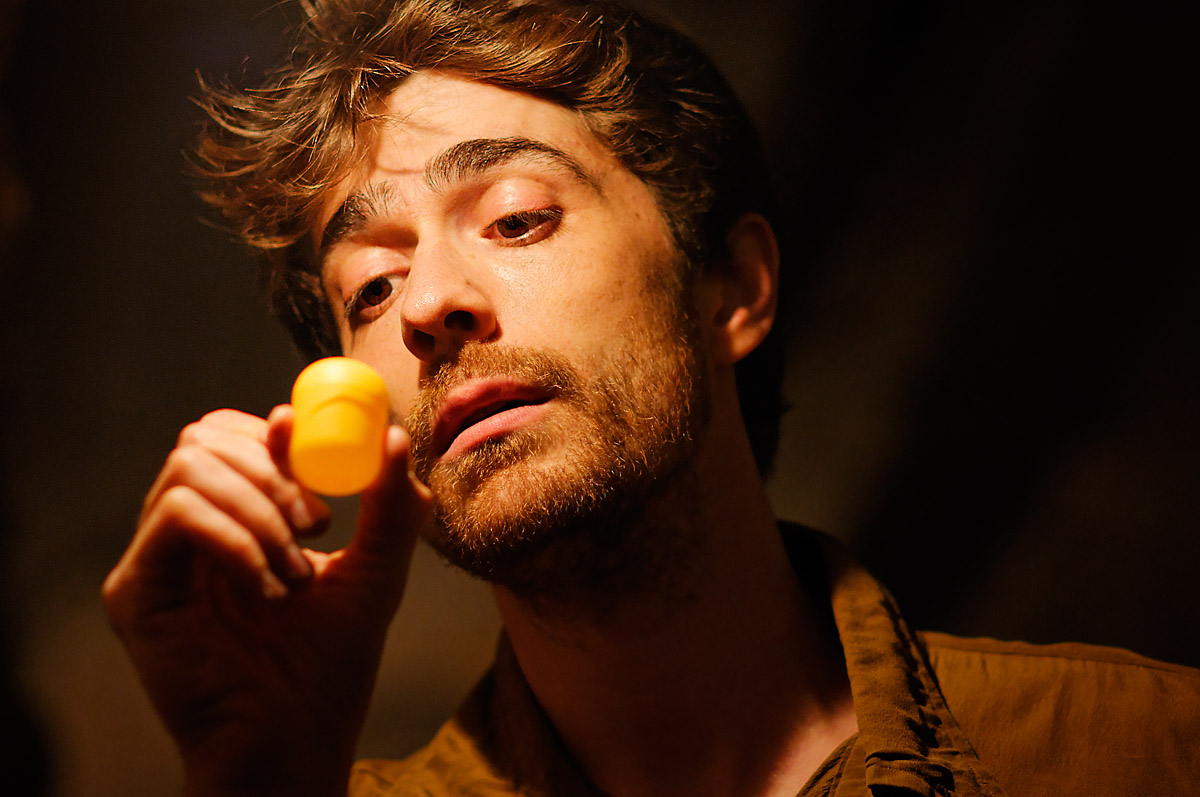
- Born: May 23, 1976 (age 49); Rome, Italy

Giovanni Scifoni (Italian pronunciation: [dʒoˈvanni ʃʃiˈfoːni]; born 23 May 1976 in Rome) is an Italian actor and theatre director. After musical studies (piano, singing) and first steps as a comic strip writer, he was selected to attend the Accademia Nazionale di Arte Drammatica Silvio D'Amico.

Right after graduation from the Accademia, he acted in various Italian tours of several national theater stars like Paolo Poli, Roberto Guicciardini, Sebastiano Lo Monaco and Patrick Rossi Gastaldi. He started also a collaboration as actor and director with the international company Gen Rosso.

He debuted in cinema with the Cannes-prized movie of Marco Tullio Giordana The Best of Youth (The Best of Youth), acting as Berto. The first starring role was in Mio figlio, followed by its sequel Io e mio figlio - Nuove storie per il commissario Vivaldi. Then followed several fiction movies.

As a theater actor and writer, he got the "Golden Graal" prize "Astro Nascente del Teatro" in 2011.

He's Roman Catholic.

== Filmography ==
- The Best of Youth, directed by Marco Tullio Giordana
- Mio figlio, directed by Luciano Odorisio
- Alba tremula, directed by Fabio Ianera
- L'onore e il rispetto, directed by Salvatore Samperi
- Io non dimentico, directed by Luciano Odorisio
- Un caso di coscienza 3, directed by Luigi Perelli
- Don Matteo 6, directed by Giulio Base, Fabrizio Costa and Elisabetta Marchetti - episode: La stanza di un angelo, directed by Elisabetta Marchetti (2008)
- Io e mio figlio - Nuove storie per il commissario Vivaldi, directed by Luciano Odorisio -
- Il peccato e la vergogna, directed by Luigi Parisi and Alessio Inturri
- Un medico in famiglia 7 - Rai Uno (2011)
- Pasolini, la verita' nascosta, directed by Federico Bruno
- Paura di amare 2, directed by Vincenzo Terracciano
