= Myriem Roussel =

French actress (born 1962)

Myriem Roussel (born 26 December 1961 in Rabat) is a French actress and model. She is best-known for her role as Marie in Jean-Luc Godard's 1985 film Hail Mary, which was controversial upon its release.

== Career ==
Roussel had come to Godard's attention when she appeared as an extra in his film Passion (1982). She appeared in Godard's First Name: Carmen (1983) and alongside Charlotte Rampling in Joy Fleury's Tristesse et beauté (1985), an adaptation of Yasunari Kawabata's 1964 novel Beauty and Sadness.

Roussel then starred in the central role of Marie in Godard's Hail Mary (1985), a modern retelling of the story of the virgin birth. The film's religious themes and scenes of full frontal nudity offended some Christians. Pope John Paul II criticized the film saying that it "deeply wounds the religious sentiments of believers." Protesters showed up at some theatres on opening night, and its premiere screening at the Sydney Film Festival was disrupted by protestors and a bomb threat that caused the theatre to be evacuated. Hail Mary's box-office admissions in France were relatively low and the film was banned in some countries. Of her work in Hail Mary, Roussel recounted to Gerald Peary,

Godard forced me to write down a diary of my thoughts, not regular writing but from my depths. I had no religious education, so I had to study the Bible. I watched Pasolini's film, The Gospel According to St. Matthew, and also Carl Dreyer's The Passion of Joan of Arc. Godard loves that film, and I understand why he loves it. And I had to learn basketball. Godard wanted to do a basketball scene very much.

Roussel defended her nude scenes in the film, telling Peary, "Mary is a virgin, but Mary is a woman too. For me, the decision was to show her in 1985 as an actual contemporary person. Maybe if we'd set the film in Biblical times, it could be shocking, but not now." She also recounted her experience of meeting Hail Mary picketers in Strasbourg: "There were five men, including a priest, and they hadn't seen the movie. I said to one man, 'I'll give you $3 to go inside,' but it was impossible to have a dialogue with them."

After Hail Mary, Roussel starred as Sister Virginia de Leyva in Devils of Monza (1987, original title: La monaca di Monza), a lavishly filmed Italian historical erotic-drama film directed by Luciano Odorisio, loosely based upon the oft-filmed true story of The Nun of Monza (a story made famous by the Alessandro Manzoni novel The Betrothed). Like Hail Mary, the film featured Roussel in scenes of full frontal nudity. Devils of Monza was released in some territories under the title Sacrilege and is considered part of the Nunsploitation subgenre. Tim Lucas of Video Watchdog described Devils of Monza as "an elegantly crafted little gem...exquisitely photographed by Romano Albani [with] one of Pino Donaggio's most beautiful scores," and singled out Roussel's performance for praise:

...what is most lingering about the picture is what lingers about the films Roussel made with Godard: the devotion it pays to her Renaissant loveliness, which somehow looks as much at home in a nun's habit as in the basketball uniform she sports in Hail Mary. There's a scene in Sacrilege where Sister Virginia, awakening to her sexuality under the smouldering, corruptive gaze of neighboring nobleman Giampaolo Osio (Alessandro Gassman), looks into a mirror and pulls her habit away from a cascade of long auburn hair. The effect is nearly breathtaking... What makes this moment so powerful is how, in the space of these few frames, Roussel's expression subtly morphs from timid curiosity to combined arousal and sorrow -- she tears her habit like a hymen -- and then from awe at her mirror's disclosure of her sensuality to a final expression that shows contempt for her vanity as she feels herself empowered by it. It is the moment of Sister Virginia's emergence as a complete, sexual being, body and soul, and by this point in the movie, we feel our heart breaking for her as it also pounds for her.

Roussel's other film appearances include Yves Boisset's Bleu comme l'enfer (1986), Robert van Ackeren's The Venus Trap (1988), Raúl Ruiz's Dark at Noon (1993), Éric Rochant's The Patriots (1994), and Laurent Bénégui's Au petit Marguery (1995).

Roussel also made appearances in French episodic television in the 1990s and 2000s.

Roussel's sister Anne is an actress; the two sisters both appeared in Pierre-Loup Rajot's Jeunes gens (1996).
