= The Nun of Monza =

Italian nun (1575–1650)

Marianna de Leyva y Marino
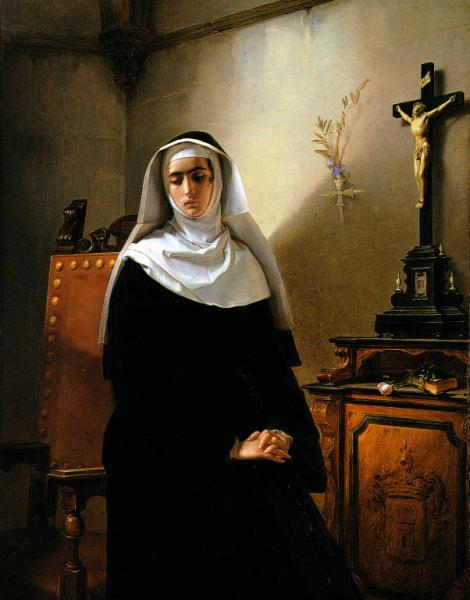
- La monaca di Monza, painting by Giuseppe Molteni
- Born: Marianna de Leyva y Marino; 4 December 1575; Milan, Duchy of Milan
- Died: 17 January 1650 (aged 74); Milan, Duchy of Milan
- Other names: The Nun of Monza, Virginia Maria
- Occupation: Nun
- Known for: Scandal in 1607; Character in the novel The Betrothed by Alessandro Manzoni
- Children: Alma Francesca Margherita

Sister Virginia Maria (born Marianna de Leyva y Marino; 4 December 1575 – 17 January 1650), best known as the Nun of Monza (in Italian: la monaca di Monza), was an Italian nun who gave birth to two children fathered by a local aristocrat and had connived in the murder of another nun to cover up the affair. This took place in Monza, in northern Italy, at the beginning of the 17th century.

Following this scandal, Sister Virginia became widely known as the Nun of Monza. Her life inspired one of the characters in Alessandro Manzoni's novel The Betrothed, which has also been dramatized several times. Mario Mazzucchelli's book The Nun of Monza (1963) presents a nonfictional account of Sister Virginia's life, drawing upon historical records including testimonies exacted by the Catholic Church during the investigation into Sister Virginia's crimes.

== Early life ==
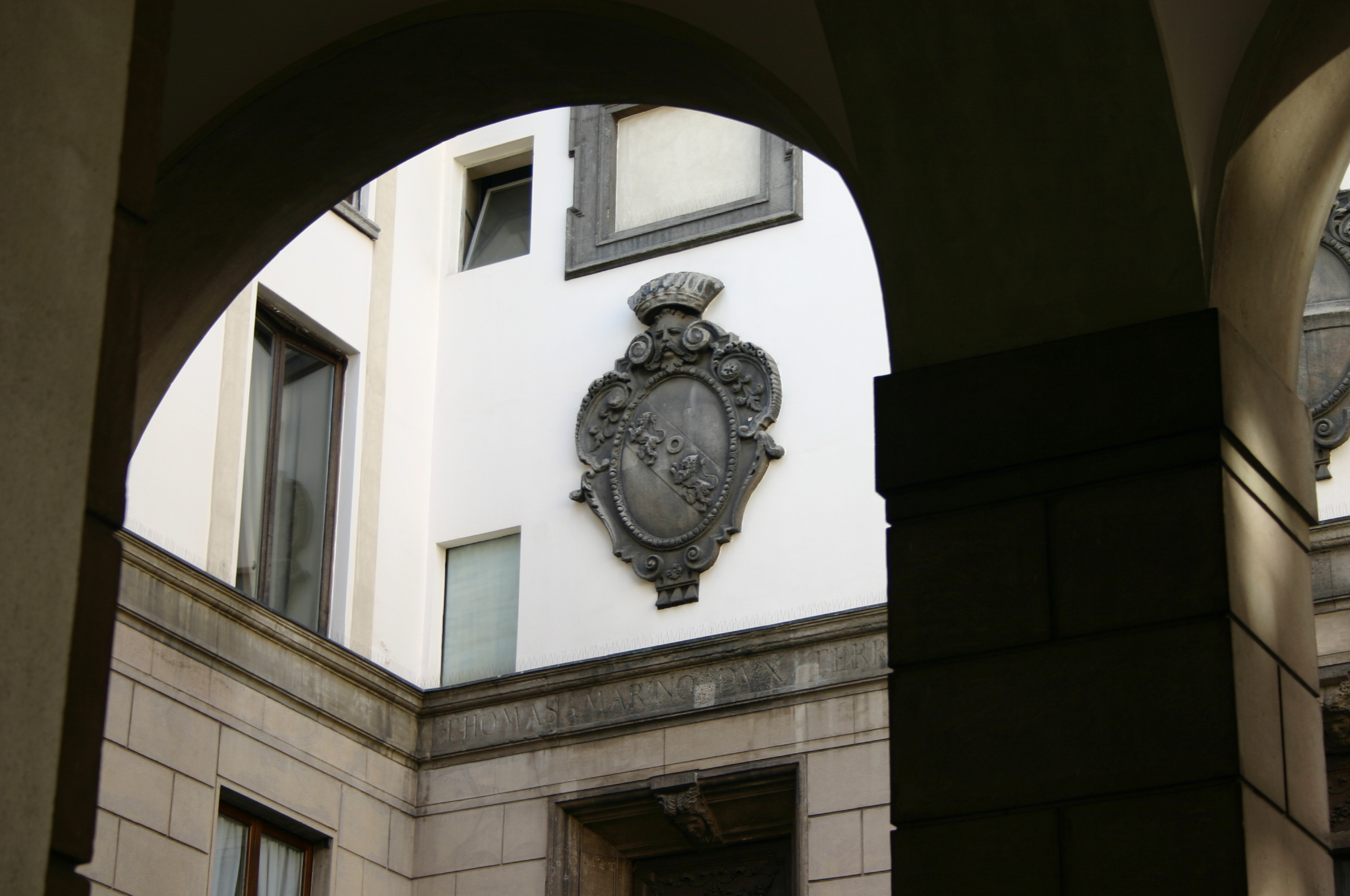
De Leyva family crest

Marianna de Leyva y Marino was born in Milan, at that time part of the Duchy of Milan under the dominion of the House of Habsburg-Lorraine, on 4 December 1575. She was the daughter of Martìno de Leyva and Virginia Maria Marino, widow of Ercole Pio Count of Sassuolo, and great granddaughter of Antonio de Leyva, who inherited the title to a County from Charles V. Virginia was the daughter and direct heir of one of the richest men in Milan, the banker Tommaso Marino.

Martìno had inherited the county of Monza as the great nephew of Antonio de Leyva, a Spaniard who became a notorious commander in Italy at the service of Charles V, who gave him the Fiefdom of Monza, with its related and substantial incomes. Martino was the second son of Luis de Leyva, Prince of Ascoli, who was an army captain and first Spanish governor of Milan. After the death of her mother Virginia in 1576, the infant Marianna was entered into a long trial for her inheritance, which was eventually not resolved in her favor. Her mother wanted to give half of her possessions to Marianna and the other half to her first son, Marco Pio, who was her child from an earlier marriage. Her will was contested by Marco Pio's sisters, who had been left nothing. Marianna lived with her aunts until 1588.

== Life as a nun ==
Marianna was a victim of forced monasticism. She was 13 years and 3 months old when her father forced her to become a nun in the monastery of Saint Margaret. The monastery was located in Spalto di Porta de’ Grandi, also known as Via Azzone Visconti. This monastery could only be accessed through a small street, which today is called Via della Signora. 15 March 1589 was the last time that don Martino de Leyva saw his daughter. Her father said he would leave her an inheritance of 6,000 lire, to be given to her by Giuseppe Limiato. The truth was that Limiato never received the money. Historical witnesses have confirmed she did receive income from the yearly revenues for being a nun.

On 26 August 1591, the archbishop witnessed four newly arrived sisters consecrate themselves: Sister Virginia Maria, Sister Benedetta Felice, Sister Teodora da Seveso and Sister Ottavia Caterina Ricci. On 26 September 1591, Marianna became Sister Virginia Maria. Before the scandal that made her notorious, contemporary writer Ripamonti described her as "modest", "respectful", and "obedient". He also records that she befriended everyone easily, and enjoyed reading as much as possible. She gained popularity in Monza in this period. On 20 May 1594, for example, the writer Bartolomeo Zucchi sent her a letter in which he praised her for her choice of becoming a nun.

=== Scandal ===
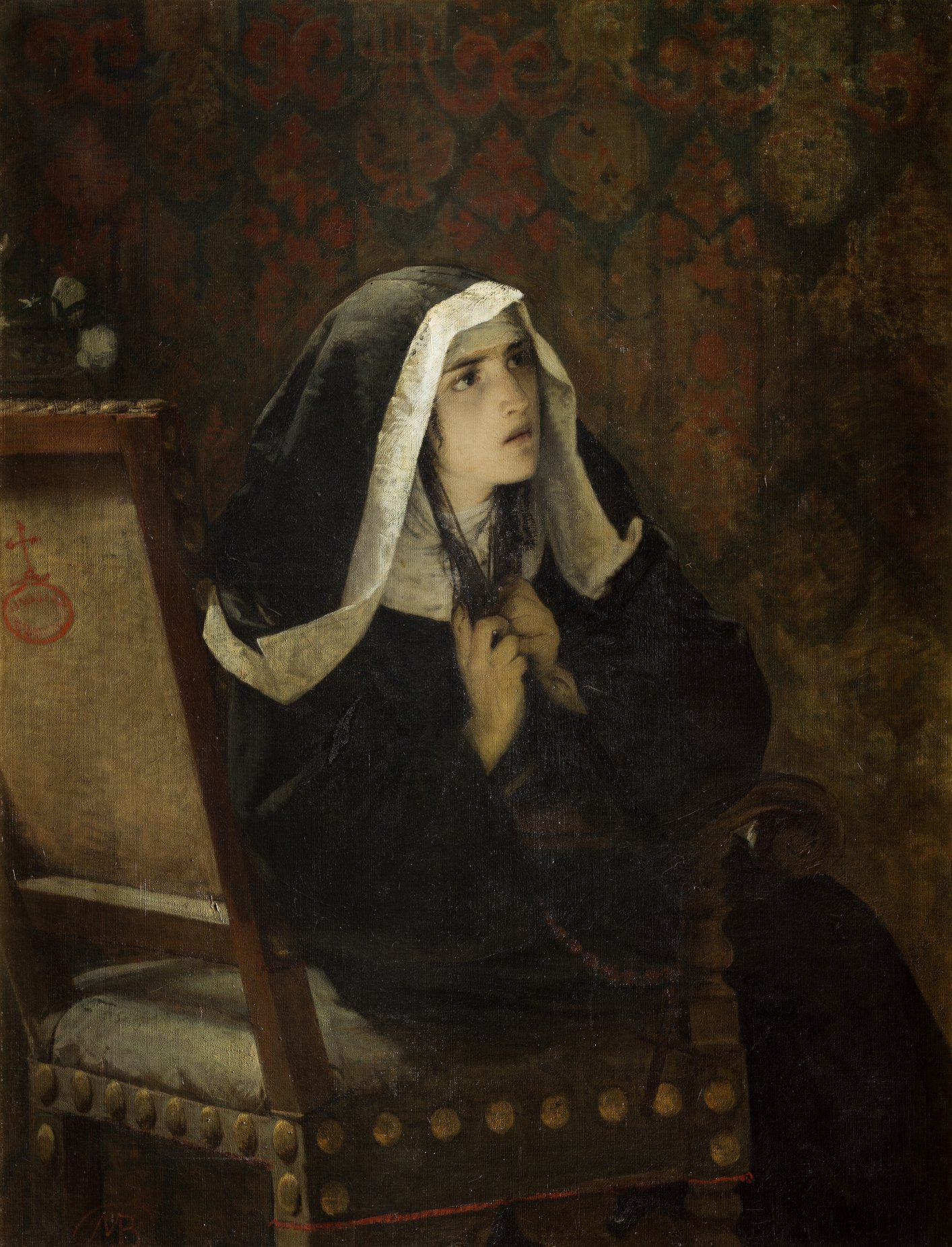
The Nun of Monza, painting by Mosè Bianchi

The scandal was caused by her love affair with the count Giovanni Paolo Osio, who had previously been accused of murder. In 1597 Marianna was a teacher at the convent's school for girls. During this period she met Osio, who lived in a house next to the monastery. Although she was a nun, Marianna was both rich and powerful; from a wealthy family, she also administered property revenues in Monza and was involved in administering justice. She started to exchange letters with Osio, delivered to his garden through a rope lowered from a window. The liaison was facilitated by the use of duplicated keys provided by a blacksmith. The meetings between them were frequent and were organized with the complicity of other nuns and a priest named Paolo Arrigone, a close friend of Osio.

In 1602, Marianna gave birth to an illegitimate stillborn baby. After this, the relationship with Osio temporarily ended. Despite this, after a while the affair restarted, although the lovers' meetings were less frequent. In autumn 1603, Sister Virginia got pregnant for the second time, and gave birth to a girl. The child was named Alma Francesca Margherita. Alma subsequently lived with her father, Count Osio, who legally acknowledged her as his illegitimate daughter two years later in 1605.

In the summer of 1606, one of the nuns at the convent threatened to expose the relationship. As a consequence of this threat, Osio killed her in order to avoid the spreading of the story. This murder apparently took place with the complicity of both Sister Virginia and other nuns. Sister Virginia threatened all the nuns complicit in the murder that they would suffer the same fate if they revealed the crime. The murder remained secret because outsiders were told that the murdered lay sister had run off. In the autumn of 1606, however, rumors about the activities at the convent became more frequent. The blacksmith who had counterfeited the keys was also killed by Osio. These facts came to the ears of the governor of Milan. On Carnival day of 1607 Osio was arrested and imprisoned in Pavia. He subsequently escaped and was later given a death sentence in absentia. He was eventually murdered by an alleged friend.

=== Trial ===
When the Archbishop Federico Borromeo came to know about the scandal, he ordered a canonical trial of the nun. The trial started on 27 November 1607, and she was interrogated by Vicar Gerolamo Saracino. Marianna defended herself by claiming loss of free-will, asserting that diabolic forces had exercised on her an irresistible impulse. From 19 November until 27 March 1608, the interrogation of the priest Paolo Arrigone took place. On 22 May 1608, the interrogation restarted again and this time torture was used.

On 14 June, Sister Virginia was interrogated. She confirmed, under physical torment, the accusations against Arrigone. Even his doorman and his wife were exposed to torture (in the sense of being shown the instruments of torture) to confirm the accusations against him. In the verdict, issued on 18 October 1608, Sister Virginia was sentenced to be walled-in for 13 years in the monastery of Santa Valeria. After surviving this period of incarceration, she was released in 1622. She lived at the monastery until her death in 1650.

== In literature ==
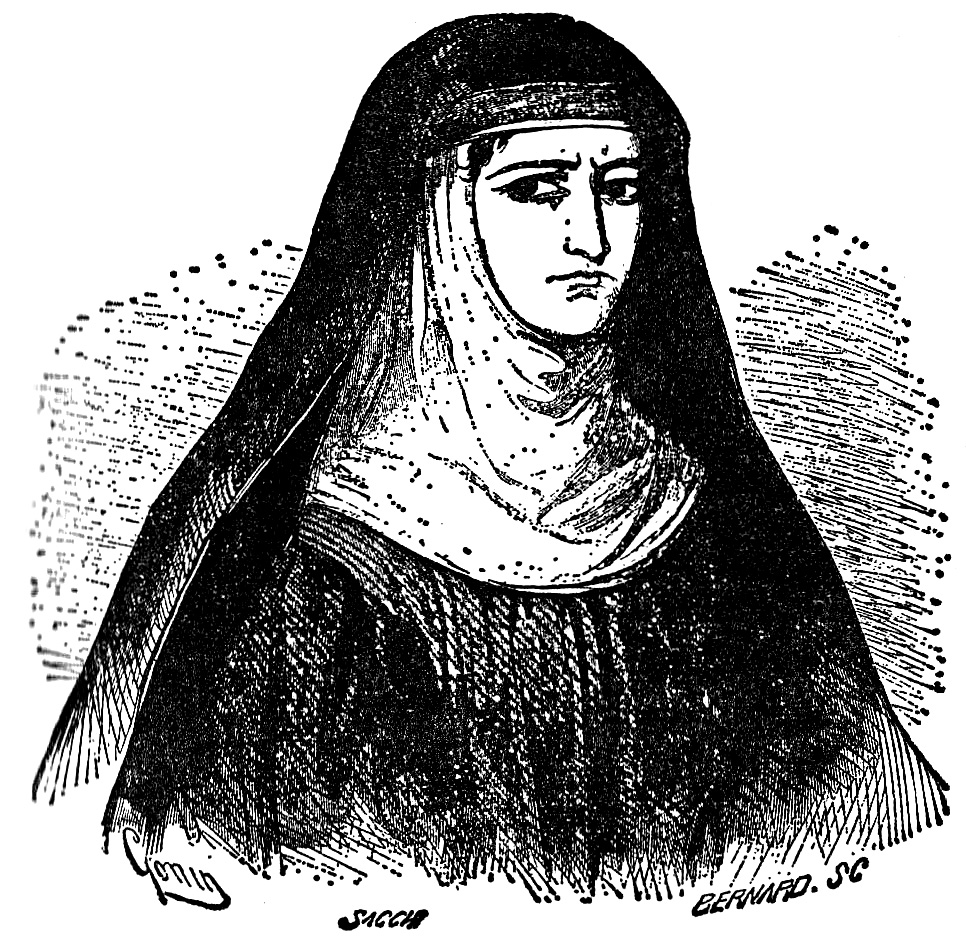
The Nun of Monza, illustration to the novel by Francesco Gonin

Her continued renown is mostly credited to the novel The Betrothed (in Italian: I promessi sposi, 1827), generally ranked among the masterpieces of world literature. She appears in Chapters IX, X, XVIII, XX, and XXVII under the name "Gertrude". Her portrait is one of the longest and most detailed of the whole novel; it deals with her previous life, her difficult relationship with her family, her initial rejection for religious life, and the strength and the cruelty of her father which finally forced her to live as a nun. It is a romanticized account, but based on Virginia de Leyva's character. It is described through a "flashbacks" technique, along with particular combinations of nouns and adjectives which suggest a hidden anguished secret in the nun's previous life.

Through her back-story, it is showed that her religious vows did not stop her physical urges, and she had a relationship with an evil aristocrat, Egidio, who pushed her to become his accomplice in the murder of a nun: this is her tormenting secret. The principal female characters, Agnese and Lucia, meet Gertrude (The Nun of Monza) while escaping from the villain Don Rodrigo. They shelter in her convent, looking for hospitality. Gertrude becomes close to Lucia. Egidio asks her to help him to kidnap Lucia on behalf of the bandit Innominato, who is working for Rodrigo. She at first refuses, then gives in, and later confesses her crimes. Her decision is difficult for her, emphasizing Manzoni's view of her as a weak tool of evil, unable to resist threats and temptations, but basically not cruel. Later in the novel, at the end of Chapter 37, Lucia learns of Gertrude's repentance, confession of guilt, and consequent sentence. The preliminary novel of The Betrothed, entitled "Fermo and Lucia", dedicated six chapters to the story of the nun from Monza, which Manzoni then reduced to only two. the text described the passion for Egidio and the murder of his sister.

In a letter addressed to his friend Cesare Cantù, Manzoni states that he is unable to identify the nun of Monza because he is not in possession of documentation from the Borromeo household. He therefore chooses as her name that of Gertrude referring to Saint Gertrude of Nivelles about whom he had inquired for the writing of the tragedy of Adelchi. Like the nun of Monza, Gertrude is an abbess, had a saint life, and in the 16th century she is depicted in a painting chasing away the rats that are the main vehicles carrying the plague.

== In film ==
The life of the Nun of Monza has been popularized in many films, most of which are examples of the nunsploitation subgenre.

- La monaca di Monza, a 1962 Italian historical drama directed by Carmine Gallone, starring Giovanna Ralli.
- Il monaco di Monza (The Monk of Monza), a 1962 Italian comedy film directed by Sergio Corbucci, starring Totò, and Moira Orfei as Sister Virginia.
- The Lady of Monza (also known as The Awful Story of the Nun of Monza), a 1969 Italian historical drama directed by Eriprando Visconti, starring Anne Heywood.
- The True Story of the Nun of Monza (in Italian: La vera storia della monaca di Monza), a 1980 Italian-French costume drama directed by Bruno Mattei, starring Zora Kerova.
- Devils of Monza (also known as La Monaca di Monza and Sacrilege), a 1987 Italian erotic drama directed by Luciano Odorisio, starring Myriem Roussel.
- Virginia, la monaca di Monza, a 2004 Italian television movie directed by Alberto Sironi, starring Giovanna Mezzogiorno.
- Sometimes the Good Kill, a 2017 film about murders at an abbey directed by Philippe Gagnon and starring Susie Abromeit.

== Bibliography ==
- Leyva, Virginia Maria de, item of the Italian Biographical Dictionary "Dizionario Biografico degli Italiani", Treccani, M.C. Giannini
- Mario Mazzucchelli, The Nun of Monza, 1963
- Luigi Zerbi, La Monaca di Monza, MERAVIGLI, 2007
