= Lorenzo de Monacis =

Lorenzo de Monacis was a diplomat serving the Republic of Venice. He was also an influential historian whose chronicles were relied upon by Flavio Biondo and Marcantonio Sabellico.

== Diplomatic career ==
In 1386 Lorenzo de Monacis accompanied Venetian diplomat Pantaleone Barbo to Hungary representing Venice's interests during a crisis involving the succession to the Hungarian throne. The diplomatic mission was successful as described in a report by de Monacis to the Venetian government. During the mission, de Monacis wrote a poem defending Mary, Queen of Hungary and Elizabeth of Bosnia, who were accused of the murder of Charles III of Naples.

In 1389, de Monacis accompanied Barbo again on another diplomatic mission to Hungary when they fell victims to robbery. The two diplomats, having lost all their personal belongings during the incident, received 60 gold ducats as compensation awarded to them by the Great Council of Venice. De Monacis returned to Hungary on another mission in 1390.

== Chancellor of Crete ==
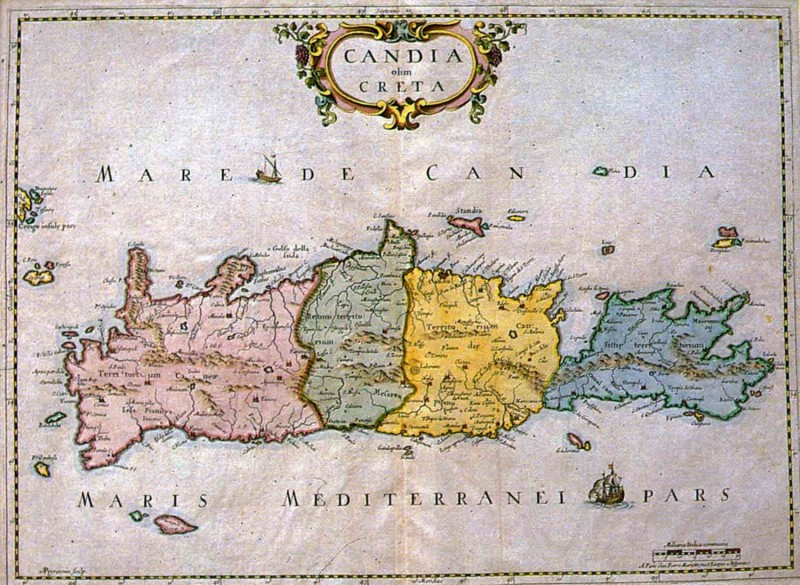
Map showing the four territoria of Crete.

In 1389, de Monacis was elected Chancellor of Crete, which under Venetian rule was called the Kingdom of Candia. He held this position until his death. During that time he supervised the agreement between Venice and Mary of Enghien, inheritor of Argos-Nafplion, which saw the sale of the two cities to Venice for 500 ducats. In 1395, he was sent to France along with Giovanni Alberto, a fellow diplomat, to settle a trade dispute through diplomacy.

== Published works ==
De Monacis, alongside Niccolò Sagundino and Antonio Vinciguerra, published books to promote the interest of Venice and justify its territorial expansion. De Monacis drew on humanist principles to defend the foreign policy of Venice. In particular, de Monacis focused on the early history of Venice. He claimed that Venice had not been corrupted by luxury and that Venice had a divine mission of defending liberty. Marcantonio Sabellico later relied on these publications for his history of Venice.

In the chronicle Chronicon de rebus Venetis ab U.C. ad annum 1354 de Monacis described the stench that the urban area of Venice emitted before a plague epidemic took hold of the city. The plague reached Venice in January 1348. At the same time Venice was hit by a series of earthquakes. The city of Venice was densely populated and by March the epidemic had reached epic proportions. According to de Monacis, "squares, tombs, and all the holy places were crammed with corpses... it became necessary to take the bodies away at public expense on special ships, called pontoons, which rowed through the city, dragging the corpses from the abandoned houses." De Monacis conceded that "the plague cut down women and men, old and young in equal measures. Once it struck a house, none left alive."

In 1421 de Monacis commemorated the thousand-year anniversary of founding of Venice with the treatise Oratio, dedicating it to Doge Tommaso Mocenigo.

Between 1421 and 1428 de Monacis authored a laudatory account of Venice's early history under the title De gestis, moribus et nobilitate civitatis Venetiarum. His narrative on the Siege of Constantinople (1204) assessed non-Venetian sources, such as the eye-witness report by Nicetas Choniates. This analysis became a main source for Historiarum ab inclinatione Romanorum imperii decades, written by the historian Flavio Biondo between 1439 and 1444. The complete text of De Monaci's chronicle exists only in the very rare edition of Venice, 1758. The parts on Ezzelino III da Romano were prepared for publication by Felice Osio in the early seventeenth century and published by Ludovico Antonio Muratori in Rerum Italicarum scriptores, vol. VIII.

In 1425 de Monacis published an oration, to defend the war Doge Francesco Foscari waged against the Visconti of Milan. De Monacis cast Venice as defender of Christian territories against the Turks.
