= Ottone and Acerbo Morena =

Italian chroniclers of the 12th century

Ottone and his son Acerbo Morena (died 1167) of Lodi were Italian chroniclers who wrote in Latin a history of the campaigns of Frederick Barbarossa in Lombardy from 1154 to 1168, known as the Historia rerum Laudensium, which was begun by Ottone. Both were supporters of the emperor and opponents of Milan. Acerbo died in the outbreak of plague that attended the disorders when Frederick Barbarossa's army took possession of Rome in July 1167. The Morenas were among the first lay chroniclers of medieval Italy; the Enciclopedia Italiana described their work as the principal source for Lombard history of the period.

== Works ==
- Felice Osio, ed. (1629). Historia rerum Laudensium tempore Federici Aenobarbi Caesaris (in Latin). Venice: Marco Ginammi.
