= Renato Marotta =

Italian actor and director

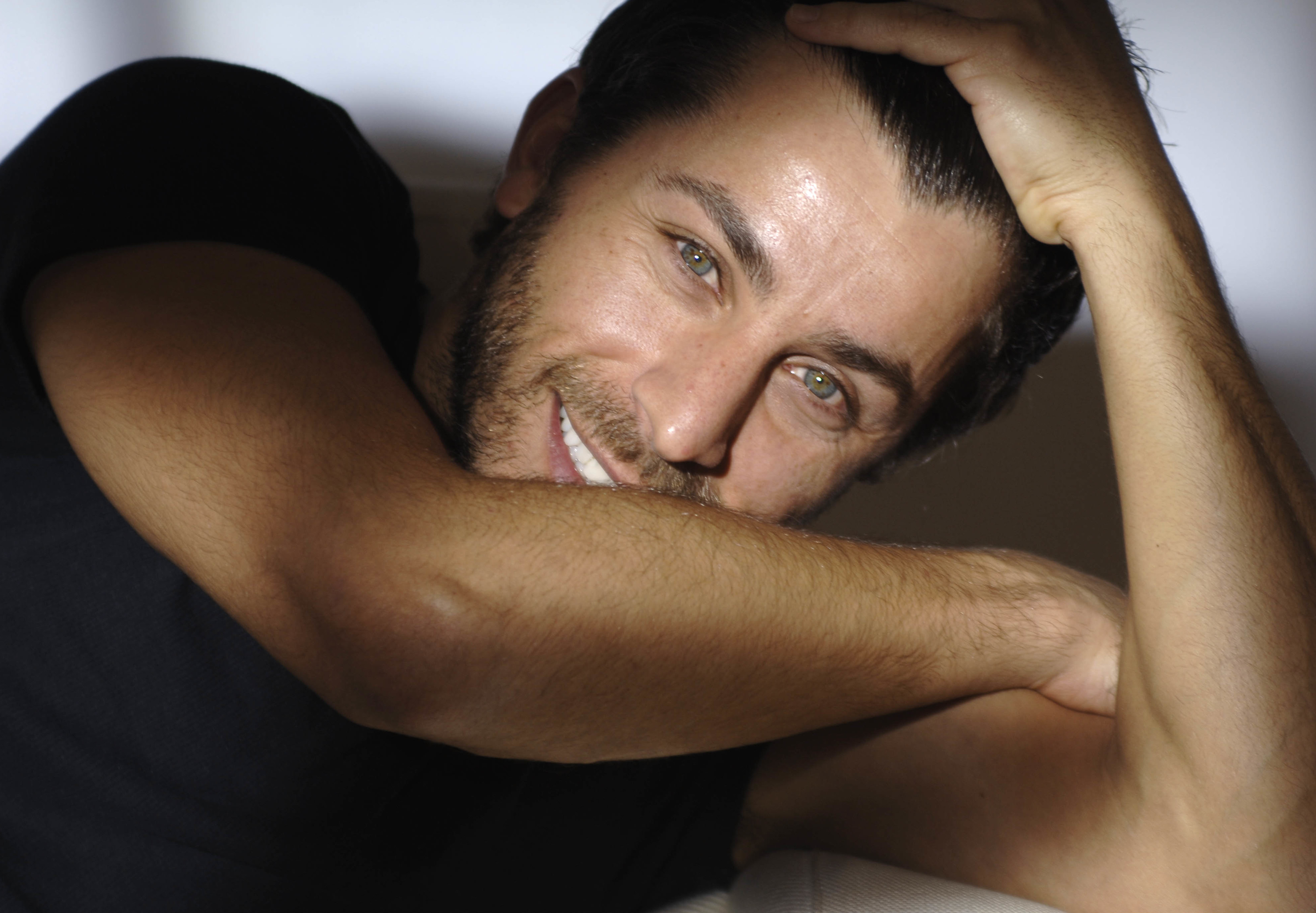
Renato Marotta

Renato Marotta (born 16 November 1974 in Salerno) is an Italian actor and director.
