= Felice Osio =

Italian scholar (1587–1631)

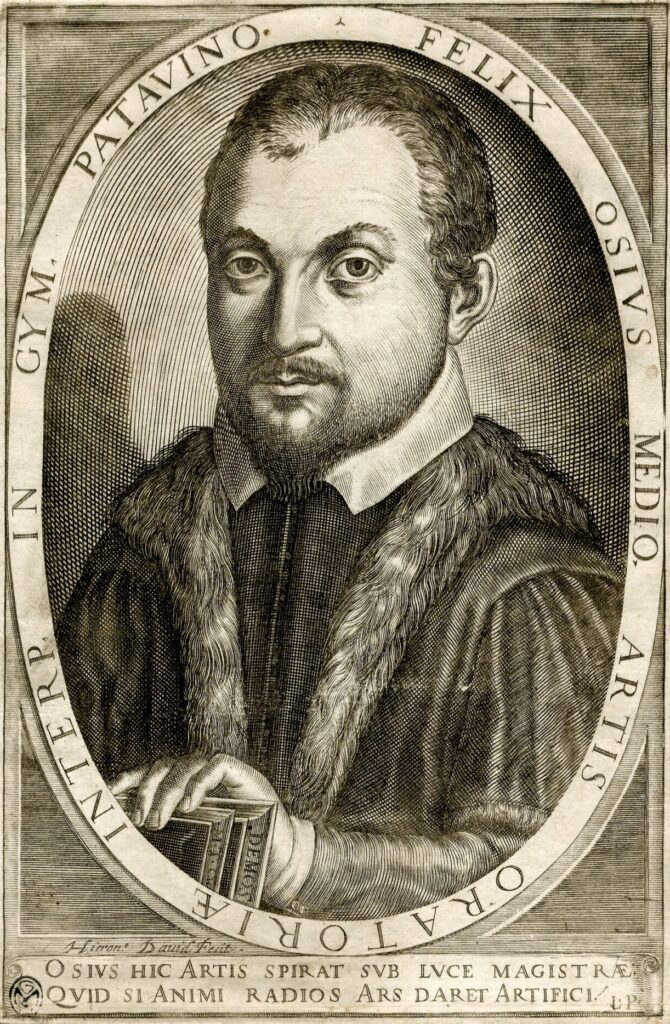
- Born: July 12, 1587; Milan, Duchy of Milan
- Died: 29 July 1631 (aged 44); Padua, Republic of Venice
- Occupations: Catholic priest, philologist, university teacher, medievalist
- Known for: Editio princeps of the works of Albertino Mussato
- Family: Osio

Academic background
- Education: Almo Collegio Borromeo

Academic work
- Discipline: Philology, Medieval studies
- Institutions: Swiss seminary; University of Padua
- Influenced: Ludovico Antonio Muratori

Felice Osio (Latin: Foelix Osius, Felix Hosius; 12 July 1587 – 29 July 1631), was an Italian cleric, scholar, and writer.

== Biography ==
Felice Osio was born in Milan in 1587 into an ancient noble family that, according to Giacomo Filippo Tomasini, claimed to descend from Osius, high priest of the temple of Delphi.

Having completed his studies with some acclaim, he studied philosophy and theology at the Borromeo College, where he received his doctorate at the age of 21. He then embraced holy orders, and, having chosen to become a teacher, lectured on humanities at the Swiss seminary in Milan, then at Bergamo.

In 1621 he was appointed to the chair of rhetoric at the University of Padua. The orations he gave were considered brilliant occasions and were much applauded. Osio was equally gifted in writing in verse; and numerous collections offer his compositions.

History was Osio's primary interest. He was the first to conceive the project, subsequently carried out by Muratori, of forming a great collection of source documents on the medieval history of Italy. As a student in Milan, Osio had worked for Cardinal Federico Borromeo on the foundation of the Biblioteca Ambrosiana and after his appointment at the University of Padua he urged the Venetian Senate to establish a library in support of the university. The new library was established in 1629, and Osio was appointed the first librarian. In 1630, Padua was struck by the plague. Osio remained working in the city but died on 29 July 1631 at the age of forty-four. His remains were laid to rest, without ceremony, in the grounds of the Jesuit church, then still under construction.

== Works ==
Osio left, in manuscript, Poetry, Polemics, Panegyrics, etc. He published a list of his Discourses, which Tomasini included in his Elogia viror. litter. illustrium, and Argelati, in the Bibl. scriptor. Mediolan. He was unable to complete his study on the works of Albertino Mussato; and this was, says Tiraboschi, a disappointment for lovers of the historical genre, for he had such a facility for writing, and was so fond of digressions, that he would have filled a great number of folio volumes with his notes. Osio's Notes on the History of Mussato have been collected and published in the editio princeps of Mussato's works. His commentary on the History or Chronicle of Lodi, by Ottone and Acerbo Morena, Venice, 1639, appeared in volume I of the Scriptor. Brunsvic.; in volume II of the Thesaur. antiquitat. Italiæ, and in volume VI of the Rerum italicarum scriptores; and his commentary on the History of the March of Treviso, features in volume VIII of Muratori's Collection. His notes on the thirteenth book of Lorenzo de Monacis' Chronicon de rebus Venetis were republished by Muratori in volume VIII of Rerum Italicarum scriptores. In addition to the works cited, one can consult the Historia gymnasii Patavini, I, 357–9, on Osio. His engraved portrait can be found in the Elogia of Tomasini.

== Sources ==
- Tomasini, Giacomo Filippo (1644). "Felix Osius". Elogia virorum literis & sapientia illustrium ad viuum expressis imaginibus exornata (in Latin). Padua: ex typographia Sebastiani Sardi. pp. 244–254.
- Picinelli, Filippo (1670). Ateneo dei letterati milanesi. Milan: Vigone. pp. 186–8.
- Comneno Papadopoli, Niccolò (1726). "Felix Osius". Historia Gymnasii Patavini (in Latin). Venice: apud Sebastianum Coleti. pp. 357–359.
- Argelati, Filippo (1745). "Hosius Felix". Bibliotheca scriptorum Mediolanensium (in Latin). Vol. 1/2. Milan: in Aedibus Palatinis. pp. 726–729.
- Weiss, Charles (1860). "Osio, Félix". In Michaud, Louis-Gabriel (ed.). Biographie universelle ancienne et moderne (in French). Vol. 31. Paris: Desplaces. p. 444.
- Osio, Felice (1873). Ricordi inediti di Felice Osio umanista nello studio di Padova intorno al modo di formare una pubblica biblioteca (in Italian). Venice: Tipografia Gaspari.
