= Loggia degli Osii =

Historical building in Milan, Italy

Coordinates: 45.4645°N 9.18758°E

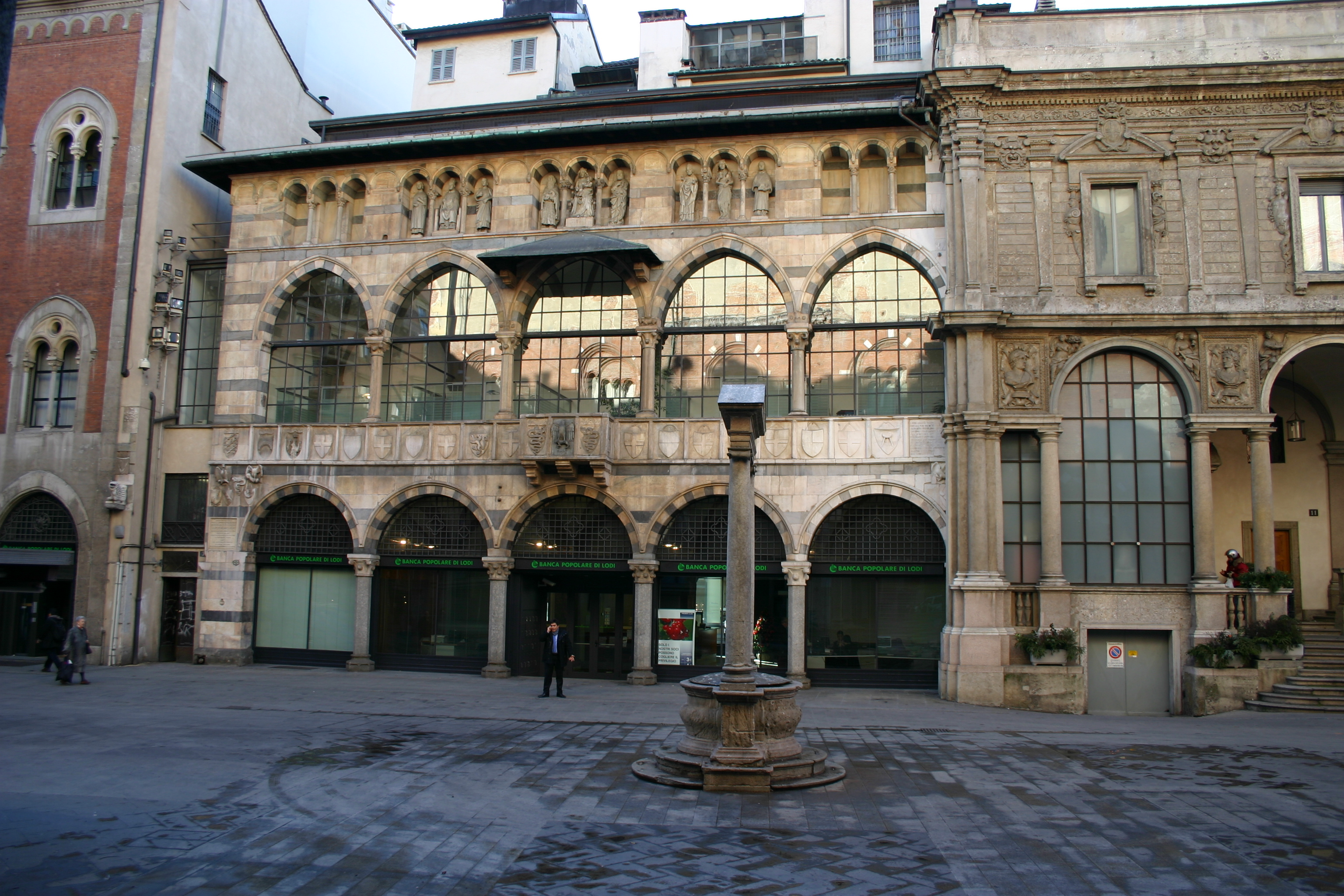
Loggia degli Osii.

The Loggia degli Osii is a Gothic-style civic building of Milan, Italy. It is located in Piazza Mercanti, a central city square of Milan that used to be its centre in the Middle Ages.

== History ==
Construction took place between 1316 and 1321, commissioned by Matteo I Visconti, lord of Milan, who wanted a series of porticoes adjacent to the Palazzo della Ragione to house the judicial and notary activities of the city. The name derives from that of the Osio family, who held some palaces in the area before its construction. The Loggia was designed by Scoto da San Gimignano.

Sentences and edicts were proclaimed by the Milanese judges from the Loggia's balcony (known as parlera), decorated with an eagle holding a prey, symbol of justice.

== Description ==
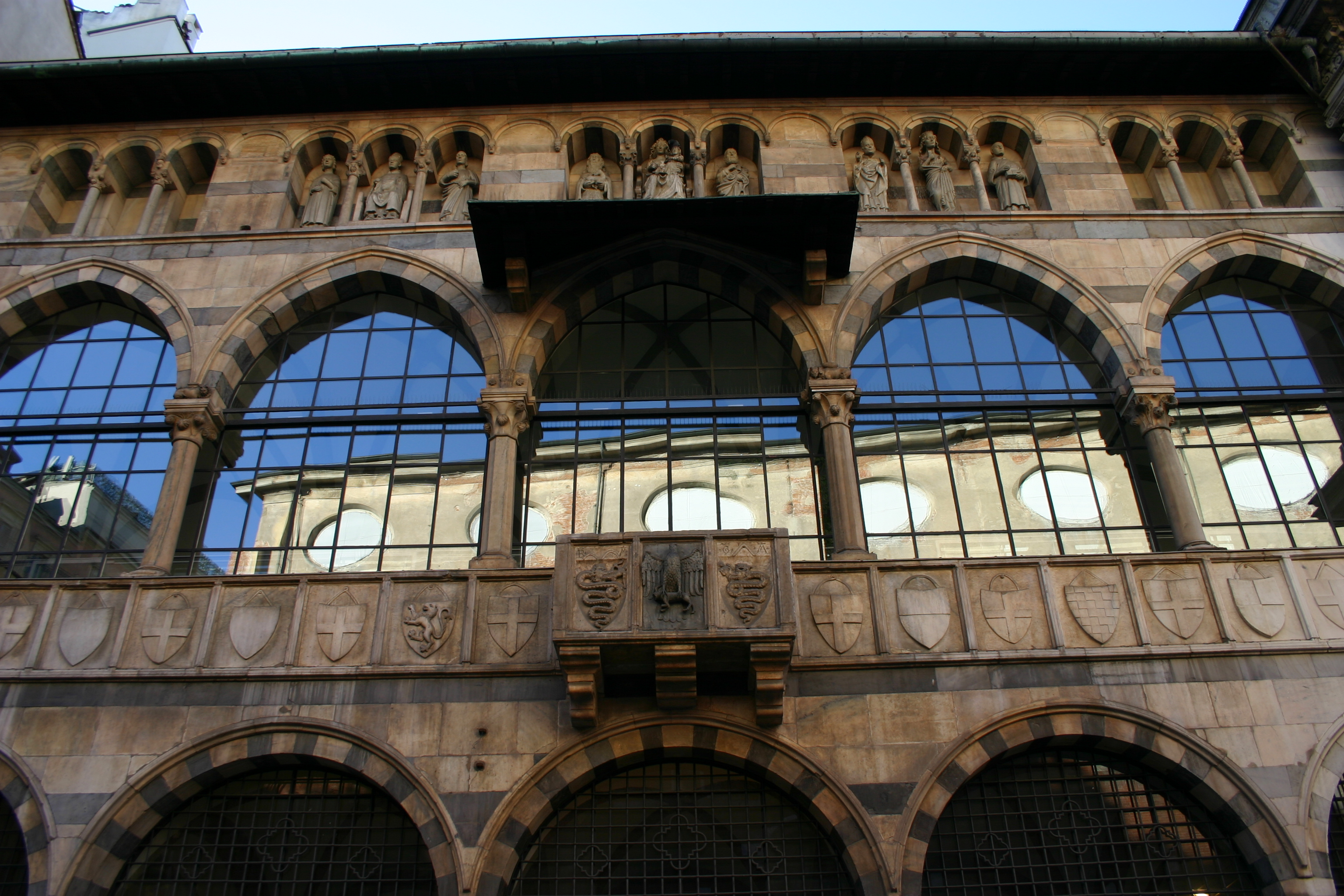
Center of second floor of façade with parlera balcony with central eagle sculpture and flanking serpents (heraldic symbol of the Visconti)

The edifice has a Gothic style portico and loggia in the façade; not usual for the Milanese Gothic structures is the white and black marble decoration: this, more common in Genoa at the time, is perhaps a homage to Matteo Visconti's wife, Valentina Doria.

The two loggias are surmounted by a series of triple mullioned windows, housing statues. These were realized by Ugo da Campione and his son Giovanni, by other masters from Campione d'Italia and Tuscany, in the 14th century.

== Sources ==
- Lavagnino, E. (1936). Storia dell'arte medioevale italiana (in Italian). Turin.
