= Messina tram depot =

Coordinates: 45°29′9.45″N 9°10′21.16″E

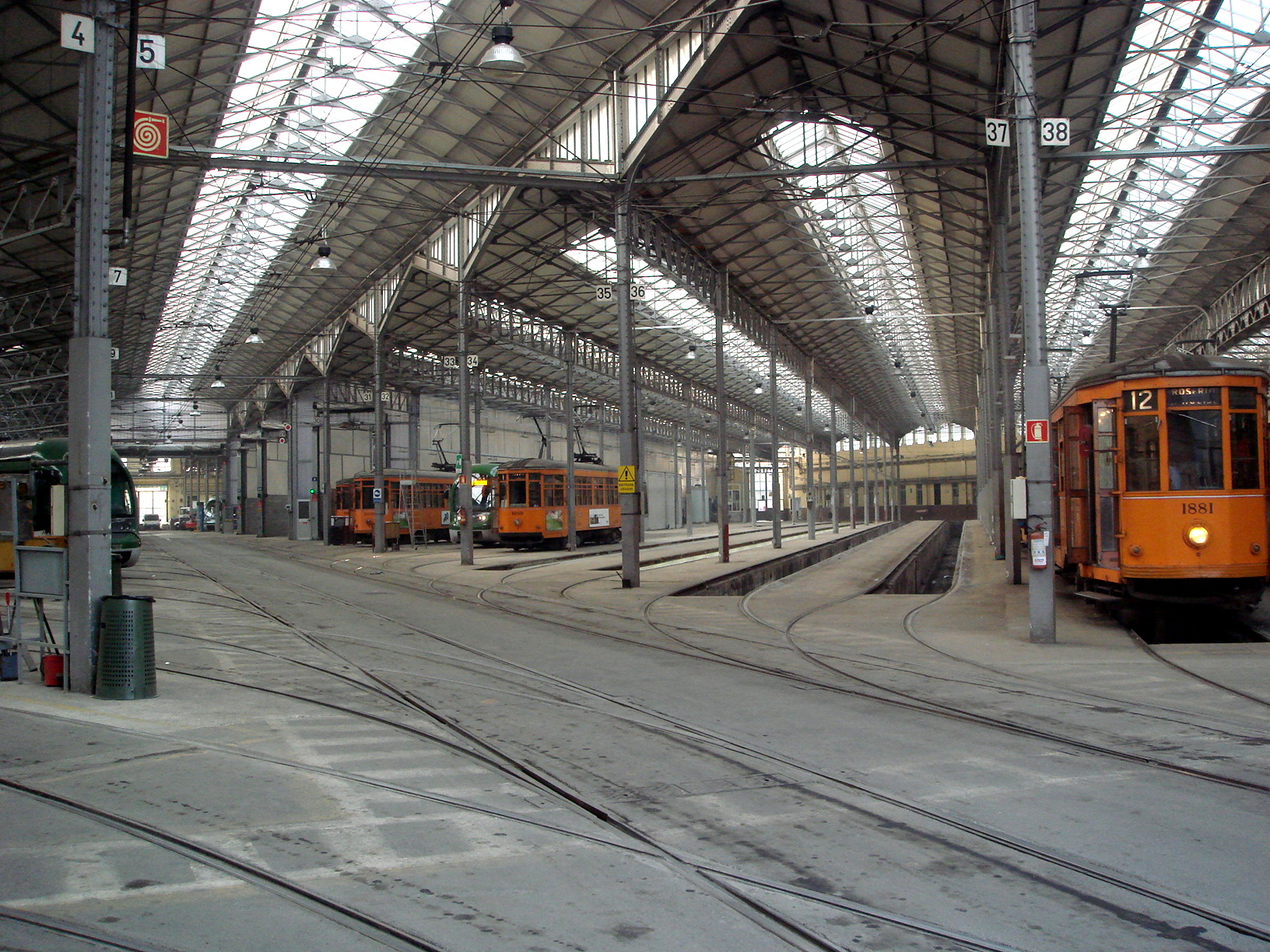
Interior of the Messina tram depot

The Messina tram depot (in Italian: Deposito tranviario Messina) is the largest tram depot in Milan, Italy, and one of the largest in the world. It is located at street number 41 of Via Messina, close to the Monumentale cemetery. The building of the depot, which dates back to 1912, is a prominent example of early 20th century Milanese industrial architecture, and one of the most important examples of cast-iron architecture in Italy. The depot is still in use by Azienda Trasporti Milanesi (ATM) public transport company. Due to its historical and architectural relevance, ATM occasionally opens the depot to visitors.

The main structure of the building is composed of cast-iron piers surmounted by iron trusses; the roof comprises both glass panes and cotto tiles. The overall covered area is 29,062 m^{2} (312,820 sq ft). It houses about 150 trams as well as other vehicles devoted to railway maintenance and other support tasks.

== See also ==
- Trams in Milan
- Transport in Milan
