= Hail Mary (film) =

1985 French drama flm by Jean-Luc Godard

- Theatrical release poster
- Directed by: Jean-Luc Godard
- Written by: Jean-Luc Godard
- Produced by: Jean-Luc Godard; Alain Sarde; Jean Dumur; Jeremy Isaacs
- Starring: Myriem Roussel; Thierry Rode; Philippe Lacoste; Manon Andersen; Malachi Jara Kohan; Juliette Binoche
- Cinematography: Jacques Firmann; Jean-Bernard Menoud
- Edited by: Anne-Marie Miéville
- Music by: Antonín Dvořák; John Coltrane; Johann Sebastian Bach
- Distributed by: Gaumont Distribution
- Release date: 23 January 1985
- Running time: 109 minutes (Mieville's short: 29 minutes +Godard's feature: 80 minutes)
- Country: France
- Language: French

Hail Mary (French: Je vous salue, Marie) is a 1985 French avant-garde drama film written and directed by Jean-Luc Godard. The film is a modern retelling of the story of the virgin birth of Jesus. It was entered into the 35th Berlin International Film Festival. Most screenings are preceded by the short film The Book of Mary by Anne-Marie Miéville, as initially stipulated by the filmmakers.

== Plot ==
=== The Book of Mary ===
The film tells the story of a traumatic experience by 11-year-old Marie of her parents' separation. She takes refuge in books, music and dance.

=== Hail Mary ===
Marie is a young student in Switzerland, working part-time at her father’s gas station and playing for a local basketball team. She is in a committed yet entirely chaste relationship with Joseph, an uneducated taxi driver who left school at age twelve. Despite advances from another young woman, Juliette, Joseph remains devoted to Marie, respecting her refusal to sleep with him.

Their lives are upended by the arrival of a mysterious stranger known as Uncle Gabriel, who arrives via jet plane accompanied by a young girl acting as his secretary. Gabriel delivers a shocking revelation: Marie will become pregnant while remaining a virgin. Overwhelmed by confusion and fear, Marie struggles to comprehend the news, while Joseph responds with bitter skepticism, accusing her of infidelity. Gabriel aggressively—and with growing volatility—demands that Joseph accept the miraculous nature of the pregnancy. Meanwhile, Marie undergoes a intense inner transformation, wrestling with divine will through angry, quiet meditations set against striking imagery of nature—sun, moon, drifting clouds, flowing water, and blooming flowers.

Running parallel to Marie’s story is that of Eva, a college student involved in a passionate affair with her professor. The professor promotes a theory that life on Earth was engineered by an extraterrestrial intelligence. In contrast to Marie’s refusal of physical intimacy, Eva surrenders fully to her desire. Ultimately, the professor abandons Eva to return to his family in the east, leaving her heartbroken and alone.

Guided by Gabriel, Marie teaches Joseph a deeper form of intimacy—how to "touch" her without physical touch. Accepting his role, Joseph vows to act as her constant shadow, prompting Marie to reflect on the nature of men as shadows of the divine. Overcoming her internal struggle, Marie yields to the supernatural process within her. She and Joseph marry, and she gives birth to a son. They raise the boy together until he reaches young adulthood and leaves home to pursue "his father's business." Left on her own once more, Marie embarks on a final personal journey, exploring her own sexuality to fully unify her body, mind, and spirit.

== Cast ==
in Book of Mary

- Rebecca Hampton as Marie
- Bruno Cremer as the Father (Le Père)
- Aurore Clément as the Mother (La Mère)

In Hail Mary

- Myriem Roussel as Marie
- Thierry Rode as Joseph
- Philippe Lacoste as L'ange Gabriel
- Manon Andersen as La petite fille
- Juliette Binoche as Juliette
- Anne Gautier as Eva

== Background ==
The point of departure for the film was a book by Françoise Dolto, the popular French pediatrician and psychoanalyst, called L'Évangile au risque de la psychanalyse.

== Release ==
The film was first released in France on 23 January 1985. It was entered into the 35th Berlin International Film Festival. All screenings in its initial theatrical distribution were accompanied by the short film The Book of Mary (French: Le livre de Marie) by Godard's longtime companion and collaborator Anne-Marie Miéville.

The film received home media release from the Cohen Media. The Blu-ray package follows this tradition and places The Book of Mary right before Hail Mary.

== Reception ==
Hail Mary's religious themes and scenes of full frontal nudity offended some Christians. Pope John Paul II criticized the film saying that it "deeply wounds the religious sentiments of believers." Protesters showed up at some theaters on opening night, and its premiere screening at the Sydney Film Festival was disrupted by protestors and a bomb threat that caused the theatre to be evacuated. The film had only 353,877 admissions in French movie theaters. It was banned in Argentina and Brazil (where the movie was banned until 1988).

Hail Mary received mixed reviews, including one in the New York Times that characterized the film as "not especially provocative or entertaining", but also called it "an utterly serious attempt to examine the nature of relations between women and men and the possibility of profound friendships not based on sex. It's also about the demands of faith, which, in this time of cynicism, may be the most truly controversial aspect of the movie." Many other serious critics were more favourable: Time Out said "Composed like a brilliant mosaic, Godard's film gives fresh meaning to everyday images; makes us listen to Dvořák with renewed appreciation; and shows the female nude as though never filmed before." Channel 4 Film's critic wrote "The Virgin Birth is presented as a reality - the mystery for Godard being womanhood and birth in general. This he explores through stunning images of nature and the nude figure of his heroine - the latter photographed chastely without voyeurism or sexism, after certain classic paintings." Filmmaker John Waters wrote a highly favorable review that was included in his book Crackpot. In contrast, writer and director James Gunn claims it is his least favorite film.

At the Cannes Film Festival, Noël Godin, disappointed that Godard, in his opinion, made a religious film, threw a shaving cream pie into Godard's face, making international news. Under heavy criticism, Godard attempted to withdraw the film from Italy, but his distributor was unable to do so. He also claimed that the film is not about the Virgin Mary, but about "a young woman named Mary who, at a certain moment in her life, finds herself part of an exceptional event that she would never have wished for herself." Despite the initial heavy criticism, the film has also been praised for its beautiful cinematography.

Hail Mary currently holds a 75% rating on Rotten Tomatoes based on 12 reviews.
