= The Monk of Monza =

- Directed by: Sergio Corbucci
- Written by: Bruno Corbucci; Giovanni Grimaldi
- Starring: Totò; Erminio Macario; Nino Taranto
- Cinematography: Enzo Barboni
- Music by: Armando Trovajoli
- Release date: 1963
- Running time: 101 minutes
- Country: Italy
- Language: Italian

The Monk of Monza (Italian: Il monaco di Monza) is a 1963 Italian comedy film directed by Sergio Corbucci. It parodies the story of the Nun of Monza, as depicted in Alessandro Manzoni's novel The Betrothed.

== Plot ==
Monza, 1630, a period of Spanish rule. Pasquale Cicciacalda, a humble shoemaker native of Casoria, widower of the midwife Provvidenza, can not maintain their 12 children (6 pairs of twins) and therefore devises a cunning ploy. Disguised himself and his children as monks, vague with them pretending to be poor monks, asking food and charity.

== Cast ==
- Totò as Friar Pasquale da Casoria (Pasquale Cicciacalda)
- Erminio Macario as Friar Mamozio
- Nino Taranto as Don Egidio, Marquis de Lattanziis
- Lisa Gastoni as Fiorenza, Marquise del Giglio
- Moira Orfei as Sister Virginia
- Giacomo Furia as Cecco
- Fiorenzo Fiorentini as Smilzo
- Adriano Celentano as Adriano
- Don Backy as the false friar
- Dany París as Fiorenza's waitress
- Mario Castellani as the nobleman with two right shoes
- Carlo Delle Piane as the innkeeper
- Franco Ressel as the official
