= The Lady of Monza =

- Directed by: Eriprando Visconti
- Written by: Eriprando Visconti; Gian Piero Bona
- Cinematography: Luigi Kuveiller
- Music by: Ennio Morricone
- Release date: 26 February 1969
- Language: Italian

The Lady of Monza (Italian: La monaca di Monza, also known as The Awful Story of the Nun of Monza and The Nun of Monza) is a 1969 Italian historical drama film directed by Eriprando Visconti. It is loosely based on the real life events of Marianna de Leyva, better known as "The Nun of Monza", whose story was made famous by Alessandro Manzoni's novel The Betrothed.

== Premise ==
A nun is raped and then falls in love with her attacker. She is tortured and burned alive.

== Cast ==
- Anne Heywood: Virginia de Leyva
- Hardy Krüger: Father Paolo Arrigone
- Antonio Sabàto: Giampaolo
- Tino Carraro: Monsignor Barca
- Luigi Pistilli: Count de Fuentes
- Carla Gravina: Caterina da Meda
- Margarita Lozano: Sister Benedetta Homati
- Caterina Boratto: Sister Francesca Imbersaga
- Giovanna Galletti: Sister Angela Sacchi
- Anna Maria Alegiani: Sister Ottavia Ricci
- Laura Belli: Sister Candida Colomba
- Renzo Giovampietro: Vicar Saraceno
- Pier Paolo Capponi: Count Taverna
- Maria Michi: Sister Bianca Homati

== Production ==
This was Heywood's first leading role after her success in The Fox.

== Reception ==
The film was huge a box office success in Italy, grossing over $3 million.
