= Milano (newspaper) =

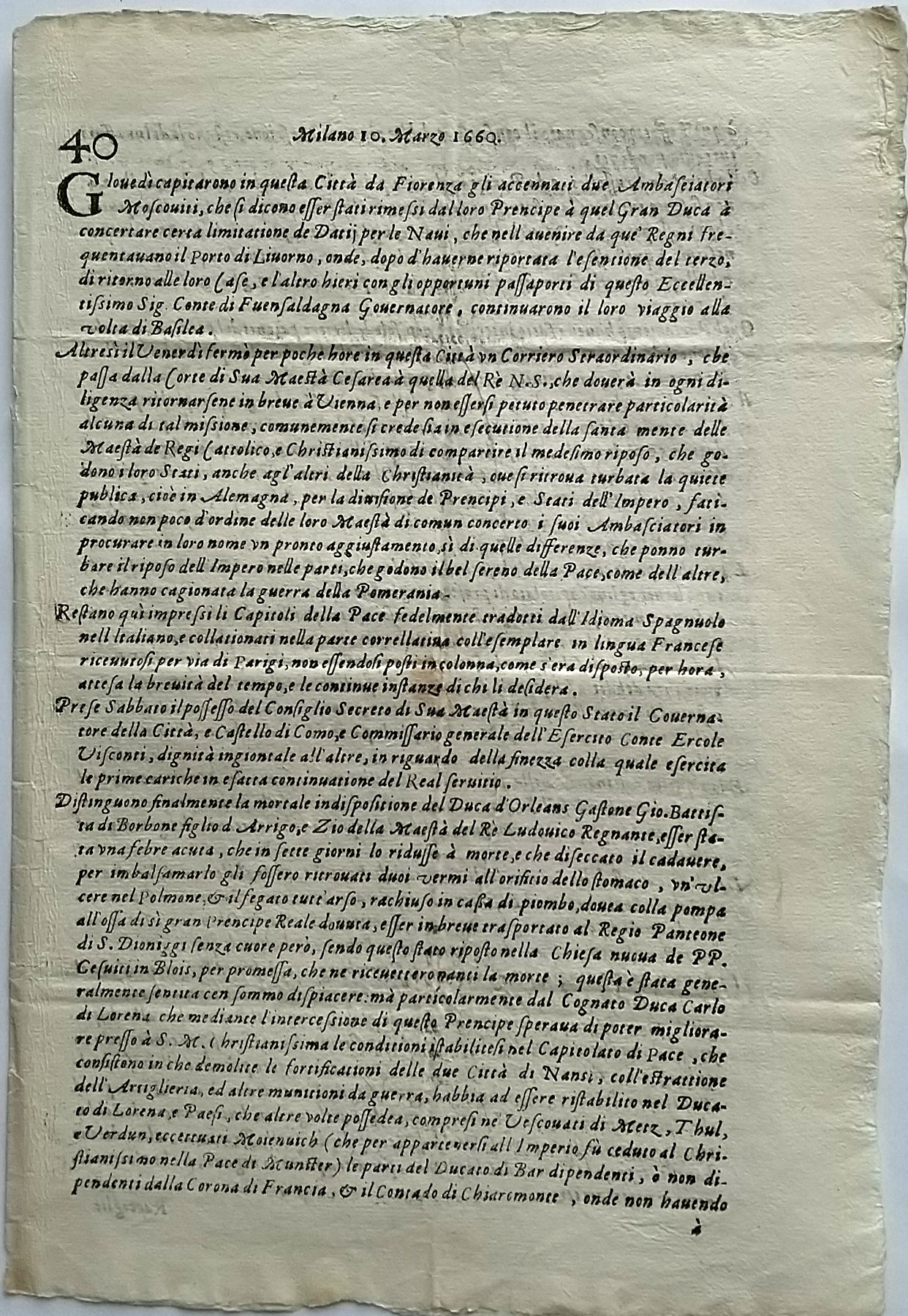
- an issue of 1660 (Note: This issue of 10 March 1660 reports in the first page the death of Gaston, Duke of Orléans.)
- Publisher: Malatesta Family
- Founded: November 28, 1640
- Ceased publication: December 1768
- Language: Italian
- City: Milan

Milano was a newspaper published in Milan from 1640 to 1768. It is considered one of the oldest newspapers in Italy.

== History ==
Milano was the first gazette published in the city of Milan. The first known number still in existence is dated 28 November 1640, (Note: The issue dated 28 November 1640, along with others, is kept in the Vatican Library, shelfmark Barberini.Q.II.46.) but it is probable that the printing started some months before. As all the newspapers of such time, it derived directly from hand-writing newssheets. It is probable, but it is not verified, that the editor of the Milano was Filippo Velasca who during the 1640s was a compiler of handwritten Avvisi in Milan.

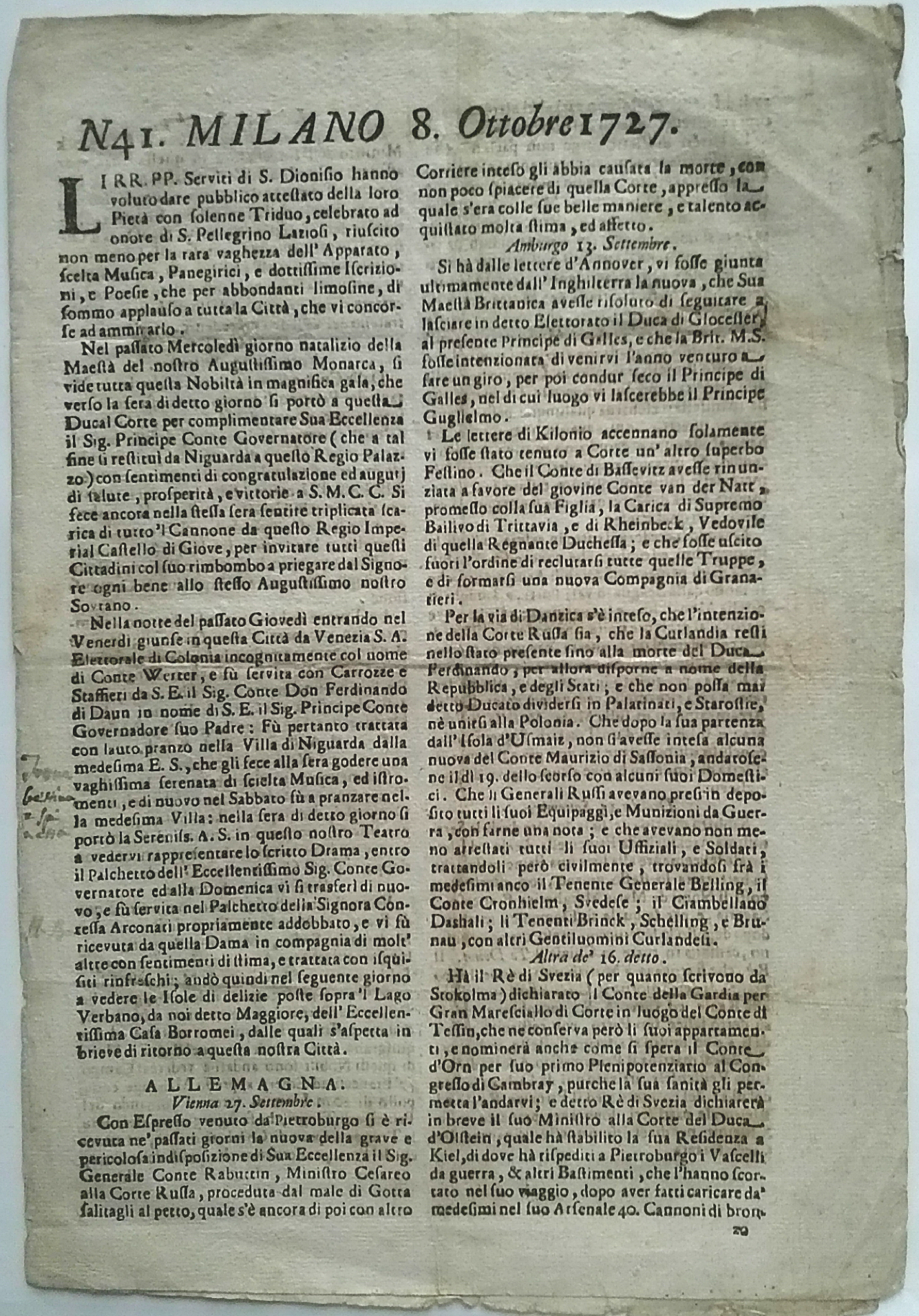
An issue of 1727

Since 1640 the typographer was surely the Malatesta family who continued to publish it for all the life of the newspaper. The Malatestas were the official printer of the government in Duchy of Milan, having the monopoly of the official publications. They succeeded to pass this privilege for many generations, from Panfolfo (fl. 1594—1626) to Giulio Cesare (fl. 1635—1664), Giovanni Battista (fl. 1635—1654), Marc'Antonio Pandolfo (fl. 1664—1715) who in January 1672 started to print his name in the last page of the newspaper, and finally his nephew, Giuseppe Richini Malatesta (born in 1694 and died in 1793). Due to their privilege of publishing, the Malatestas were like the voice of the Government.

The Milano suspended its publications from 1697 to June 1706, when it restarted under the new Habsburg government of the Duchy of Milan. It was published on Wednesdays on a weekly basis.

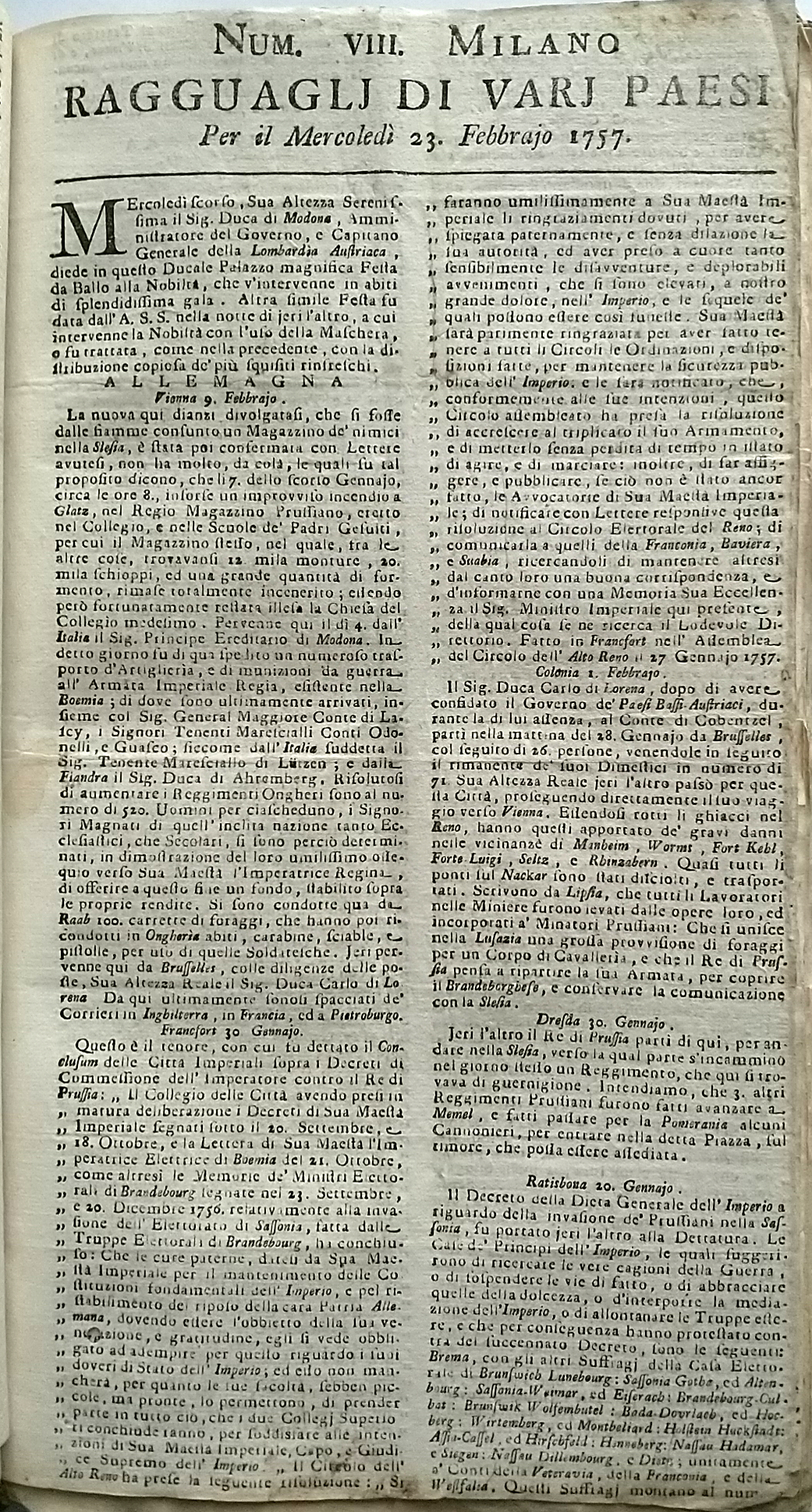
An issue of 1757

In October 1746 the newspaper took the additional title Ragguaglj di varj paesi (transl. News of many countries), always published by the Malatestas on Wednesdays. Following a decision of Karl Joseph von Firmian, at the beginnings of 1769 this newspaper was substituted by the Gazzetta di Milano, which during that year was directed by Giuseppe Parini.
