= La monaca di Monza (1962 film) =

- Directed by: Carmine Gallone
- Written by: Lucia Drudi Demby
- Cinematography: Tonino Delli Colli
- Music by: Giovanni Fusco
- Release date: 10 May 1962
- Running time: 100 minutes
- Country: Italy
- Language: Italian

La monaca di Monza is a 1962 Italian film directed by Carmine Gallone. It stars Gabriele Ferzetti, Giovanna Ralli and Mario Feliciani. The film is about a young nobleman who seduces a nun, leading to the death of the man and the internment of the woman. The film is a drama but is laced with satire.

== Cast ==
- Giovanna Ralli as Virginia de Leyva
- Gabriele Ferzetti as Gian Paolo Osio
- Mario Feliciani as Don Martino de Leyva
- Lilla Brignone as Donna Marianna
- Gino Cervi as Cardinale Borromeo
- Emma Gramatica as Badessa Anziana
- Evi Maltagliati as Badessa Inbeserco
- Elisa Cegani as La Monaca Portinaia
- Corrado Pani as Molteno
- Giulia Rubini as Benedetta
- Rosy Mazzacurati as Ottavia
- Fosco Giachetti as Monsignor Barca
- Hélène Chanel as Caterina
- Alberto Lupo as Giudice
