= Il Corriere di Gabinetto – Gazzetta di Milano =

Italian newspaper (1794–1797)

Il Corriere di Gabinetto Gazzetta di Milano
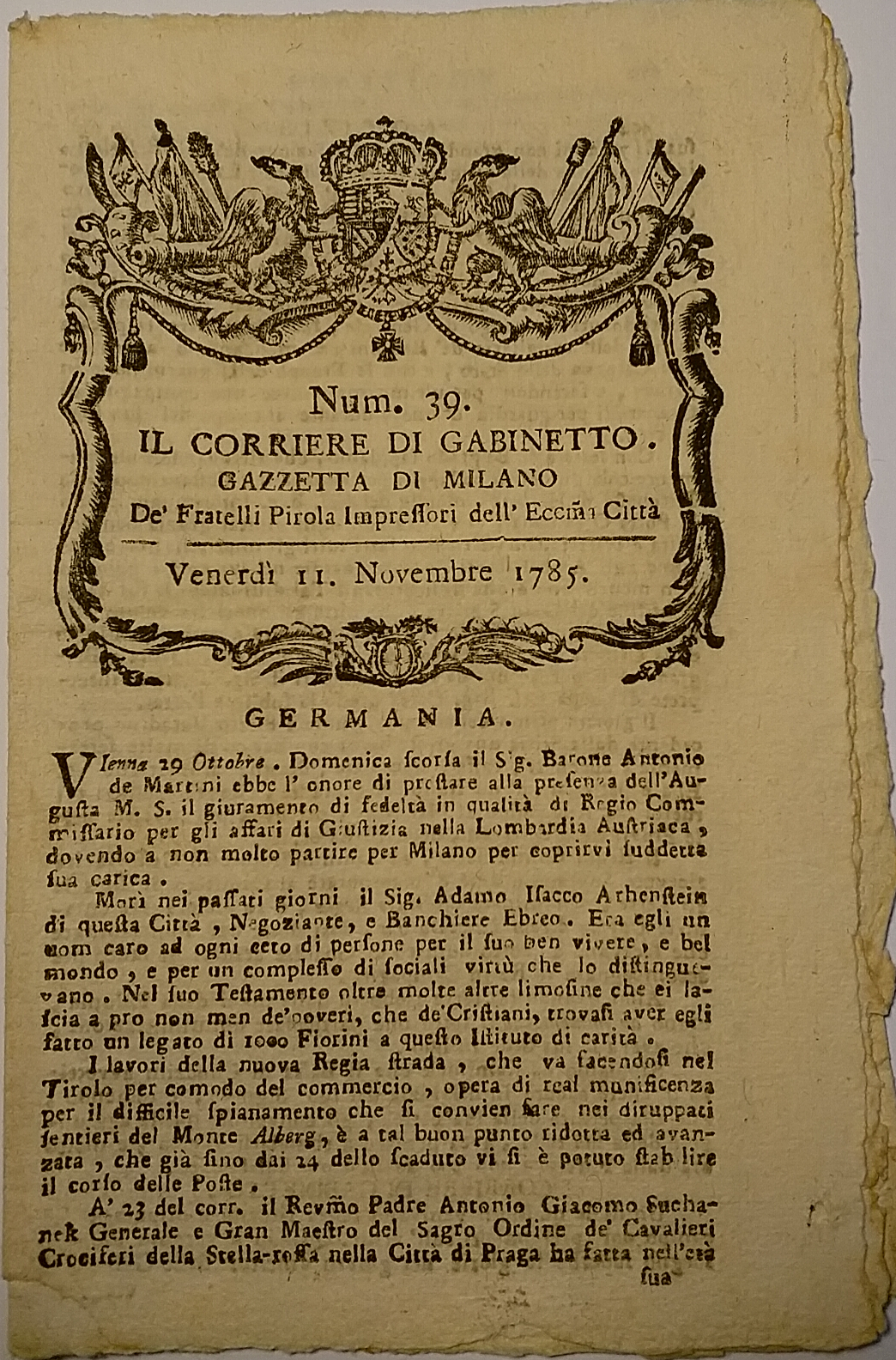
- number 39 of 1785
- Publisher: Pirola
- Founded: July 1, 1785
- Language: Italian
- Ceased publication: December 28, 1797
- City: Milan

Il Corriere di Gabinetto – Gazzetta di Milano was a newspaper published in Milan from 1 July 1785 to 1797 by the Pirola brothers. It was known as Il Corriere di Gabinetto from 2 July 1794 to May 1796 and as Gazzetta di Milano from 21 May 1796 to his last number dated 28 December 1797.

== History ==
The brothers Giacomo and Gaetano Pirola were active as typographer in Milan from 1781. In 1782 they obtained the authorization of the government and started the publication of the Giornale Enciclopedico di Milano - Notizie Storico Politiche (in English: Encyclopedic journal of Milan, historical and political news). On 1 July 1785 that newspaper was discontinued and the first number of the Il Corriere di Gabinetto - Gazzetta di Milano (in English: Courier of Cabinet, Gazette of Milan) was issued always by the Pirolas. Sometime it had a literary supplement named Estratto della letteratura europea (in English: Extract from European literature). The editor, in charge of choosing the news to publish and of writing them, was Gaetano Morandi, a priest from Genoa. The newspaper had in 1789 about one thousand subscribers.

In 1792 died Gaetano Pirola and Giacomo continued alone. From 2 July 1794 the newspaper was named simply Il Corriere di Gabinetto and from 21 May 1796 (just after the entrance of Napoleon in Milano) it changed the name in Gazzetta di Milano. This Gazzetta of Milano ceased to be published at the end of 1797, surpassed by the Jacobin newspapers.

The Giornale Enciclopedico di Milano - Notizie Storico Politiche was initially published on a weekly basis, from 28 June 1782 it was issued on Mondays and Fridays, as it was its successor, the Il Corriere di Gabinetto - Gazzetta di Milano. From January 1788 it was issued on Mondays and Thursdays, from 2 July 1794 on Wednesdays and Fridays, in 1796 it was issued three times a week, and in 1797 again two times a week.

The Il Corriere di Gabinetto - Gazzetta di Milano was usually composed of 12 pages of Fridays, covering foreign and military news, a limited number of news from Italy, some advertisements and commercial information, the exchanges rates and the number of deaths in Milan. The issues of Mondays were less extensive.
