= Virginia, la monaca di Monza =

2005 television film

- Screenplay by: Nicola Lusuardi; Francesco Scardamaglia
- Directed by: Alberto Sironi
- Starring: Giovanna Mezzogiorno
- Composer: Carlo Crivelli
- Original language: Italian

Production
- Cinematography: Stefano Ricciotti
- Editor: Stefano Chierchiè
- Running time: 200 min.

Original release
- Network: Rai 1
- Release: 2004

Virginia, la monaca di Monza (i.e. "Virginia, the nun of Monza") is a 2004 Italian-Spanish television movie directed by Alberto Sironi and starring Giovanna Mezzogiorno. The film is loosely based on real life events of Marianna de Leyva, better known as "The Nun of Monza", whose story was made famous by the Alessandro Manzoni's novel The Betrothed.

== Cast ==
- Giovanna Mezzogiorno as Virginia Maria de Leyva
- Stefano Dionisi as Paolo Osio
- Lluís Homar as Father Castells
- Xabier Elorriaga as Cardinal Borromeo
- Delia Boccardo as Virginia's Mother
- Toni Bertorelli as Don Martino
- Quim Gutiérrez as Carles
- Cristiana Capotondi as Marianna Aliprandi
- Renato Scarpa as Monsignor Ripamonti
- Pia Lanciotti as Mare Abadessa
- Bea Segura as Clara
- Biancamaria D'Amato as Sister Benedetta
- Nicoletta Bertorelli as Sister Candida
- Giacinto Ferro as Joaquim Nunes
- Marco Foschi as Duke Grimani
- Laura Pasetti as Sister Francesca
- Serena Rossi as Angelica
