= Osio (family) =

Italian noble family

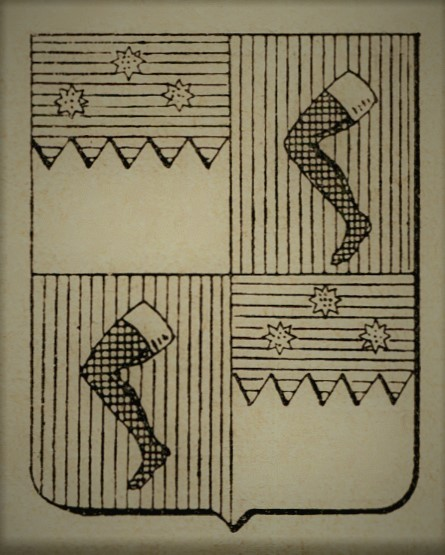
- Coat of arms of the Osii of Milan
- Earlier spellings: de Oxa, de Oxiis
- Origin: Milan
- Founded: XII century
- Connected families: Della Torre (allies); Visconti (rivals)

The House of Osio (Osii) were an Italian noble family who rose to prominence in Lombardy in the 12th century.

== History ==
The family claimed to descend from Osius, high priest of the temple of Delphi.

In the Milanese Chronicles the Osio name under the several spellings is mentioned in the 12th Century 12 times, in the 13th Century 16 times, in the 14th Century 4 times. The following are some of the items: In 1162 an Osa with his son Alberto, was delegated by the City of Milan to negotiate with Frederick I to order the siege of this city to be raised. In 1176 an Oxio died fighting in the battle of Legnano. In 1185 Albertus de Oxa was Podestà (Chief Magistrate) of Padua (1175) and Bergamo (1185). Also in 1185 Guglielmo de Oxa was one of the Milan delegates who concluded the treaty with Emperor Frederick at Reggio. In 1203 Manfredo Osio was one of the five Podestà elected to govern Milan. In 1218 a Gandolfo de Oxiis was one of the authorities in Cremona.

The exact genealogy of the Osio family which begins in the year 1230, shows that there were soon two principal branches: one of Goffredino and the other of Ingresto with the spellings de Oxiis, de Oxa, de Oxio. Allied to the Della Torre, the Osii struggled against the Visconti for the hegemony over Milan between the second half of the 13th century and 1311. Members of later generations scattered to Bergamo, Verona, Cremona, and Ravenna. Many of the descendants of Goffredino appear to have devoted themselves to study and it is likely that all the Osio who became worthy church officials, civil officials, professors, and scholars were of this branch. A notable member was Bartolomeo, professor of law at the University of Montpellier, who in 1316 counted Petrarch among his pupils. Felice Osio (1587–1631) was a notable scholar, and writer and a professor at the University of Padua. The connection of the family of Stanislaus Hosius with the Osio family in Italy is possible and very probable. His studies in Italian universities, and his coat of arms indicate it.

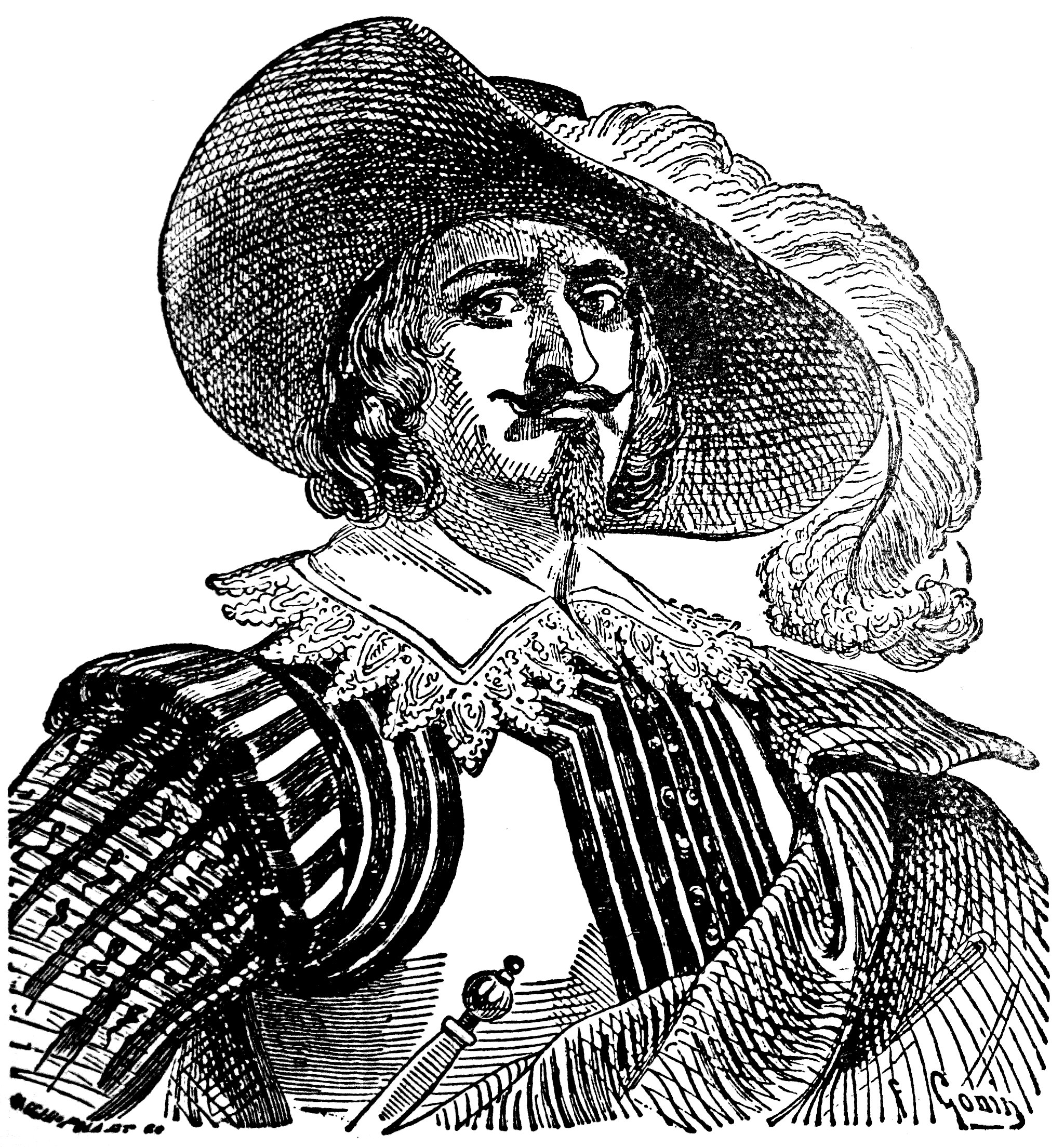
Portrait of count Giovanni Paolo Osio, engraving by Francesco Gonin, 1840

One of the later branches became abnormal and through several generations, produced criminals and murderers. One of them, count Giovanni Paolo Osio (1572-1608) became the lover of the Nun of Monza. The story was a source of inspiration for Alessandro Manzoni.

In Milan, situated on the Piazza Mercanti, is the beautiful Loggia degli Osii, a Gothic structure erected in 1314 at the desire of Matteo I Visconti, Duke of Milan. It took its name from being built on a site or estate on which stood previously a house inhabited by the Osio family. This Loggia had been somewhat neglected and in 1904, at the instigation of the Countess Maria Osio Scanzi, the building was reconstructed. The entire cost was donated by the Countess as a memorial to her deceased husband, General Egidio Osio.

== Notable members ==
- Pietra Osio (died 1297) abbess of the Monastero Maggiore of Milan.
- Bartolomeo Osio (14th century), professor of law.
- Count Giovanni Paolo Osio (1572–1608) Italian nobleman and criminal, lover of the Nun of Monza.
- Felice Osio (1587–1631) Italian cleric, scholar, and writer.
- Luigi Osio (1803–1873) Italian scholar and archivist appointed director general of the archives of Lombardy in 1851.
- Count Egidio Osio (1840–1902), Italian general.

== Bibliography ==
- Giornale araldico-genealogico-diplomatico italiano (in Italian). Vol. 22. Bari: Presso la direzione del Giornale. 1894. pp. 53-4.
- Crollalanza, Goffredo (1895). Giornale araldico-genealogico-diplomatico (in Italian). Vol. 23. Bari: Presso la direzione del Giornale. p. 169.
- Moretti, Gaetano (1908). La conservazione dei monumenti della Lombardia dal 1º luglio 1900 al 31 dicembre 1906. Milano: Tipografia Umberto Allegretti. pp. 66–67.
