= Luciano Odorisio =

Italian film and television director

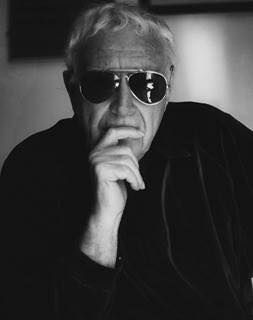
Luciano Orodisio

Luciano Orodisio (born 7 March 1942 in Chieti) is an Italian film and television director, screenwriter, and occasional actor.

== Filmography ==
=== Director ===
Film

- L'educatore autorizzato (1980)
- Sciopèn (1982)
- Dear Maestro (1983)
- Il momento magico (1984)
- Devils of Monza (1987)
- Via Paradiso (1988)
- Ne parliamo lunedì (1990)
- Una famiglia in giallo (1991)
- Senza movente (1999)
- Guardiani delle nuvole (2004)

Television

- Mio figlio (2005)
- Il sangue e la rosa (2008)
- Io non dimentico (2008)
- Io e mio figlio - Nuove storie per il commissario Vivaldi (2010)

=== Screenwriter ===
Film

- L'educatore autorizzato, directed by Luciano Odorisio (1980)
- Sciopèn, directed by Luciano Odorisio (1982)
- Il momento magico, directed by Luciano Odorisio (1984)
- Devils of Monza, directed by Luciano Odorisio (1987)
- Via Paradiso, directed by Luciano Odorisio (1988)
- Ne parliamo lunedì, directed by Luciano Odorisio (1990)

Television

- Mio figlio, directed by Luciano Odorisio (2005)
- Io e mio figlio - Nuove storie per il commissario Vivaldi, directed by Luciano Odorisio (2010)

=== Actor ===
- Uccideva a freddo, directed by Guido Celano (1966)
- The Seed of Man, directed by Marco Ferreri (1969)
