= List of the oldest newspapers =

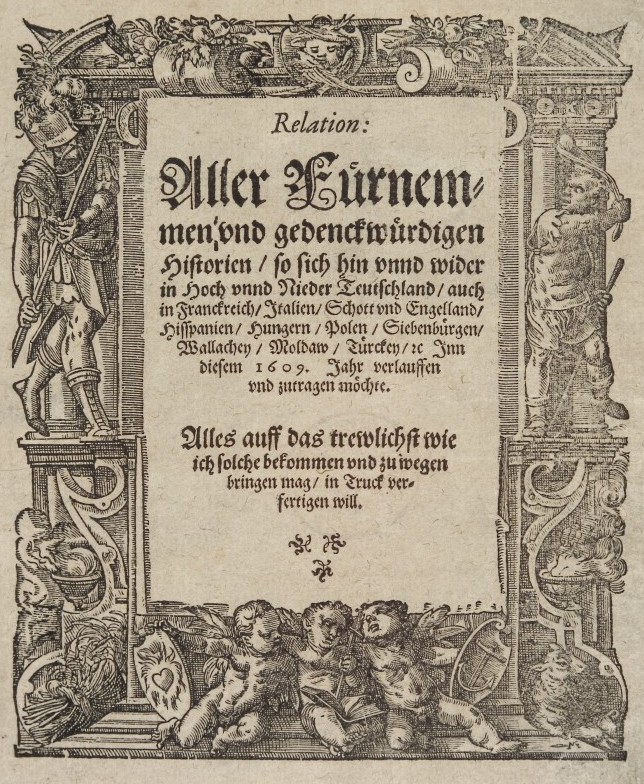
A 1609 title page of the German Relation, the world's first newspaper founded in 1605

This list of the oldest newspapers sorts the newspapers of the world by the date of their first publication. The earliest newspapers date to 17th century Europe when printed periodicals began rapidly to replace the practice of hand-writing newssheets. The emergence of the new media branch has to be seen in close connection with the simultaneous spread of the printing press from which the publishing press derives its name. The oldest extant newspaper in the world still issued under its original title is the Gazzetta di Mantova, regularly published in Mantua, Italy, since 1664.

== Definition ==
Newspapers − apart from being printed − are typically expected to meet four criteria:

- Publicity: Its contents are reasonably accessible to the public.
- Periodicity: It is published at regular intervals.
- Currentness: Its information is up to date.
- Universality: It covers a range of topics.

== By region ==
=== Europe ===
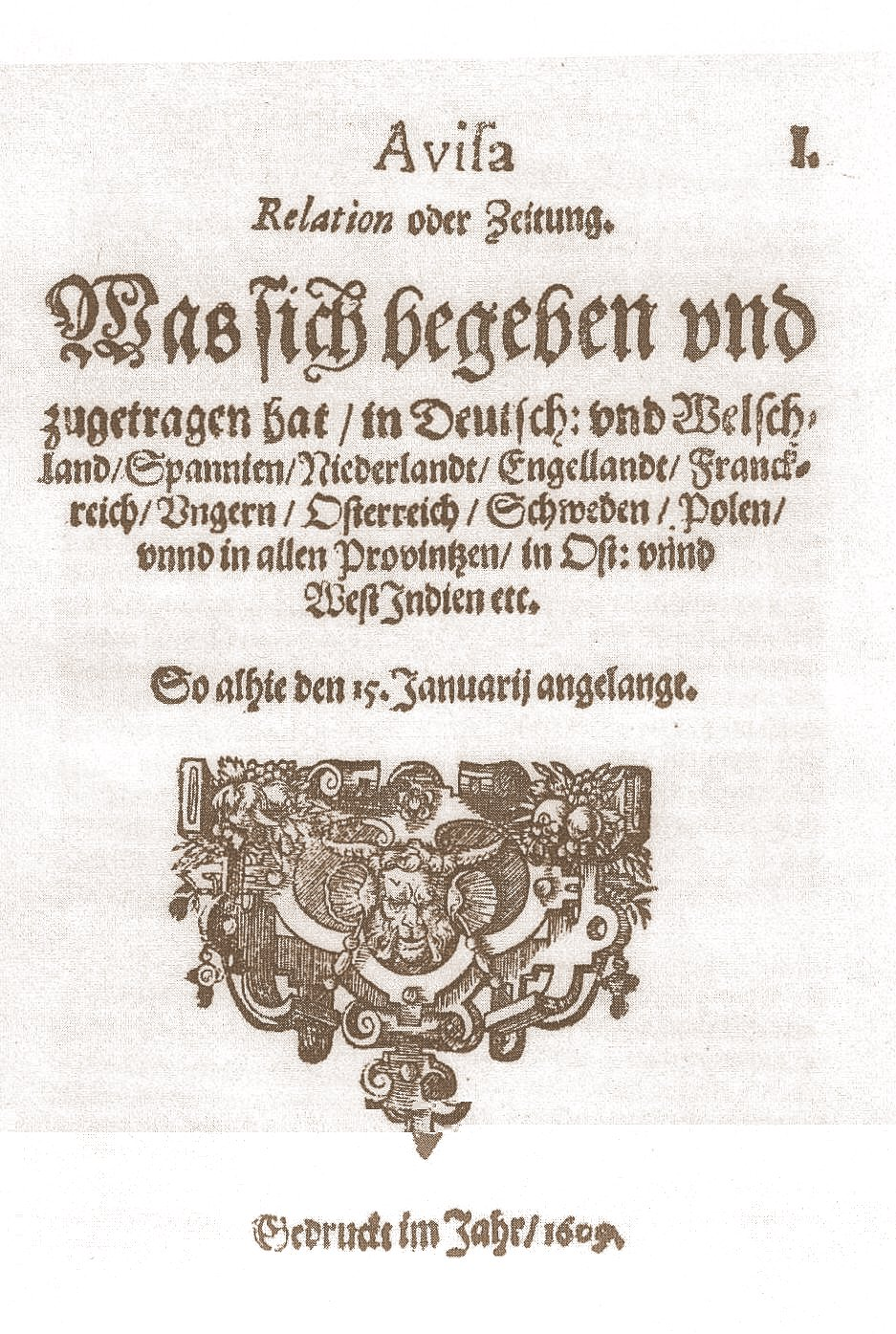
Avisa Relation oder Zeitung, the second-oldest newspaper

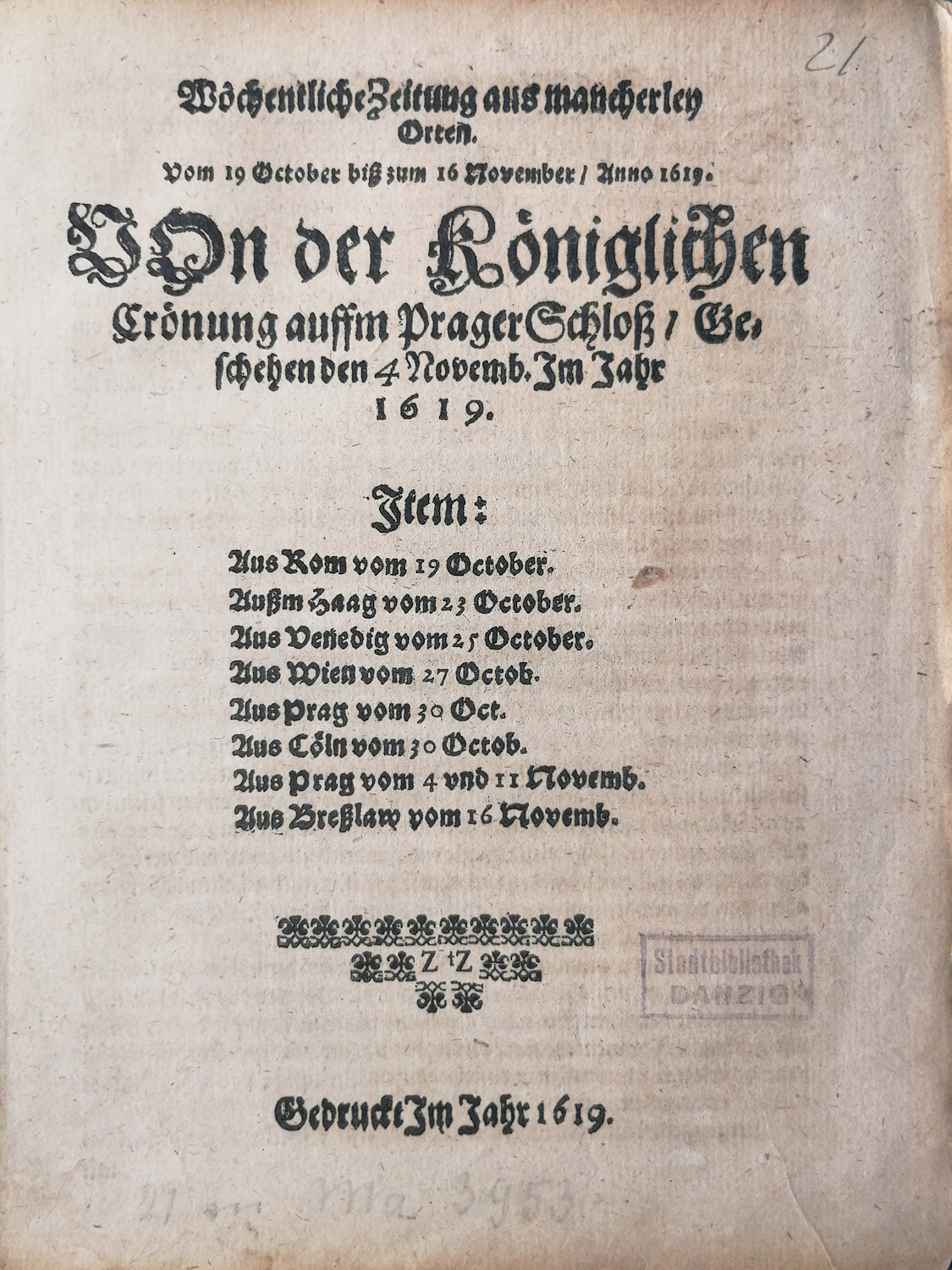
Title page of "Wöchentliche Zeitung aus mancherley Orten", Gdańsk 1619

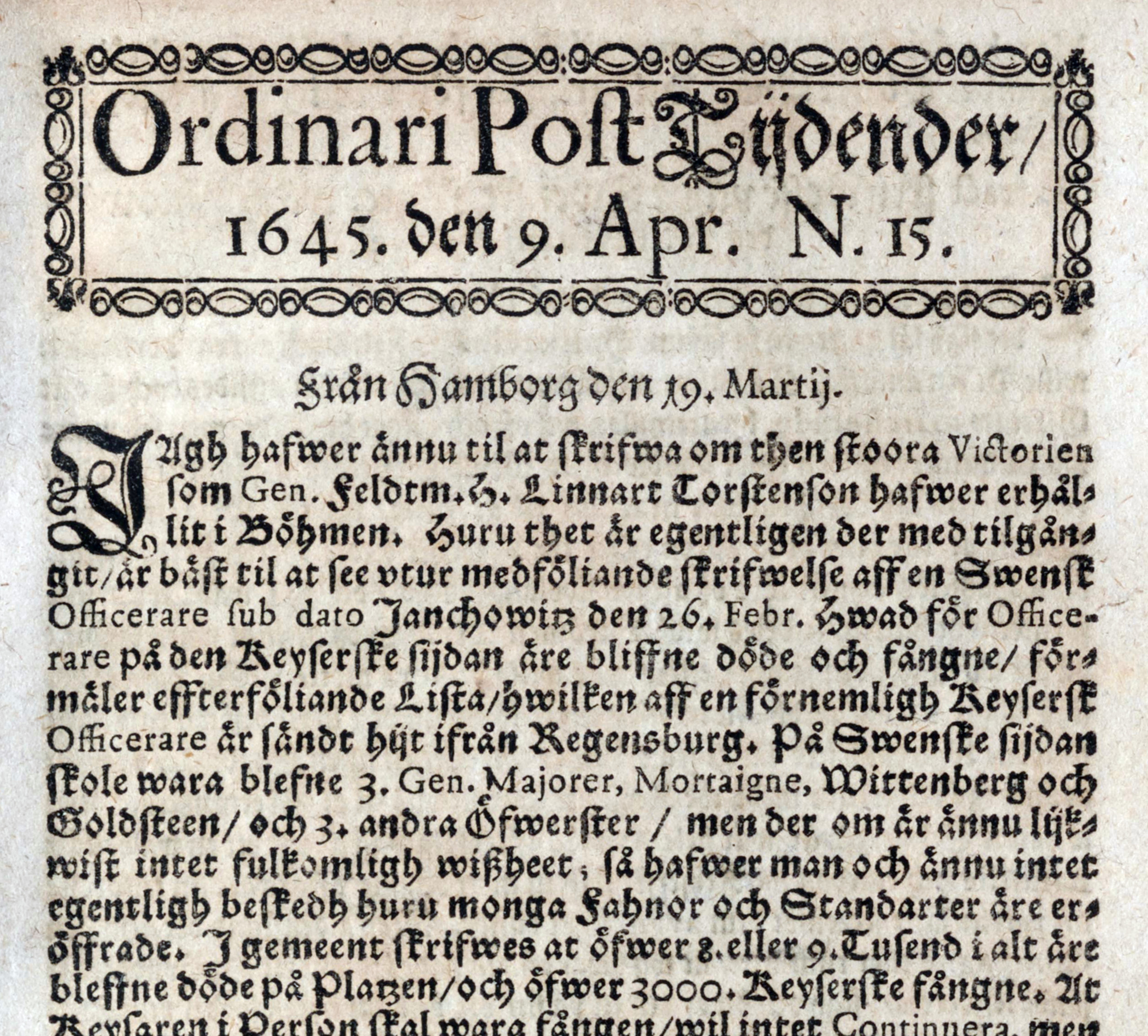
Ordinari Post Tijdender, the world's oldest newspaper still published (since 1645, digital-only since 2007)

Date	Newspaper	Language	Place	Country/Region	Notes
1605	Relation aller Fürnemmen und gedenckwürdigen Historien	German	Strasbourg	Holy Roman Empire	World's first weekly newspaper by Johann Carolus
1609	Avisa Relation oder Zeitung	German	Wolfenbüttel	Brunswick-Wolfenbüttel, Holy Roman Empire	
1610	Ordinari-Zeitung	German	Basel	Old Swiss Confederacy (Note: Nominally associated with the Holy Roman Empire until 1648, but de facto independent since 1499)	
1615	Name not given in source	German	Frankfurt	Holy Roman Empire	
1617	Name not given in source	German	Berlin	Brandenburg, Holy Roman Empire	
1618	Courante uyt Italien, Duytslandt, &c.	Dutch	Amsterdam	Holland, Dutch Republic (Note: Nominally associated with the Holy Roman Empire until 1648, but de facto separated since 1556)	Considered the world's first broadsheet because it was published in folio instead of quarto size. Defunct 1664
1618	Wöchentliche Zeitung aus mancherley Orten	German	Danzig/Gdańsk	Polish–Lithuanian Commonwealth	Weekly news from many places. Oldest newspaper in Poland. The oldest preserved copies come from 1619. Defunct 1652
1620	Nieuwe Tijdinghen	Dutch	Antwerp	Spanish Netherlands	Defunct 1629
1621	Corante	English	London	England	seven known surviving copies printed between 24 September and 4 November 1621
1623	Ordinari-Zeitung	German	Zürich	Old Swiss Confederacy	Was published at least until 1671
1631	La Gazette	French	Paris	France	First French-language newspaper and first weekly magazine published in France. Existed between 30 May 1631 and 30 September 1915.
1634	Ordinari-Post-Zeitungen	German	?	Old Swiss Confederacy	
1639	Genova	Italian	Genoa	Republic of Genoa	Published from 1639 to 1646. Oldest newspaper of Italy in accordance with the oldest issue still preserved.
1640	Milano	Italian	Milan	Duchy of Milan	Published from 1640 to 1768
1641	The heads of severall proceedings in the present Parliament	English	Edinburgh	Scotland	
1641	Gazeta de Barcelona	Catalan, Spanish	Barcelona	Principality of Catalonia	Published from 1641 to 1808. First newspaper of Catalonia and the Iberian Peninsula, as well as the first newspaper published in Catalan language
1641	Gazeta em Que Se Relatam as Novas Que Houve Nesta e Que vieram de Várias Partes	Portuguese	Lisbon	Kingdom of Portugal	First Portuguese newspaper, ended its publication in 1647
1642	Genova	Italian	Genoa	Republic of Genoa	Published from 1642 to 1684
1642	Bologna	Italian	Bologna	Papal States	Published from 1642 to 1787
1645	Ordinari Post Tijdender	Swedish	Stockholm	Sweden	Oldest still published (today in digital-only form) newspaper in the world. Online-only since 2007.
1650	Einkommende Zeitungen	German	Leipzig	Saxony, Holy Roman Empire	First worldwide daily newspaper, published by Timotheus Ritzsch
1656	Weeckelycke Courante van Europa	Dutch	Haarlem	Holland, Dutch Republic	The name was changed to Oprechte Haerlemsche Courant in 1664. The newspaper merged with the Haarlems Dagblad in 1942, which is still published.
1661	La Gazeta	Spanish	Madrid	Kingdom of Spain	Until 2008 December, oldest print edition still published in the world, under the name Boletín Oficial del Estado. From 2009 online edition only.
1661	Merkuriusz Polski Ordynaryjny	Polish	Kraków	Polish–Lithuanian Commonwealth	Moved to Warsaw in May 1661, last issues published 22 July 1661.
1664	Gazzetta di Mantova	Italian	Mantua	Duchy of Mantua, Holy Roman Empire	The oldest newspaper still in print in the world. Still published as a daily (paper and online) newspaper.
1665	Oxford Gazette	English	Oxford	England	From issue 24 in 1666, the paper was printed in London and renamed London Gazette; this is still published.
1666	Den Danske Mercurius	Danish	Copenhagen	Denmark-Norway	
1673	Europäische Relation	German	Hamburg	Germany	Published from 1673 until 1699
1674	Ordinari Wochen-Zeitung	German	Zürich	Old Swiss Confederacy	Freytägliche Wochenzeitung (1710), Wochentliche Freytags-Zeitung (1774), Zürcher Zeitung (1784–98), Züricher Freitags-Zeitung (−1853), Zürcherische Freitagszeitung (−1914)
1675	Ordinari Freytags Post-Zeitung	German	Reval	Estonia, Swedish Empire	First newspaper in the modern Baltic states. Renamed to Ordinari Donnerstags Post-Zeitung in 1677. Last issue in 1678.
1677	Modona	Italian	Modena	Duchy of Modena	Published by Demetrio Degni from 1677 to 1701.
1679	Donnerstägliche Post- und Ordinari-Zeitung	German	Zürich	Old Swiss Confederacy	
1682	Basler Mittwochs- und Samstags-Zeitung	German	Basel	Old Swiss Confederacy	
1686	Die Kuranten	Yiddish	Amsterdam	Netherlands	Biweekly that published international news in Yiddish and the first newspaper in Yiddish. Changed owner/publisher once. Folded in 1687. Years estimated from a few surviving copies.
1679	Ordinari-Mittwochen-Zeitung	German	Bern	Old Swiss Confederacy	
1690	Berrow's Worcester Journal	English	Worcester	England	Still published – claims to be the oldest newspaper continually published up to the present day
1702	Daily Courant	English	London	England	World first daily newspaper. Last issue in 1735, when it merged with the Daily Gazetteer.
1702	Vedomosti	Russian	Moscow	Russia	Moved to St. Petersburg in 1711, in 1728 renamed Sankt-Petersburgskie Vedomosti, in 1914 renamed Petrogradskie Vedomosti. Last issue in 1917. Re-created in 1991, and is still published.
1703	Wiener Zeitung	German	Vienna	Austria, Habsburg monarchy	Ceased daily print publication in 2023.
1705	Hildesheimer Relations-Courier	German	Hildesheim	Holy Roman Empire	Oldest surviving newspaper in Germany, now published as Hildesheimer Allgemeine Zeitung.
1705	Mercurius Hungaricus	Latin	Levoča, Bardejov	Kingdom of Hungary	Oldest Hungarian newspaper, issued by the insurgency command of Rákoczi's Uprising, it had 7 issues and last printed in 1710.
1709	The Tatler	English	London	Kingdom of Great Britain	Founded by Richard Steele. Last issue in 1711.
1709	The Worcester Post-Man	English	Worcester	Kingdom of Great Britain	Published since 1753 as Berrow's Worcester Journal. No evidence for claimed publication since 1690.
1710	The Examiner	English	London	Kingdom of Great Britain	Best known for the contributions by Jonathan Swift. Last issue in 1714.
1711	The Spectator	English	London	Kingdom of Great Britain	Founded by Joseph Addison in 1711. Last issue in 1712.
1712	Stamford Mercury	English	Stamford	Kingdom of Great Britain	Claims to be "Britain's oldest continuously published newspaper title"
1715	Gazeta de Lisboa	Portuguese	Lisbon	Kingdom of Portugal	Ended its publication in 1820
1719	The Daily Post	English	London	Kingdom of Great Britain	Founded by Daniel Defoe in 1719. The post consisted of articles that spoke of current events, important dates, inventions, advances in modern sciences, and other things of that nature.
1719	Pražské poštovské noviny	Czech	Prague	Bohemia, Habsburg Monarchy	Weekly newspaper, published until 1819 (with a break in 1772–82).
1722	Gloucester Journal	English	Gloucester	Kingdom of Great Britain	First printed by Robert Raikes and William Dicey on Monday April 9, 1722, published weekly. Now called The Gloucester Gazette
1729	Salisbury Journal	English	Salisbury	Kingdom of Great Britain	First printed by William and Benjamin Collins, 1729, published weekly. Interrupted publishing in early days. Continuous since 1736.
1731	Gentleman's Magazine	English	London	Kingdom of Great Britain	Published until 1922. First to use the term magazine. Samuel Johnson's first regular employment as a writer was with The Gentleman's Magazine.
1733	Courrier d'Avignon	French	Avignon	Comtat Venaissin	Published until 1792 (with beaks between July 1768 and August 1769, and again between 30 November 1790 and 24 May 1791). Moved to Monaco (1769-1775).
1734	Lloyd's List	English	London	Kingdom of Great Britain	Now online-only. Now covering shipping news, marine insurance and global trade. Oldest English-language daily newspaper still in existence
1735	Gazzetta di Parma	Italian	Parma	Duchy of Parma, Holy Roman Empire	Still published. First publishing date uncertain; oldest printed issue perhaps dated from 19 April 1735.
1737	The Belfast News Letter	English	Belfast	Kingdom of Ireland	Still published. Oldest newspaper in Ireland still in circulation and the oldest daily English language newspaper still in circulation.
1738	Feuille d'Avis de Neuchâtel	French	Neuchâtel	Old Swiss Confederacy	Still published – oldest French-language daily newspaper still in existence
1741	Il Nuovo Postiglione	Italian	Venice	Republic of Venice	Founded by Giambattista Albrizzi, it covered foreign affairs; published until 1816.
1747	The Press and Journal	English	Aberdeen	Scotland, United Kingdom of Great Britain	Still published
1749	Berlingske	Danish	Copenhagen	Denmark-Norway	Still published. Originally titled Kjøbenhavnske Danske Post-Tidender
1749	Il Messaggiere	Italian	Modena	Duchy of Modena	Published up to 1859.
1752	Leeuwarder Courant	Dutch	Leeuwarden	Netherlands	Still published. Originally titled Leeuwarder Saturdagse Courant. The newspaper also publish articles in West Frisian.
1754	Yorkshire Post	English	Leeds	Kingdom of Great Britain	Still published
1756	Moskovskiye Vedomosti	Russian	Moscow	Russia	Published until 1917.
1758	Norrköpings Tidningar	Swedish	Norrköping	Sweden	Still published. Originally published weekly as Norrköpings Weko-Tidningar
1762	24 heures	Swiss French	Lausanne	Old Swiss Confederacy	Still published. Originally published weekly as Annonces et avis divers
1764	Newcastle Chronicle	English	Newcastle	United Kingdom	Still published as Evening Chronicle
1765	Monitor	Polish	Warsaw	Polish–Lithuanian Commonwealth	Founded by Ignacy Krasicki and Franciszek Bohomolec and supported by King Stanisław August Poniatowski
1767	Adresseavisen	Norwegian	Trondheim	Denmark-Norway	Still published. Originally titled Kongelig allene privilegerede Trondheims Adresse-Contoirs Efterretninger
1767	Finns Leinster Journal	English	Kilkenny	Kingdom of Ireland	
1771	Tidningar Utgifne Af et Sällskap i Åbo	Swedish	Turku	Finland	Published 1771–1778 and 1782–1785.
1771	Ephemerides Zagrabienses	Latin	Zagreb	Kingdom of Croatia, Habsburg monarchy	Published in 1771 by Antun Jandera
1772	Derry Journal	English	Derry and Donegal	Kingdom of Ireland	Still published bi-weekly. Originally titled London-Derry Journal and General Advertiser, changed to its current name in 1880
1772	Fyens Stiftstidende	Danish	Odense	Denmark-Norway	Still published. Originally titled Kongelig Privilegerede Odense Adresse-Contoirs Efterretninger
1776	Gazeta Grodzieńska	Polish	Hrodna	Grand Duchy of Lithuania	Considered to be the first newspaper in Belarus and the first local newspaper in the Polish–Lithuanian Commonwealth. Last issue in 1783.
1776	Suomenkieliset Tieto-Sanomat	Finnish	Turku	Finland	Twice-monthly, 26 numbers were published.
1777	Avvisi	Italian	Genoa	Republic of Genoa	Published from 1777 to 1797. It included classified advertising.
1778	Notizie del mondo	Italian	Venice	Republic of Venice	Founded by Antonio Graziosi, it covered foreign affairs; published until 1815.
1780	Neue Zürcher Zeitung	German	Zürich	Switzerland	Still published. Originally titled Zürcher Zeitung. Renamed in 1821.
1780	Magyar Hírmondó	Hungarian	Bratislava (Pressburg)	Kingdom of Hungary	Published until 1803. The first Hungarian newspaper published in Hungarian language. Its founder and first editor was the Lutheran pastor Mátyás Ráth.
1783	The Herald	English	Glasgow	Kingdom of Great Britain	Still published
1785	The Times	English	London	Kingdom of Great Britain	Still published
1785	Il Corriere di Gabinetto; Gazzetta di Milano	Italian	Milano	Duchy of Milan	Published from 1 July 1785 to 28 December 1797
1791	Serbskija novini	Slavonic-Serbian	Vienna	Habsburg monarchy	First Serbian newspaper. Published from 1791 to 1792.
1791	The Observer	English	London	Kingdom of Great Britain	The world's first Sunday newspaper. Still published.
1794	Århus Stiftstidende	Danish	Århus	Denmark-Norway	Still published. Originally titled Aarhus Stifts-Tidende.
1798	Journal de Malte	French, Italian	Valletta	Malta under French occupation	First newspaper published in Malta. Defunct.
1801	Gibraltar Chronicle	English	Gibraltar	Gibraltar	Active
1803	Foglio d'Avvisi	Italian	Valletta	Malta	Defunct.
1804	L'Argo	Italian	Valletta	Malta	Defunct.
1804	Il Cartaginese	Italian	Valletta	Malta	Defunct.
1806	Tarto maa rahva Näddali-Leht	Estonian	Dorpat	Livonia, Russian Empire	Banned in the same year. First Estonian language newspaper.
1806	Hazai s Külföldi Tudósítások	Hungarian	Pest (Budapest)	Kingdom of Hungary	Published until 1848.
1812	Giornale di Malta	Italian	Valletta	Malta	Defunct.
1813	Göteborgs-Posten	Swedish	Gothenburg	Sweden	Still published.
1813	Malta Government Gazette	Italian, English, Maltese	Valletta	Malta	Still published (digital only since 2015).
1817	The Scotsman	English	Edinburgh	United Kingdom	Still published
1817	Journal de la Corse	French	Ajaccio	France	Still published
1818	The Westmorland Gazette	English	Kendal	United Kingdom	Still published
1819	Saqartvelos Gazeti (Georgian: საქართველოს გაზეთი)	Georgian	Tbilisi	Georgia	First Georgian newspaper. Published from 1819.
1821	The Guardian	English	Manchester	United Kingdom	Originally known as 'The Manchester Guardian'. Still published.
1824	Letopis Matice srpske	Serbian	Novi Sad, Budim	Serbia	Still published
1824	Åbo Underrättelser	Swedish	Åbo	Finland, Russian Empire	Still published.
1826	Le Figaro	French	Paris	France	Still published
1829	Curierul Românesc	Romanian	Bucharest	Wallachia, Ottoman Empire	Founded by Ion Heliade Rădulescu in April 1829. Last issue in 1859.
1829	Londonderry Sentinel	English	County Londonderry	United Kingdom	Founded in response to the Derry Journal's moderate stance on issues such as Catholic Emancipation. Originally called the Londonderry Sentinel and North West Advertiser. Still published.
1829	Albina Românească	Romanian	Iași	Moldavia, Ottoman Empire	Founded by Gheorghe Asachi in 1829. Last issue in 1850.
1830	Aftonbladet	Swedish	Stockholm	Sweden	Founded by Lars Johan Hierta in 1830. Still published.
1831	Takvim-i Vekayi	Turkish	Istanbul	Ottoman Empire	Also, Takvim-i Vekayi produced Armenian, Greek and Arabic language editions. Closed in 1891.
1834	Novine srbske	Serbian	Kragujevac, Belgrade	Serbia	First Serbian newspaper published in the country and the official journal of the Principality of Serbia. Founded by Dimitrije Davidović in 1830. Last issue in 1919.
1835	O Açoriano Oriental	Portuguese	Ponta Delgada, Azores	Portugal	Still published
1839	The Northern Standard	Irish	Monaghan	Ireland	Still Published
1841	Pesti Hírlap	Hungarian	Pest (Budapest)	Kingdom of Hungary	Published until 1944.
1843	The Economist	English	London	United Kingdom	Still published.
1844	Nieuwe Rotterdamsche Courant	Dutch	Rotterdam	Netherlands	Still published. The Nieuwe Rotterdamsche Courant (NRC) merged in 1970 with Algemeen Handelsblad (founded in 1828) into the NRC Handelsblad, which later changed its official name to NRC.
1846	L'Indépendant	French	Perpignan	France	Still published.
1847	Suometar	Finnish	Helsinki	Finland	Published 1847–1866, followed by Uusi Suometar 1869–1918 and Uusi Suomi 1919–1991. The web publication Uusi Suomi is not connected.
1848	Sydsvenskan	Swedish	Malmö	Sweden	Still published.
1848	Die Presse	German	Vienna	Austria	Still published
1848	Münchner Neueste Nachrichten	German	Munich	Kingdom of Bavaria	Succeeded by Süddeutsche Zeitung in 1945
1848	Зоря Галицька	Ukrainian	Lviv	Austrian Empire	Last issue in 1857
1853	Faro de Vigo	Spanish	Vigo	Spain	Still published. Oldest newspaper still published in Spain
1854	Surrey Comet	English	London	United Kingdom	Still published
1854	Comércio do Porto	Portuguese	Porto	Portugal	Established as the O Commercio, changed its name few months later. Last issue in July, 2005, after 151 years.
1854	Vasárnapi Ujság	Hungarian	Pest (Budapest)	Kingdom of Hungary	Sunday weekly newspaper. Published until 1921.
1854	El Norte de Castilla	Spanish	Valladolid	Spain	Still published
1855	The Daily Telegraph	English	London	United Kingdom	Still published
1855	A Aurora do Lima	Portuguese	Viana do Castelo	Portugal	Still published
1856	Hamagid	Hebrew	Ełk	East Prussia	First newspaper in Modern Hebrew language. Defunct 1903.
1856	La Meuse	French	Liège	Liège	
1856	Vasabladet	Swedish	Vaasa	Finland	Still published.
1857	Pärnu Postimees	Estonian	Pernau	Livonia, Russian Empire	Still published as Postimees
1859	Le Progrès	French	Lyon	France	Still published.
1859	La Nazione	Italian	Florence	Grand Duchy of Tuscany	Still published
1860	Straubinger Tagblatt	German	Straubing	Kingdom of Bavaria	Still published
1861	L'Osservatore Romano	Italian	Vatican City	Papal States	L'Osservatore Romano is the "semi-official" newspaper of the Holy See.
1863	Church Times	English	London	United Kingdom	Still published. The Church Times is an independent Anglican weekly newspaper.
1864	Dagens Nyheter	Swedish	Stockholm	Sweden	Founded by Rudolf Wall in 1864. Still published.
1864	Diário de Notícias	Portuguese	Lisbon	Portugal	Still published.
1864	Hufvudstadsbladet	Swedish	Helsinki	Finland	Still published.
1865	Il Sole 24 Ore	Italian	Milan	Italy	Still published.
1866	La Stampa	Italian	Turin	Italy	Still published.
1868	Manchester Evening News	English	Manchester	United Kingdom	Still published.
1870	Birmingham Mail	English	Birmingham	United Kingdom	Still published.
1870	La Dépêche du Midi	French	Toulouse	France	Still published.
1871	Keskisuomalainen	Finnish	Jyväskylä	Finland	Still published. Originally Keski-Suomi.
1873	Richmond and Twickenham Times	English	London	United Kingdom	Still published. The Richmond and Twickenham Times is a weekly London newspaper.
1873	Satakunnan Kansa	Finnish	Pori	Finland	Still published.
1873	Edinburgh Evening News	English	Edinburgh	United Kingdom	Still published.
1873	Sunderland Echo	English	Sunderland	United Kingdom	Still published as Sunderland Echo
1876	Il Corriere della sera	Italian	Milan	Italy	Still published.
1877	Dernières Nouvelles d'Alsace	French	Strasbourg	France	Still published.
1877	Népszava	Hungarian	Budapest	Hungary	Still published.
1879	The Liverpool Echo	English	Liverpool	United Kingdom	Still published.
1880	L'Eco di Bergamo	Italian	Bergamo	Italy	Still published.
1881	Il Piccolo	Italian	Trieste	Italy	Still published.
1881	Aamulehti	Finnish	Tampere	Finland	Still published.
1881	The Evening News	English	London	United Kingdom	Considered the first popular newspaper in London. Published until 1980, and briefly again in 1987.
1881	La Vanguardia	Spanish	Barcelona	Spain	Still published.
1882	El Pirineo Aragonés	Spanish	Jaca	Spain	Still published. First number April 23, 1882. Oldest Aragonese newspaper still published in the Autonomous Community of Aragon.
1884	Svenska Dagbladet	Swedish	Stockholm	Sweden	Still published.
1884	La Libre Belgique	French	Brussels	Belgium	Originally started as Le Patriote. Still published.
1886	Freedom	English	London	United Kingdom	Still published (semi-annual magazine and daily newswire)
1886	Lancashire Evening Post	English	Preston	United Kingdom	Still published.
1888	Financial Times	English	London	United Kingdom	Still published.
1888	Jornal de Notícias	Portuguese	Porto	Portugal	Still published.
1889	Helsingin Sanomat	Finnish	Helsinki	Finland	Still published. Started as Päivälehti, Helsingin Sanomat since 1905.
1889	L'Est Républicain	French	Nancy	France	Still published.
1891	Gazet van Antwerpen	Dutch	Antwerp	Flanders, Belgium	Still published
1891	La Nuova Sardegna	Italian	Sassari	Kingdom of Italy	Still published
1892	The Isis	English	Oxford	United Kingdom	Oldest extant student publication in the UK. Still published.
1893	Lidové noviny	Czech	Brno	Moravia, Austria-Hungary	Still published today in Prague, the Czech Republic, familiarly known as "Lidovky".
1893	Congleton Chronicle	English	Congleton	England, United Kingdom	Still published today in Congleton Town, the United Kingdom"".
1893	De Telegraaf	Dutch	Amsterdam	Netherlands	Still published. It is the largest newspaper in the Netherlands.
1894	Estia	Greek	Athens	Greece	Still published. Founded in 1874 as a magazine. It is the only newspaper in Greece which continues to use the polytonic orthography abolished in 1982.
1895	Heraldo de Aragón	Spanish	Zaragoza	Spain	Founded on September 20, 1895. Still published, familiarly known as Heraldo.
1895	Työmies	Finnish	Helsinki	Finland	Finland's largest labour newspaper and one of the four major papers in its time. Ceased to publish in the aftermath of the Finnish Civil War in 1918. Followed later in the same year by Suomen sosialidemokraatti, since 2001 Demokraatti, which is still published.
1896	Daily Mail	English	London	United Kingdom	Second popular newspaper by Lord Northcliffe. Considered to have brought on a major change in the English newspaper market and started the trend for popular mass journalism. Still published.
1899	Kaleva	Finnish	Oulu	Finland	Still published.
1904	Politika	Serbian	Belgrade	Serbia	The oldest daily newspaper still in circulation in the Balkans.

=== Americas ===
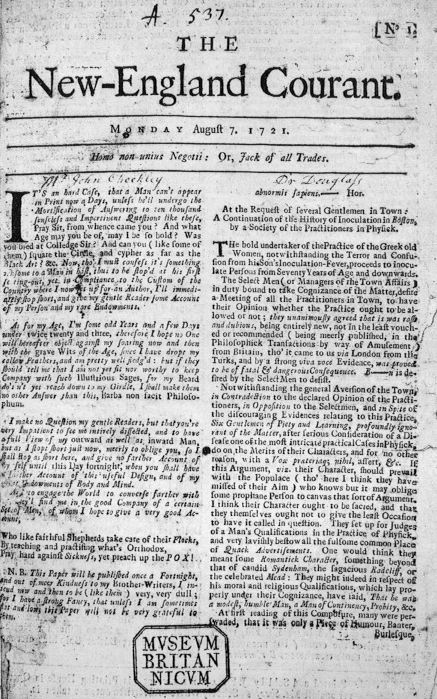
First issue of the New England Courant, the oldest newspaper in the Americas

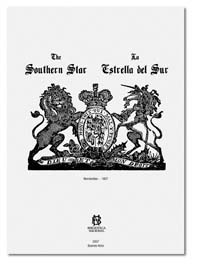
The Southern Star / La Estrella del sur was the first newspaper edited in Montevideo, Uruguay, in 1807, while the city was under British rule.

Date	Newspaper	Language	Place	Country/Region	Notes
1704	The Boston News-Letter	English	Boston, Massachusetts	Thirteen Colonies	Defunct
1718	Weekly Jamaica Courant	English	Kingston	Jamaica	Defunct
1721	The New-England Courant	English	Boston, Massachusetts	Thirteen Colonies	Defunct
1722	La Gaceta de México	Spanish	Mexico City	New Spain	Defunct; first paper published in Latin America
1727	Maryland Gazette	English	Annapolis, Maryland	United States	Still published but as The Capital
1752	Halifax Gazette	English	City of Halifax, Nova Scotia	British North America	Defunct; first paper in North America but is published as a government gazette, and not a newspaper, since 1867.
1756	The New Hampshire Gazette	English	New Hampshire	Thirteen Colonies	Still published; oldest extant North American paper, but was published as a weekly supplement of a different newspaper from the 1890s. The current owner bought the name rights in 1989, but not the actual paper.
1758	Newport Mercury	English	Newport, Rhode Island	Thirteen Colonies	Still published, but ceased publication during the American Revolutionary War.
June 1764	Quebec Chronicle-Telegraph	English; Formerly bilingual French-English	Quebec City, Quebec	British North America	Still published; oldest surviving North American paper with continuous corporate existence
October 1764	The Hartford Courant	English	Hartford, Connecticut	Thirteen Colonies	Still published.
1768	The Boston Chronicle	English	Boston, Massachusetts	United States	Defunct
1778	The Montreal Gazette	English since 1822 (Formerly French, it became bilingual French-English in the late 1700s)	Montreal	Province of Quebec	Still published
1785	Gazeta de Santafé de Bogotá	Spanish	Bogotá	New Granada	Defunct. First newspaper in Colombia
1785	The Augusta Chronicle	English	Augusta, Georgia	United States	Still published
1785	The Poughkeepsie Journal	English	Poughkeepsie, New York	United States	Still published. In 1788, the editor of the Journal was the official reporter of the ratification of the United States Constitution by New York in that year. The paper also served as a launching point of stories during the Franklin D. Roosevelt administration when the then-President was at his estate in nearby Hyde Park.
1786	Daily Hampshire Gazette	English	Northampton, Massachusetts	United States	Still published
1786	Pittsburgh Post-Gazette	English	Pittsburgh, Pennsylvania	United States	Still published
1789	The Berkshire Eagle	English	Pittsfield, Massachusetts	United States	Still published
1790	El Diario de Lima	Spanish	Lima	Peru	Defunct. First daily newspaper of the country.
1792	The Recorder	English	Greenfield, Massachusetts	United States	Still published
1794	Rutland Herald	English	Rutland, Vermont	United States	Still published. The Herald is the oldest family-owned newspaper in continuous operation, published under the same name in the same city, in the United States.
1796	Norwich Bulletin	English	Norwich, Connecticut	United States	Still published
1799	The Keene Sentinel	English	Keene, New Hampshire	United States	Still published
1799	The Star Democrat	English	Easton, Maryland	United States	Still published
1801	New York Post	English	New York City	United States	Still published
1801	Williamsport Sun-Gazette	English-language	Williamsport, Pennsylvania	United States	Still published
1803	The Post and Courier	English	Charleston, South Carolina	United States	Still published
1807	The Southern Star	English/Spanish	Montevideo	Uruguay	Defunct; first paper in Uruguay
1808	Observer-Reporter	English	Washington, Pennsylvania	United States	Still published
1808	Gazeta de Caracas	Spanish	Caracas	Venezuela	First newspaper of Venezuela. Later changed for Correo del Orinoco
1810	Gazeta de Buenos Ayres	Spanish	Buenos Aires	Argentina	Defunct. First newspaper of the country.
1812	Aurora de Chile	Spanish	Santiago de Chile	Chile	Defunct. First newspaper of the country.
1813	The Political Censor	English	Clermont, Ohio	United States	Defunct.
1815	The Ithaca Journal	English	Ithaca, New York	United States	Still published. Originally named the Seneca Republican.
1815	The Repository	English	Canton, Ohio	United States	Still published. Began as a weekly, The Ohio Repository.
1822	Sandusky Register	English	Sandusky, Ohio	United States	Still Published. Originally named the Sandusky Clarion.
1825	El Peruano	Spanish	Lima	Peru	Still published
1825	Diário de Pernambuco	Portuguese	Recife	Brazil	Still published. Oldest continuously circulating daily newspaper in Latin America and oldest continuously circulating periodical edited in Portuguese.
1825	The Monroe News	English	Monroe, Michigan	United States	Still published. The same paper has been through several name changes in its history but remains the same print product. Today, the Monroe Publishing Company is among the 10 largest employers in Monroe, Michigan.
1826	Honduras Gazette	English	Belize	Belize	Defunct. First newspaper of the country.
1827	El Mercurio de Valparaíso	Spanish	Valparaíso, Valparaíso	Chile	Still published. Oldest continuously circulating periodical, published under the same name, in Spanish.
1827	Jornal do Commercio	Portuguese	Rio de Janeiro, Rio de Janeiro	Brazil	Defunct since 2016.
1828	The Royal Gazette	English	Hamilton, Bermuda	Bermuda	Still published continuously since 1828. There were earlier versions under different owners.
1829	The Providence Journal	English	Providence, Rhode Island	United States	Still published. Oldest continuously published daily newspaper in U.S.
1829	The Philadelphia Inquirer	English	Philadelphia	United States	Still published
1829	The Post-Standard	English	Syracuse, New York	United States	Still published
1829	The Pilot	English	Boston, Massachusetts	United States	Still published
1831	Detroit Free Press	English	Detroit, Michigan	United States	Still published
1831	The State Journal-Register	English	Springfield, Illinois	United States	Still published. Founded as Sangamo Journal; underwent several name changes, Illinois State Journal by 1848; merged with Illinois State Register in 1974
1833	Democrat and Chronicle	English	Rochester, New York	United States	Still published. Founded in 1833 as The Balance, the paper eventually became known as the Daily Democrat. The Daily Democrat merged with another local paper, the Chronicle, in 1870, to become known as the Democrat and Chronicle. The paper was purchased by Gannett in 1928.
1834	The Gleaner	English	Kingston, Jamaica	Jamaica	Still published
1835	The Toledo Blade	English	Toledo, Ohio	United States	Still published
1836	The Telegraph	English	Alton, Illinois	United States	Still published. Founded as Alton Telegraph, subsequently known as Alton Daily Telegraph and Alton Evening Telegraph.
1837	The Picayune	English	New Orleans	United States	Still published as The Times Picayune. Has gone through several name changes over the years as The Picayune merged with other local papers.
1839	El Comercio	Spanish	Lima	Peru	Still published
1840	The Cincinnati Enquirer	English	Cincinnati	United States	Still published
1841	The Cecil Whig	English	Elkton, Maryland	United States	Still published
1842	The Galveston Daily News	English	Galveston, Texas	United States	Still Published
1842	The Plain Dealer	English	Cleveland, Ohio	United States	Still published
1844	The Globe and Mail	English	Toronto	Canada	Still published
1844	The Nassau Guardian	English	Nassau	The Bahamas	Still published
1845	The Stanstead Journal	English	Stanstead, Quebec	Canada	Defunct as of 2019
1845	Ottawa Citizen	English	Ottawa	Canada	Still published
1846	Boston Herald	English	Boston, Massachusetts	United States	Still published
1846	The Hamilton Spectator	English	Hamilton, Ontario	Canada	Still published
1846	The Victoria Advocate	English	Victoria, Texas	United States	Still published
1846	Vineyard Gazette	English	Edgartown, Massachusetts	United States	Still published
1847	Chicago Tribune	English	Chicago	United States	Still published
1848	The Daily Standard	English	Celina, Ohio	United States	Still published
1849	The London Free Press	English	London, Ontario	Canada	Still published.
1849	The Santa Fe New Mexican	English	Santa Fe, New Mexico	United States	Still published.
1850	Deseret News	English	Salt Lake City, Utah	United States	Still published. The newspaper's $61 second-hand Ramage press was procured in 1847 in Boston and arrived in the Salt Lake Valley by ox-drawn wagons in August 1849.
1850	The Oregonian	English	Portland, Oregon	United States	Still published.
1851	The New York Times	English	New York City	United States	Still published
1851	Placerville Mountain Democrat	English	Placerville, California	United States	Still published
1852	The Wheeling Intelligencer	English	Wheeling, West Virginia	United States	Still published
1852	The Casket	English (Formerly Gaelic)	Antigonish, Nova Scotia	Canada	Still published
1853	Guelph Mercury	English	Guelph, Ontario	Canada	Defunct circa 2016
1853	La Estrella de Panamá	Spanish	Panama City	Panama	Still published
1854	The Union Democrat	English	Sonora, California	United States	Still published
1854	The Daily Citizen	English	Searcy	Arkansas	Still published
1857	The Sacramento Bee	English	Sacramento, California	United States	Still published
1858	Belleville News-Democrat	English	Belleville, Illinois	United States	Still published. Founded as Weekly Democrat, merged with Belleville News in 1883
1859	Rocky Mountain News	English	Denver, Colorado	United States	Published from 23 April 1859 to 27 February 2009.
1861	Buenos Aires Standard	English	Buenos Aires	Argentina	Defunct
1862	Telegraph-Journal	English	Saint John, New Brunswick	Canada	Still published
1864	The Marietta Times	English	Marietta, Ohio	United States	Still published
1865	San Antonio Express-News	English	San Antonio, Texas	United States	Still Published
1865	San Francisco Chronicle	English	San Francisco	United States	Still Published
1866	Belton Journal	English	Belton, Texas	United States	Still published. Renamed The Journal-Reporter in 1898, The Belton Journal and Bell County Democrat in 1919, and returned to The Belton Journal in 1982.
1867	La Capital	Spanish	Rosario	Argentina	Still published. Oldest Argentine newspaper still in circulation.
1867	The Spencer Magnet	English	Taylorsville, Kentucky	United States	Still published
1868	The Atlanta Journal-Constitution	English	Atlanta	United States	Still published
1868	The Dalhousie Gazette	English	Halifax, Nova Scotia	Canada	Still published
1868	Times & Transcript	English	Moncton, New Brunswick	Canada	Still published
1869	La Prensa	Spanish	Buenos Aires	Argentina	Still published
1870	The Belleville Telescope	English	Belleville, Kansas	United States	Still published
1870	La Nación	Spanish	Buenos Aires	Argentina	Still published
1870	La Discusión	Spanish	Chillán, Ñuble	Chile	Still published
1870	The Guardian	English	Charlottetown, Prince Edward Island	Canada	Still published
1870	Tucson Citizen	English	Tucson, Arizona	United States	Newsprint publication ceased May 16, 2009.
1871	Parsons Sun	English	Parsons, Kansas	United States	Still Published
1871	The Salt Lake Tribune	English	Salt Lake City, Utah	United States	Still published
1872	The Boston Globe	English	Boston, Massachusetts	United States	Still published
1873	The Belleville Telescope	English	Belleville, Kansas	United States	Still published
1874	Nanaimo Daily News	English	Nanaimo, British Columbia	Canada	Still published
1874	The Chronicle Herald	English	Halifax, Nova Scotia	Canada	Still published
1874	Daily Washington Law Reporter	English	Baltimore, Maryland	United States	Still published
1875	Estado de São Paulo	Portuguese	São Paulo	Brazil	Still published.
1875	The Southern Cross	Spanish, English	Buenos Aires	Argentina	Still published. Monthly
1876	Orlando Sentinel	English	Orlando	United States	Still Published
1876	Buenos Aires Herald	English	Buenos Aires	Argentina	Defunct
1876	Diario Oficial de la República de Chile	Spanish	Santiago de Chile	Chile	Still published
1877	The Washington Post	English	Washington, D.C.	United States	Still published
1877	The Newtown Bee	English	Newtown, Connecticut	United States	Still published.
1878	St. Louis Post-Dispatch	English	St. Louis, Missouri	United States	Still published
1878	The Exonian	English	Exeter, New Hampshire	United States	Still published. Oldest continuously running preparatory school newspaper in America.
1878	Waterloo Region Record	English	Kitchener, Ontario	Canada	Still published
1879	The Telegram	English	Saint John's, Newfoundland and Labrador	Canada	Still published
1879	Times Leader	English	Wilkes-Barre, Pennsylvania	United States	Still published
1880	Albuquerque Journal	English	Albuquerque, New Mexico	United States	Still published
1880	The Kansas City Star	English	Kansas City, Missouri	United States	Still published
1881	El Paso Times	English	El Paso, Texas	United States	Still published
1881	El Paso Herald-Post	English	El Paso, Texas	United States	1881–1997
1881	Las Cruces Sun-News	English	Las Cruces, New Mexico	United States	Still published
1881	Los Angeles Times	English	Los Angeles, California	United States	Still published
1882	El Sur	Spanish	Concepción, Bío Bío	Chile	Still published
1882	The Brandon Sun	English	Brandon, Manitoba	Canada	Still published
1883	Calgary Herald	English	Calgary, Alberta	Canada	Still published
1883	Los Andes	Spanish	Mendoza	Argentina	Still published
1883	Regina Leader-Post	English	Regina, Saskatchewan	Canada	Still published
1883	Amigoe	Dutch	Dutch Caribbean	Kingdom of the Netherlands	Still published
1884	El Día	Spanish	La Plata	Argentina	Still published
1884	La Presse	French	Montreal, Quebec	Canada	Still published
1884	Times Colonist	English	Victoria, British Columbia	Canada	Still published
1884	The Altamont Enterprise	English	Altamont, New York	United States	Still published
1885	El Llanquihue	Spanish	Puerto Montt, Los Lagos	Chile	Still published
1885	Omaha World-Herald	English	Omaha, Nebraska	United States	Still published
1886	Lögberg-Heimskringla	English	Winnipeg, Manitoba	Canada	Still published. English and formerly Icelandic
1886	El Día	Spanish	Montevideo	Uruguay	Defunct
1886	La Prensa	Spanish	Curicó, Maule	Chile	Temporarily ceased publication 1886–98. Still in publication since then.
1887	O Taquaryense	Portuguese	Taquari	Brazil	Still published. The last newspaper in Latin America to still use Linotype typesetting and letterpress printing.
1887	El Espectador	Spanish	Bogotá	Colombia	Founded on Medellín on 22 March 1887, moved to Bogotá in 1915. Still published.
1888	The Windsor Star	English	Windsor, Ontario	Canada	Still published
1889	Moose Jaw Times-Herald	English	Moose Jaw, Saskatchewan	Canada	Still published
1889	Bangor Daily News	English	Bangor, Maine	United States	Still published.
1889	Listín Diario	Spanish	Santo Domingo	Dominican Republic	Still published.
1889	The Wall Street Journal	English	New York	United States	Still published.
1891	Jornal do Brasil	Portuguese	Rio de Janeiro, Rio de Janeiro	Brazil	Still published.
1891	Truro Daily News	English	Truro, Nova Scotia	Canada	Still published
1891	The Chilliwack Progress	English	Chilliwack, British Columbia	Canada	Still published
1892	The Denver Post	English	Denver, Colorado	United States	Still published
1893	Svoboda	Ukrainian	New Jersey	United States	Still published
1893	The Wave	English	Rockaway Beach, New York	United States	Still published
1895	Correio do Povo	Portuguese	Porto Alegre, Rio Grande do Sul	Brazil	Still published. Stopped publishing in 1984 and resumed in 1986.
1896	Bluefield Daily Telegraph	English	Bluefield, West Virginia	United States	Still published
1896	Silver City Daily Press and Independent	English	Silver City, New Mexico	United States	Still published
1896	Le Soleil	French	Quebec City, Quebec	Canada	Still published
1898	La Nueva Provincia	Spanish	Bahía Blanca	Argentina	Still published
1898	El Liberal	Spanish	Santiago del Estero	Argentina	Still published
1898	The Province	English	Vancouver, British Columbia	Canada	Still published
1898	Le Nouvelliste	French	Port-au-Prince	Haiti	Still Published
1892	Toronto Star	English	Toronto	Canada	Still Published. Originally known as the Evening Star, and then the Toronto Daily Star.
1900	Organized Labor	English	San Francisco	United States	First issue was printed on February 3, 1900, and published as a weekly, serving as the official organ of the Building Trades Council of San Francisco and the State Building Trades Council of California. Now published monthly.
1900	Northwest Labor Press	English	Portland	United States	Still published. Formerly known as Portland Labor Press from 1900 to 1915, the Oregon Labor Press until 1986, and the Oregon/Washington Labor Press until 1987.
1903	Rafu Shimpo	Japanese/English	Los Angeles	United States	Still published. Oldest Japanese language newspaper in the United States. An English section began in 1926. The newspaper temporarily ceased publication during the Japanese Internment.

=== Africa ===
The French established the first newspaper in Africa in Mauritius in 1773.

Date	Newspaper	Language	Place	Country/Region	Notes
1773	Annonces, Affiches et Avis Divers pour les Colonies des Isles de France et de Bourbon	French	Isle de France	Mauritius	First newspaper in Mauritius. Published weekly from 1773-01-13 to at least 1790 by Nicolas Lambert in Mauritius.
1800	Cape Town Gazette and African Advertiser	English, Afrikaans	Cape Town	British South Africa	First newspaper in South Africa. Published weekly from 1800-08-16 to at least 1829 by the British Government in South Africa.
1824	South African Commercial Advertiser	English, Afrikaans	Cape Town	British South Africa	First privately run newspaper in South Africa. Numbers 1 to 18 were published weekly from 7 January 1824 to 10 May 1824. numbers 19 to 135 were printed from 31 August 1825 to 10 March 1827 and numbers 136 and onward were printed from 1828 to 1853. Originally edited by the printer George Greig who soon relinquished editing control to Thomas Pringle and John Fairbairn. Pringle left the paper after number 19.
1824	South African Journal	English	Cape Town	British South Africa	A bimonthly journal edited by Thomas Pringle and John Fairbairn. Published from 1824-03-05 to 1824-05-07.
1824	Nederduitsche Zuid-Afrikaanse Tydschrift	Dutch	Cape Town	British South Africa	A bimonthly journal edited by Reverend Abraham Faure. It was the Dutch partner to the South African Journal. Published from 1824-04-04.
1824	The South African Chronicle and Mercantile Advertiser	English, Afrikaans	Cape Town	British South Africa	Printed weekly from 1824-08-18 to 1826-12-26. Printed by William Bridekirk and edited by A. J. Jardine.
1826	The New Organ	English, Dutch	Cape Town	British South Africa	Only one edition printed on 1826-01-06. Printed by George Greig and edited by John Fairbairn.
1827	De Versamelaar	English, Dutch	Cape Town	British South Africa	Printed weekly from 1827-01-07 until between 1829-01-27 to 1835. Edited by J. Duasso de Lima and printed by William Bridekirk.
1827	The Colonist	English, Dutch	Cape Town	British South Africa	Printed weekly from 1827-11-22 to 1828-09-30 by William Bridekirk and then George Greig and edited by William Beddy.
1828	Al-Waqa'i' al-Masriyya	Turkish, Arabic	Cairo	Egypt	First Turkish newspaper. Still published
1830	De Zuid-Afrikaan	Dutch	Cape Town	British South Africa	Initially a weekly paper, then at more frequent intervals. First issue 9 April 1830. Last issue 8 April 1930
1859	Iwe Irohin	Yoruba, English	Abeokuta	Nigeria	Founded on December 3, 1859. It was published bi-weekly, in Yoruba and English language and ran for about eight years, specifically from 1859 to 1867.
1875	Al-Ahram	Arabic	Cairo	Egypt	Still published
1889	Al-Maghrib	Arabic	Rabat	Morocco	First newspaper in the Maghreb
1891	Mashonaland Herald and Zambesian Times	English	Salisbury	Southern Rhodesia	Now published as The Herald
1898	Kurdistan	Kurdish	Cairo	Egypt	First newspaper in the Kurmanji Kurdish language, founded by Miqdad Madhad Bedirkhan, member of the Kurdish aristocrat Bedirkhan family. The first issue was printed in Cairo on April 22, 1898. April 22 marks Kurdish Journalism Day to celebrate this.

=== South Asia ===
The first recorded attempt to found a newspaper in South Asia was by William Bolts, a Dutchman in the employ of the British East India Company in September 1768 in Calcutta. The Company deported Bolts back to Europe before he could begin his newspaper.

Date	Newspaper	Language	Place	Country/Region	Notes
1780	Hicky's Bengal Gazette or, The Original Calcutta General Advertiser	English	Calcutta	Company's India	First newspaper in South Asia. Published weekly from 29 January 1780 to 23 March 1782 when James Augustus Hicky's types were seized.
1780	The India Gazette or Calcutta Public Advertiser	English	Calcutta	Company's India	Second newspaper in South Asia. Published weekly from 1780-11-18. Survived until 1834. Published by Peter Reed (until 1781), Bernard Messink (until 1793), G. Gordon (1793 to before 1799) In 1799, its proprietors were William Morris, William Fairlie and J. D. Williams.
1784	Calcutta Gazette	English	Calcutta	Company's India	Third newspaper in South Asia. Government sanctioned. Published weekly from 1784-03-04 to 1818-09-29. Its proprietors were Francis Gladwin, an East India Company Officer until January 1787 and Arthur Muir, Herbert Harrington and Edmond Morris afterwards.
1785	Bengal Journal	English	Calcutta	Company's India	Published weekly from 1785–02 to 1791. Its proprietors were William Duane and Thomas Jones.
1785	The Oriental Magazine or Calcutta Amusement	English	Calcutta	Company's India	Published monthly from 1785-04-06. Its proprietors were Gordon and John Hay. It ceased publication sometime prior to 1799–05, when Governor-General Wellesley enacted press regulations.
1785	The Asiatick Miscellany	English	Calcutta	Company's India	Published quarterly from 1785-07-14 to 1789–01. Its proprietor was Francis Gladwin.
1785	Madras Courier	English	Madras	Company's India	Published weekly at first from 1785-10-12 to around 1818, with government sanction. Its proprietor was Richard Johnson.
1786	Calcutta Chronicle and General Advertiser	English	Calcutta	Company's India	Published weekly from 1786–01 to either 1790 or 1797. Its proprietor was William Baillie.
1788	The Asiatic Mirror and Commercial Advertiser	English	Calcutta	Company's India	Published weekly at first from 1788–02 to 1820–05. Its proprietors were C.K. Bruce and Dr. Shoolbred.
1789	Bombay Herald	English	Bombay	Company's India	Published weekly from 1789 to 1792. Its proprietors are unknown.
1794	Azdarar	Armenian	Madras	Company's India	Published from 1794 to 1796. It was the first Armenian newspaper, its proprietor was Harutyun Shmavonyan.
1795	Madras Gazette	English	Madras	Company's India	Published weekly from January 1795. Its proprietor was Robert Williams.
1795	India Herald	English	Madras	Company's India	Published from April 1795. Its proprietor was G Humphrey.
1802	The Ceylon Government Gazette	English	Colombo	British Ceylon	The first issue of the Ceylon Gazette appeared on 15 March 1802. It was printed by Frans de Bruin at the renovated press built in 1737 by the Dutch in Ceylon.
1816	The Asiatic Journal and Monthly Miscellany	English		Company's India	The journal was sponsored by the East India Company, and was designed to record and share information relating to India and the East India Company.
1818	Samachar Darpan	Bengali	Frederiknagore	Danish India	It was a Bengali weekly newspaper published by the Baptist Missionary Society from the Baptist Mission Press at Serampore in the first half of the 19th century. It is considered to be the first Indian-language newspaper.
1821	Sambad Kaumudi	Bengali	Calcutta	Company's India	It was founded by Ram Mohan Roy and was published first half of the 19th century.
1822	Bombay Samachar	Gujarati	Bombay	Company's India	Still published. Originally called Moombaina Samachar. It is the oldest newspaper in India still in circulation.
1822	Jam-i-Jahan-Numa	Urdu	Calcutta	Company's India	First newspaper in Urdu.
1822	Samachar Chandrika	Bengali	Calcutta	Company's India	A weekly newspaper founded by Bhabani Charan Bandyopadhyay became the newspaper of the Dharma Sabha and campaigned against social reforms including the ban on Sati.
1826	Udant Martand	Hindi	Calcutta	Company's India	It was published from Calcutta by Pandit Jugal Kishore Shukla.
1832	Darpan	Marathi	Bombay	Company's India	First newspaper in Marathi. Editor was Balshastri Jambhekar. The newspaper was printed both in English and Marathi languages in two separate columns.
1832	The Colombo Journal	English	Colombo	British Ceylon	The newspaper started on 1 January 1832 with George Lee as editor. George Lee was the Superintendent of the Government Press and later Postmaster General.
1834	The Ceylon Observer	English	Colombo	British Ceylon	It was founded in 1834 as The Observer and Commercial Advertiser and was published from Colombo. It ceased publication in 1982.
1834	Sunday Observer	English	Colombo	British Ceylon	This paper, first published on 4 February 1834, was edited by E. J. Darley and George Winter.
1838	The Times of India	English	Bombay	Company's India	Still published. Originally called The Bombay Times and Journal of Commerce. It is the oldest English Language newspaper in India still in circulation.
1843	Mangaluru Samachara	Kannada	Mangalore	Company's India	First Kannada language newspaper. It was produced by a German, Rev. Hermann Friedrich Mögling of the Basel Mission.
1846	Orunodoi	Assamese	Sivasagar	Company's India	It started in January, 1846 by an American missionary Dr. Nathan Brown and printed and published at the Sibsagar Mission Press by O.T Cutter, was the first newspaper in Assam as well as the first newspaper in Assamese.
1846	The Times of Ceylon	English	Colombo	British Ceylon	It was founded in 1846 as the Ceylon Times and was published from Colombo. It ceased publication in 1985.
1847	Rangapur Bartabaha	Bengali	Rangpur	Company's India	It was first published in August 1847 (Bhadra, 1254 BS) and continued publication up to 1854 without any major interruption.
1849	Lahore Chronicle	English	Lahore	Company's India	It founded by Syed Muhammad Azim. It is first newspaper in Modern Pakistan.
1853	Hindoo Patriot	English	Calcutta	Company's India	It was first published on 6 January 1853 by Madhusudan Ray, under the editorship of Girish Chandra Ghosh.
1854	Rast Goftar	Gujarati	Bombay	Company's India	It was started in 1854 by Dadabhai Naoroji and Kharshedji Cama.
1862	The Bengalee	English	Calcutta	British India	It was founded in 1862 by Girish Chandra Ghosh. It was closed down in 1931. In 1932, the two editions were consolidated and renamed The Star of India.
1863	Gujarat Mitra	Gujarati	Surat	British India	Still published.
1865	The Pioneer	English	Allahabad	British India	Still published. Founded by George Allen as a weekly then became a daily.
1866	Utkala Deepika	Odia	Orissa	British India	First Odia language newspaper. The weekly paper was started on 4 August 1866 by Gourishankar Ray and Babu Bichitrananda Das.
1867	The Madras Mail	English	Madras	British India	Started by Charles Lawson and Henry Cornish.It was closed in 1981 and was the first evening newspaper in India.
1868	Amrita Bazar Patrika	Bengali	Jessore	British India	The paper discontinued its publication in 1991 after 123 years of publication.
1872	Civil and Military Gazette	English	Lahore, Simla	British India	It was founded in Lahore and Simla in 1872. It was a merger of The Mofussilite in Calcutta, and the Lahore Chronicle and Indian Public Opinion and Panjab Times in Lahore.
1875	The Statesman	English	Calcutta, Bombay	British India	Still published. It is a direct descendant of two newspapers, the Bombay (now Mumbai) based Indian Statesman and The Friend of India published in Calcutta (now Kolkata). Indian Statesman was started by Robert Knight, who was previously the principal founder and editor of The Times of India.
1875	Burma Gazette	Burmese	Burma	British India	It was introduced by the British, and was used to issue circulars and vernacular acts. It was first published on 2 January 1875.
1878	The Hindu	English	Madras	British India	Still published. It was founded in Madras on 20 September 1878 as a weekly newspaper, by what was known then as the Triplicane Six consisting of 4 law students and 2 teachers.
1878	Salem Desabhimani	Tamil	Madras Presidency	British India	One of first Tamil newspapers.
1880	Coimbatore Kalanidhi	Tamil	Coimbatore	British India	One of first Tamil newspapers.
1880	The Illustrated Weekly of India	English	Bombay	British India	It started publication in 1880 as Times of India Weekly Edition. It closed down on 13 November 1993.
1881	The Tribune	English	Lahore	British India	Still published. It was founded on 2 February 1881, in Lahore (now in Pakistan), by Sardar Dyal Singh Majithia, a philanthropist, and is run by a trust comprising five persons as trustees.
1881	Kesari	Marathi	Poona	British India	Still published. It was founded on 4 January 1881 by Lokmanya Bal Gangadhar Tilak, a prominent leader of the Indian Independence movement.
1882	Swadesamitran	Tamil	Madras	British India	It was founded by G. Subramania Aiyer who also served as the first editor.
1884	Sind Sudhar	Sindhi	Sind	British India	Oldest Sindhi language newspaper. Initially published by Education department of Sindh was taken out later by Sindh Saba. Sadhu Hiranand was its first editor from 1884 to 1887.
1886	Khalsa Akhbar	Punjabi	Lahore	British India	First Punjabi language newspaper. It was a weekly newspaper and the organ of the Lahore Khalsa Diwan, a Sikh society.
1887	Deepika	Malayalam	Kottayam	British India	Still published. Oldest Malayalam language newspaper.
1888	Sudharak	Marathi	Poona	British India	It was founded by Gopal Ganesh Agarkar.
1888	Malayala Manorama	Malayalam	Kottayam	British India	Still published. It was first published as a weekly on 22 March 1888.
1898	The Kohinoor	Bengali	Kushtia	British India	It started publication in July 1898 in Kushtia District after Rowshan Ali Chowdhury met Mir Mosharraf Hossain.
1900	O Heraldo	Portuguese	Pangim	Portuguese India	Still published. It was established as the first daily Portuguese newspaper on 21 May 1900 by Aleixo Clemente Messias Gomes in Goa.
1901	Gorkhapatra	Nepali	Kathmandu	Kingdom of Nepal	Still published. It is the oldest state-owned national daily newspaper of Nepal. It was started as a weekly newspaper in May 1901 and became a daily newspaper in 1961.

=== Oceania ===
Date	Newspaper	Language	Place	Country/Region	Notes
1803	Sydney Gazette	English	Sydney	Australia	Was the first newspaper in Australia Published weekly from 1803 to 1842
1831	The Sydney Morning Herald	English	Sydney	Australia	Is the oldest continuously published newspaper in Australia, originally called the Sydney Herald
1833	The West Australian	English	Perth	Australia	Second oldest continuously operated newspaper in Australia
1838	Melbourne Advertiser	English	Melbourne	Australia	Originally called Port Phillip Patriot and Melbourne Advertiser
1840	Herald Sun	English	Melbourne	Australia	Originally called The Port Phillip Herald
1840	New Zealand Gazette	English	Wellington	New Zealand	First newspaper published in New Zealand. Publication ceased in 1844. Not to be confused with the government publication of the same name
1840	The Geelong Advertiser	English	Melbourne	Australia	Still in publication under the original title.
1846	The Courier Mail	English	Brisbane	Australia	Originally called The Moreton Bay Courier
1852	Taranaki Herald	English	New Plymouth	New Zealand	Was New Zealand's oldest surviving newspaper until it ceased publication in 1989.
1854	The Age	English	Melbourne	Australia	Owned by Fairfax Media who also own Sydney Morning Herald
1856	Wanganui Chronicle	English	Wanganui	New Zealand	New Zealand's oldest surviving newspaper
1859	The Advertiser	English	Adelaide	Australia	Originally the South Australian Advertiser
1861	The Press	English	Christchurch	New Zealand	New Zealand's 2nd oldest surviving newspaper
1861	Otago Daily Times	English	Dunedin	New Zealand	New Zealand's third oldest surviving newspaper and oldest surviving daily newspaper
1869	The Fiji Times	English	Levuka	Fiji	The oldest newspaper in Fiji still operating.
1891	Lloyd's List Australia	English	Sydney	Australia	The oldest continuously published national newspaper in Australia

=== East Asia ===
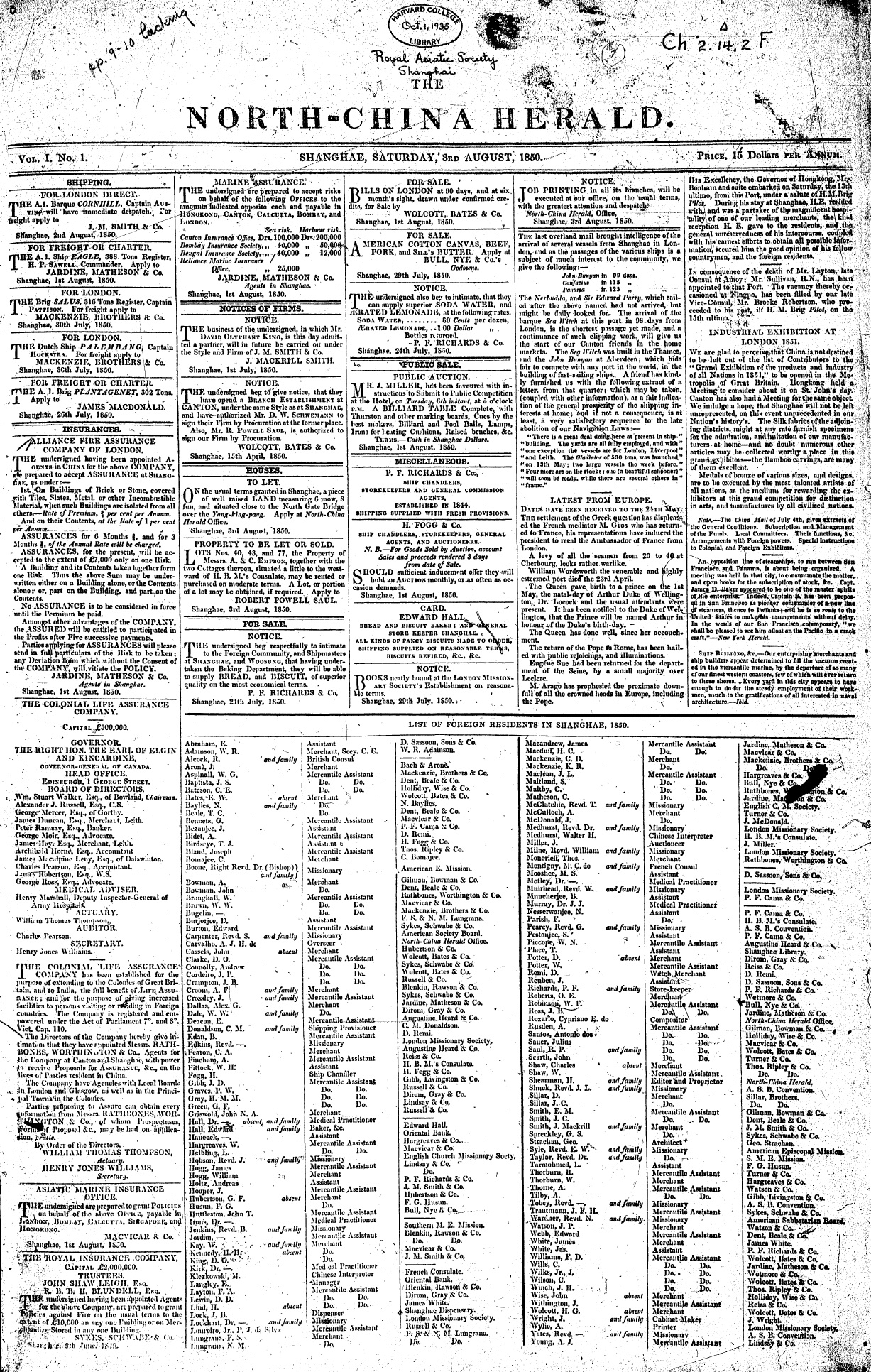
Inaugural issue of the North China Herald, August 3, 1850.

Date	Newspaper	Language	Place	Country/Region	Notes
1744	Bataviase Nouvelles en Politique Raisonnementes	Dutch	Batavia	Dutch East India Company	First newspaper in present-day Indonesia, ceased publication in 1746.
1806	The Prince of Wales Island Gazette	English	Penang	British Malaya	First newspaper in Southeast Asia; last issue rolled off the press on 7 July 1827; weekly edition survived until January 1830.
1811	Del Superior Govierno	Spanish	Manila	Spanish East Indies	Oldest newspaper in the Philippines, oldest Spanish language newspaper in Asia; first published on August 8, 1811, ceased publication on February 7, 1812.
1812	Java Government Gazette	English	Batavia	Dutch East Indies	Published during British administration in Dutch East Indies, ceased publication in 1816.
1844	The Bangkok Recorder	English/Thai	Bangkok	Siam	Country's first newspaper
1845	De Locomotief	Dutch	Semarang	Dutch East Indies	Originally Semarangsch Nieuws en Advertentieblad. Ceased publication in 1956.
1845	The China Mail	English	Victoria City	Hong Kong	The first newspaper published in the crown colony and the longest-lived of any Hong Kong newspaper. Published until 1974.
1845	The Straits Times	English	Singapore	Straits Settlements	Split into The Straits Times (based in Singapore) and The New Straits Times (based in Kuala Lumpur) after Singapore's separation from Malaysia in 1965.
1850	North China Herald (North China Daily News)	English	Shanghai	China	A weekly newspaper at first, it began daily publication in 1864 under the new name North China Daily News. Ceased publication in 1951.
1852	Java-Bode	Dutch	Batavia	Dutch East Indies	Ceased publication in 1957.
1853	Chinese serial	Chinese	Victoria City	Hong Kong	First Chinese-language newspaper in the crown colony. Ceased publication in 1856.
1853	Soerabaijasch Handelsblad	Dutch	Soerabaja	Dutch East Indies	Ceased publication in 1957.
1858	Royal Thai Government Gazette	Thai	Dusit, Bangkok	Siam	Country's first newspaper
1861	Nagasaki Shipping List and Advertiser	English	Nagasaki	Japan	Country's first newspaper
1862	Kwanpan Batavia Shinbun	Japanese	Tokyo	Japan	First Japanese-language newspaper. A month-by-month government translation of the Dutch Javasche Courant.
1865	Gia Dinh Bao	Vietnamese	Saigon	Đại Nam	Country's first newspaper
1868	Chugai Shinbun	Japanese	Tokyo	Japan	First Japanese-language newspaper with original reporting. Ceased with publisher's death in 1869.
1870	Yokohama Mainichi Shinbun	Japanese	Yokohama	Japan	First daily Japanese-language newspaper. Closed in 1940.
1872	Tokyo Nichi Nichi Shimbun	Japanese	Tokyo	Japan	Merged with Mainichi Shimbun which is still published
1881	Chōsen Shinpō	Japanese, Classical Chinese, one article in Korean	Pusan	Korea	The first newspaper in Korea, but mainly published in Japanese and Chinese.
1883 (1886)	Hansŏng sunbo (Hansŏng jubo)	Chinese, Korean	Seoul	Korea	Hansŏng sunbo is the first native Korean newspaper, although it was written in Classical Chinese. Its successor, Hansŏng jubo was the first to be written in primarily Korean (mixed script).
1885	Bataviaasch Nieuwsblad	Dutch	Batavia	Dutch East Indies	Ceased publication in 1957.
1885	Taiwan Church News(Tâi-oân Kàu-hōe Kong-pò)	Taiwanese	Tâi-lâm-chiu	Tâi-oân	First newspaper in Taiwan.
1888	The Singapore Weekly Herald	English	Singapore	Straits Settlements	
1895	Taiwan Nichinichi Shimpō	Japanese	Taihoku	Japanese Taiwan	Called Taiwan Nichinichi Shimpo in most of the Japanese ruling period. Still published as Taiwan Shin Sheng Daily News.
1896	De Preangerbode	Dutch	Bandung	Dutch East Indies	Renamed Algemeen Indisch Dagblad de Preangerbode in 1923, ceased publication in 1957.
1898	The Manila Times	English	Manila	Captaincy General of the Philippines	Oldest extant English-language broadsheet in the Philippines still operating under its name.

== See also ==
- Lists of newspapers
- List of early-modern journals
- Kaiyuan Za Bao
