= Václav Matěj Kramerius =

Czech publisher, journalist and writer (1753–1808)

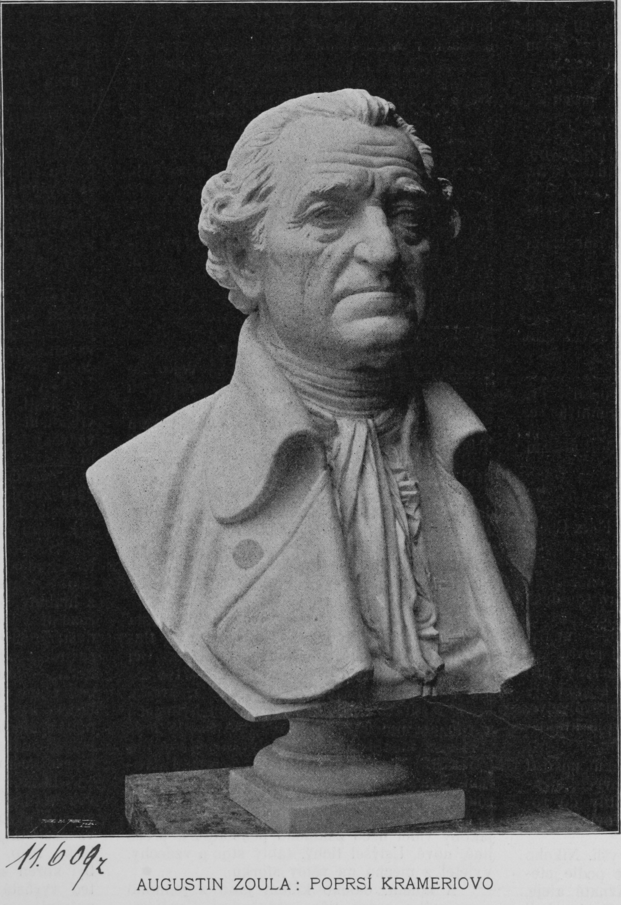
- Bust of Kramerius by Gustav Zoula (1899)
- Born: Matěj Valentin Kramerius; 9 February 1753; Klatovy, Bohemia, Habsburg monarchy
- Died: 22 March 1808 (aged 55); Prague, Bohemia, Austrian Empire
- Resting place: Olšany Cemetery, Prague
- Education: Charles University
- Occupation: Book publisher
- Known for: Founder of modern Czech journalism

Václav Matěj Kramerius (Czech pronunciation: [ˈvaːtslaf ˈmacɛj ˈkramɛrijus]; also written as Kraméryus; 9 February 1753 – 22 March 1808) was a Czech publisher, journalist and writer. He is considered the founder of modern Czech journalism. He was an early figure of the Czech National Revival.

== Biography ==
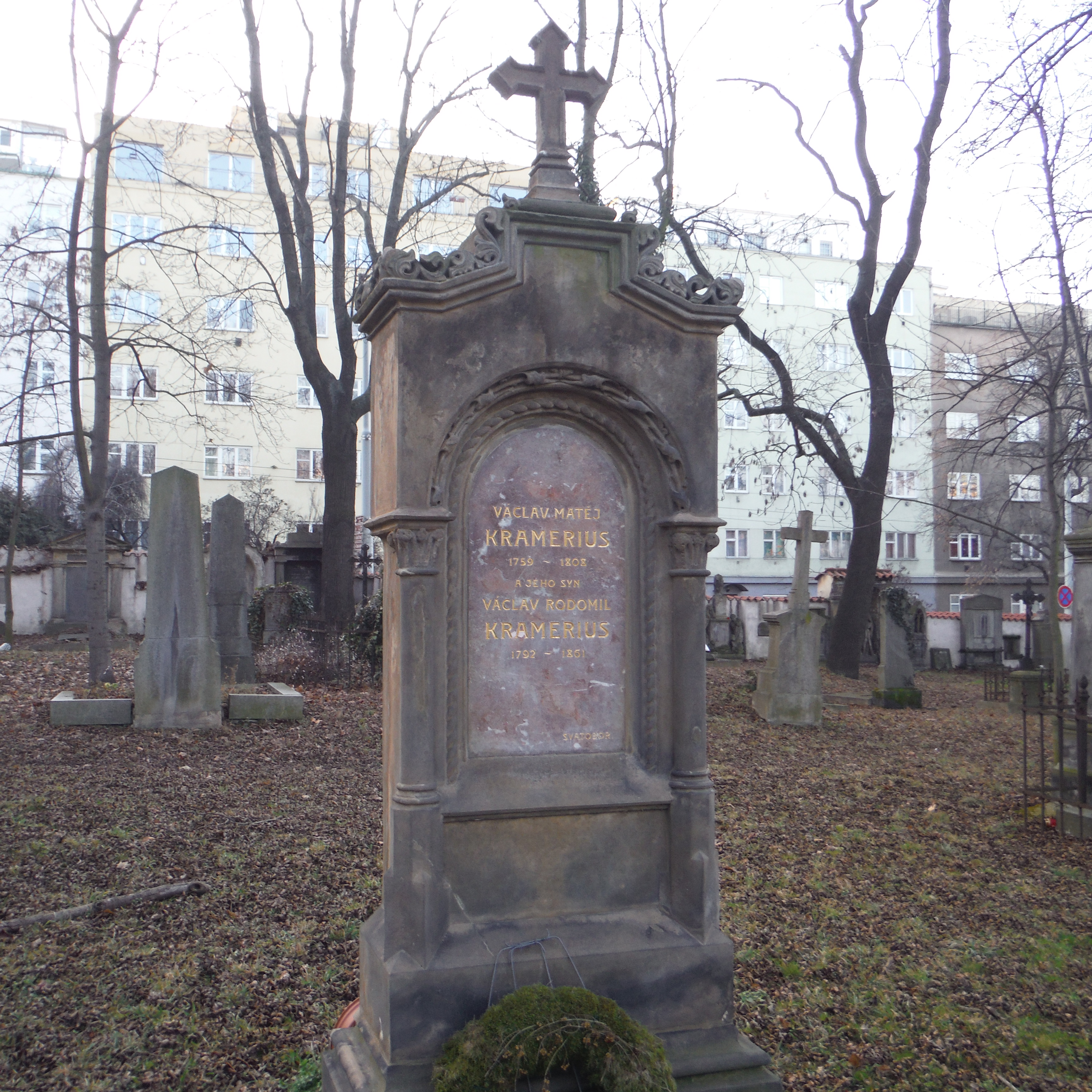
Grave of Václav Matěj Kramerius and his son at the Olšany Cemetery

=== Early life, education and journalism ===
Václav Matěj Kramerius was born as Matěj Valentin Kramerius on 9 February 1753 in Klatovy, Bohemia. He later adopted the typically Czech name Václav Matěj as a sign of patriotism. He went to the Jesuit high school in Klatovy and then studied philosophy and law at the Charles-Ferdinand University in Prague (1773–1778), where he met Josef Dobrovský. After his studies, he earned money by cataloguing the library of Knight Jan František of Neuberk. Thanks to Dobrovský and Neuberk, he got into the society of Czech patriots and it directed him towards revivalist and educational activities.

From 1786, Kramerius worked as a journalist in the only and oldest Czech language weekly newspaper Pražské poštovské noviny, owned by Knight Jan Ferdinand of Schönfeld, and gained considerable popularity and experience. In 1789, he quarreled with Schönfeld and left the newspaper, and in the same year he began publishing his own newspaper Krameriusovy c. k. Pražské poštovské noviny ("Kramerius' imperial–royal Prague postal newspaper"), renamed Krameriusovy c. k. vlastenecké noviny ("Kramerius' imperial–royal patriotic newspaper") in 1791. He published them regularly until his death. These newspapers became popular among the middle and lower social classes.

=== Publishing activities, later life and family ===
In 1790, Kramerius established a company called Česká expedice ('Czech expedition'). Its establishment was one of the most significant steps in the development of the Czech language and national awareness in the Czech lands. The development of the business was made possible by the dowry that Kramerius received after his marriage to Jenovéfa Hereciová in 1791. The enterprise combined a publishing house, a bookstore and an antiquarian bookshop. Newspapers, calendars, and fiction and educational books were published here. The publishing house published more than 90 titles, all in Czech language. Kramerius wanted to make his newspapers independent, but this caused him financial problems. Therefore, he also published low-quality fiction in his publishing house (e.g. ghost stories and knight stories) that sold well, so that he could use the money he earned to publish unprofitable books.

At the end of his life, he was no longer able to publish a newspaper due to lack of finances and died in poverty. He died on 22 March 1808 in Prague. He left his family with debts. After the death of Kramerius, in 1808–1820, Česká expedice was led by Kramerius' wife Jenovéfa (died 1829) and their first-born son Václav Rodomil (1792–1861). The ideological orientation of the company did not change, nor did the poor financial situation, which led to the gradual sale of the company in the 1820s. Václav Rodomil then continued in the spirit of his father's work with his own journalistic activities and writing.

== Writing work ==
Although Kramerius is known primarily as a journalist and publisher, he worked on book translation and language editing, and was also a writer of books published by his publishing house. His books addressed cultural-political, educational, and patriotic-revivalist issues. He tried to write simply and clearly. His books for youth were the most popular. His works include:

- Mladší Robinson – adventure
- Hrabě z Rožmberka – historical
- Vypsání cest po mořích – educational/adventure
- Způsoby, mrawy a mínění Činů a Kochin Činů – educational/adventure
- Kniha Josefova – educational/historical
- Zrcadlo šlechetnosti pro mládež českou – educational/moralizing
- Mravové šlechetných dítek – educational/moralizing
- Arabské pohádky – fairy tales
- Zazděná slečna – moralizing short story

== Honours and legacy ==
Kramerius is considered the founder of modern Czech journalism and a symbol of independent journalism. Since 2016, the Association of Independent Media has awarded the Kramerius Prize for Independent Journalism annually.

The digital library of the National Library of the Czech Republic (application for making digitised documents accessible) is called Kramerius in honour of Václav Matěj Kramerius.

Several cities and towns in the Czech Republic have a street named after Václav Matěj Kramerius, including Prague (Kunratice), Brno, Ostrava, Liberec, Olomouc and his native town of Klatovy.
