= Post- och Inrikes Tidningar =

Government gazette of Sweden

- Front page from a 19 January 2009 edition
- Type: Daily newspaper
- Format: Digital
- Owner: Svenska Akademien
- Publisher: Horace Engdahl
- Founded: 1645; 381 years ago
- Language: Swedish
- Headquarters: Stockholm, Sweden
- Website: www.poit.bolagsverket.se

Post- och Inrikes Tidningar (lit. 'Post and Domestic Times') or PoIT is the government newspaper and gazette of Sweden, and the country's official notification medium for announcements like bankruptcy declarations or auctions. The newspaper also carries advertising, the largest advertiser being the Swedish Patent and Registration Office.

It is the oldest currently published newspaper in the world, although as of the 1 January 2007 edition, it has switched over to an internet-only format. Four copies of each update to PoIT are still printed and archived at the National Library of Sweden, Lund University library and the Swedish Companies Registration Office.

== History and profile ==
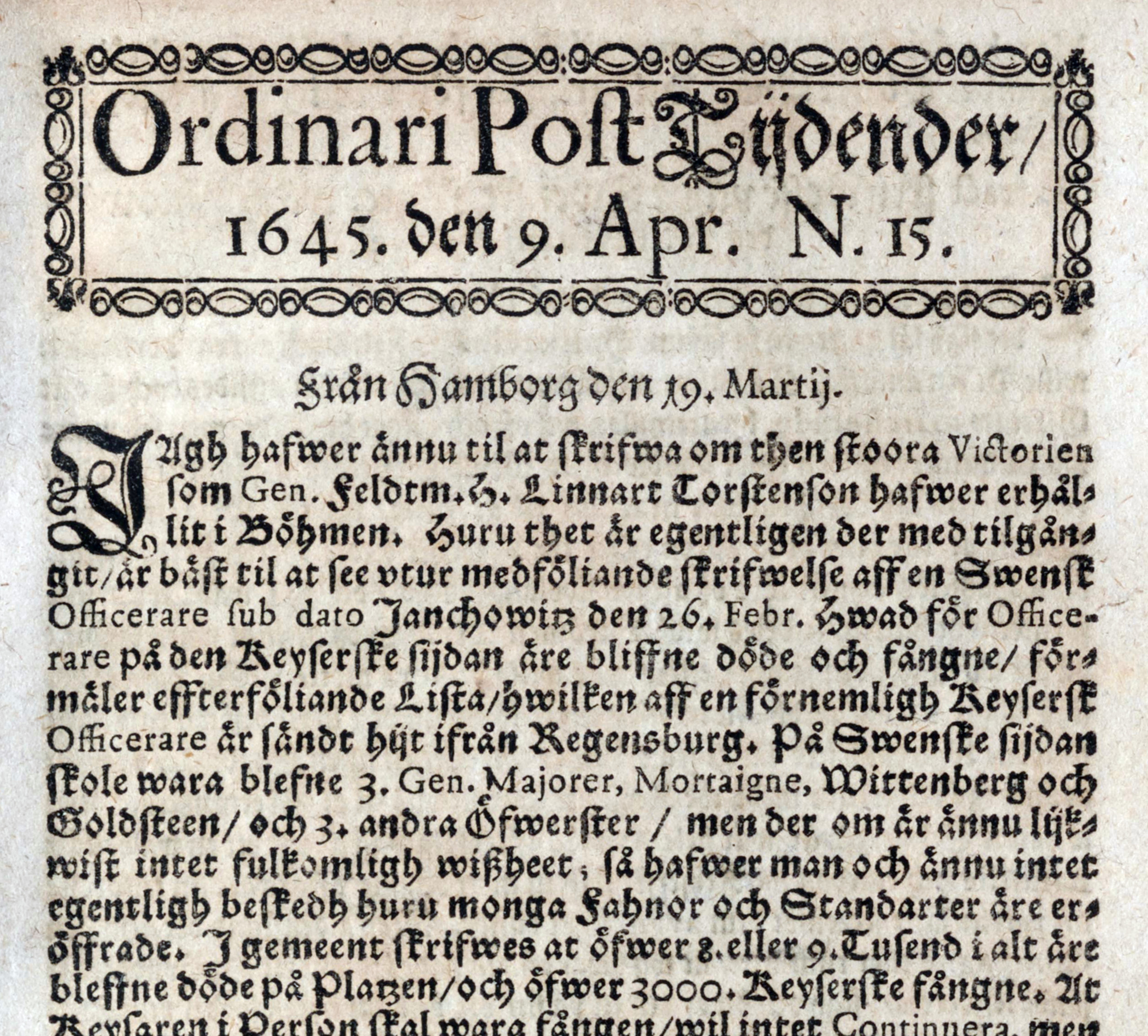
Post- och Inrikes Tidningar no. 15, 9 April 1645.

The newspaper was founded as the Ordinari Post Tijdender (lit. 'Regular Mail Times') in 1645 by Queen Christina and Chancellor Axel Oxenstierna. The paper was published weekly during early years. Nine years earlier, the royal postal agency (Kungliga Postverket) had been established and now all postmasters in the country were required to submit reports of information they heard, and the newspaper was then distributed to public notice boards throughout the country. In 1791, Gustav III designated the Swedish Academy to distribute and publish the newspaper, a practice that continues today. In 1821 it merged with the Inrikes Tidningar (lit. 'Domestic Times') to form the Post- och Inrikes Tidningar.

In the 17th and 18th centuries, it was the leading news source in the country, but by 1922, under competition from commercial papers, it had been reduced to publishing government, corporate, and legal announcements.

As of 2000, Post- och Inrikes Tidningar is published online at PointLex, and all editions from 1771 to 1860 are available at Project Tiden. The current director of the publication is Horace Engdahl, previously the permanent secretary of the Swedish Academy.

== See also ==
- List of newspapers by date
- Svensk författningssamling (SFS)
