= Johann Carolus =

German newspaper publisher (1575–1634)

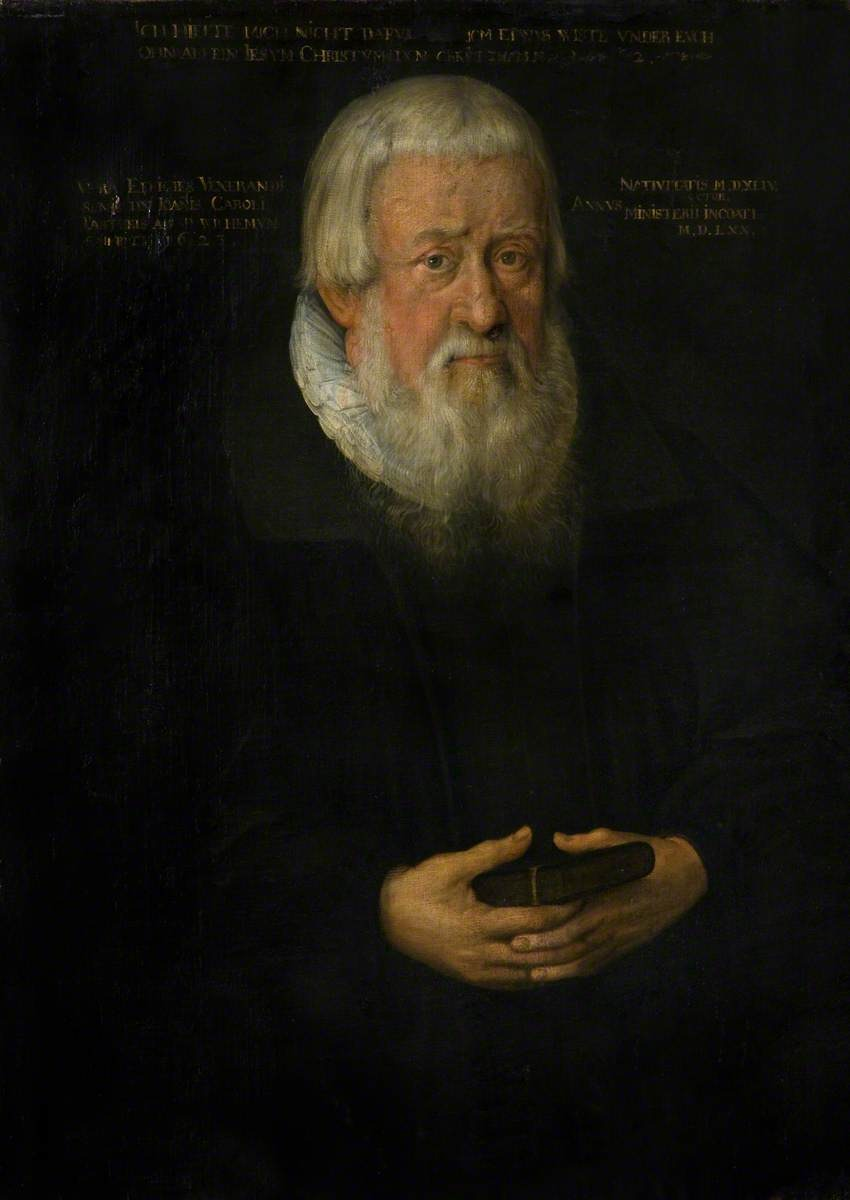
Portrait of Johann Carolus, 17th-century

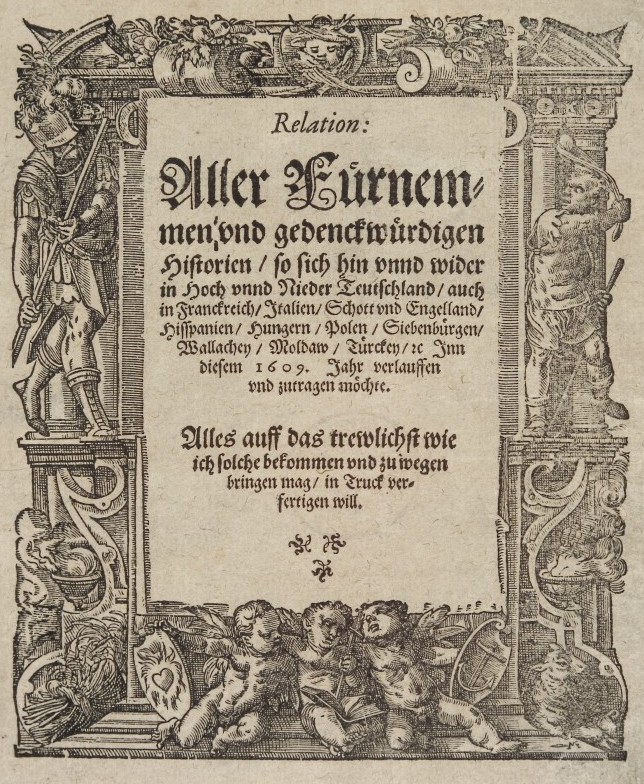
Title page of the Relation from 1609

Johann Carolus (26 March 1575 − 15 August 1634) was a German publisher of the first newspaper, called Relation aller Fürnemmen und gedenckwürdigen Historien (English: Account of all distinguished and commemorable stories). The Relation is recognised by the World Association of Newspapers, as well as many authors, as the world's first newspaper.

Carolus published the German-language newspaper in Strasbourg, which had the status of a free imperial city in the Holy Roman Empire and was largely German-speaking.

== Life ==
Johann Carolus was born in 1575 in Muhlbach-sur-Munster in the Holy Roman Empire. He was the son of a priest and his wife. He made an apprenticeship as a bookbinder and later worked as a bookseller, a scribe for a newspaper and as a printshop owner. Because of these professions, especially his job as scribe, he held good relationships to postmen and traders, what helped him later to create the Relation aller Fürnemmen und gedenckwürdigen Historien in 1605. Carolus died in 1634 in Strasbourg.

== Dates ==
In 2005, the World Association of Newspapers accepted evidence that the Carolus pamphlet was printed beginning in 1605, not 1609 as previously thought. The Carolus petition discovered in the Strasbourg Municipal Archive during the 1980s may be regarded as the birth certificate of the newspaper:

Whereas I have hitherto been in receipt of the weekly news advice [handwritten news reports] and, in recompense for some of the expenses incurred yearly, have informed yourselves every week regarding an annual allowance; Since, however, the copying has been slow and has necessarily taken much time, and since, moreover, I have recently purchased at a high and costly price the former printing workshop of the late Thomas Jobin and placed and installed the same in my house at no little expense, albeit only for the sake of gaining time, and since for several weeks, and now for the twelfth occasion, I have set, printed and published the said advice in my printing workshop, likewise not without much effort, inasmuch as on each occasion I have had to remove the formes from the presses …"

Soon the Relation was followed by other periodicals, such as, the Avisa Relation oder Zeitung.

If a newspaper is defined by the functional criteria of publicity, seriality, periodicity, and currency or actuality (that is, as a single current-affairs series published regularly at intervals short enough for readers to keep abreast of incoming news) then Relation was the first European newspaper.

However the English historian of printing Stanley Morison held that the Relation should be classified as a newsbook, on the grounds that it still employed the format and most of the conventions of a book: it is printed in quarto size and the text is set in a single wide column. By Morison's definition, the world's first newspaper would be the Dutch Courante uyt Italien, Duytslandt, &c. from 1618. By the same definition no German, English, French, or Italian weekly or daily news publications from the first half of the seventeenth century could be considered "newspapers" either. As noted above, the World Association of Newspapers and many others have not adopted his definition.

== See also ==
- List of newspapers by date

== Sources ==
- Fischer, Heinz-Dietrich (1972). "Die Zeitung als Forschungsproblem". In Heinz-Dietrich, Fischer (ed.). Deutsche Zeitungen des 17. bis 20. Jahrhunderts (in German). Pullach: Verlag Dokumentation Saur. doi:10.1515/9783111559216. ISBN 9783111559216.
- Weber, Johannes (2006). "Strassburg, 1605: The Origins of the Newspaper in Europe". German History. 24 (3): 387–412. doi:10.1191/0266355406gh380oa.
