= Il Messaggiere =

Newspaper published in Modena, Italy

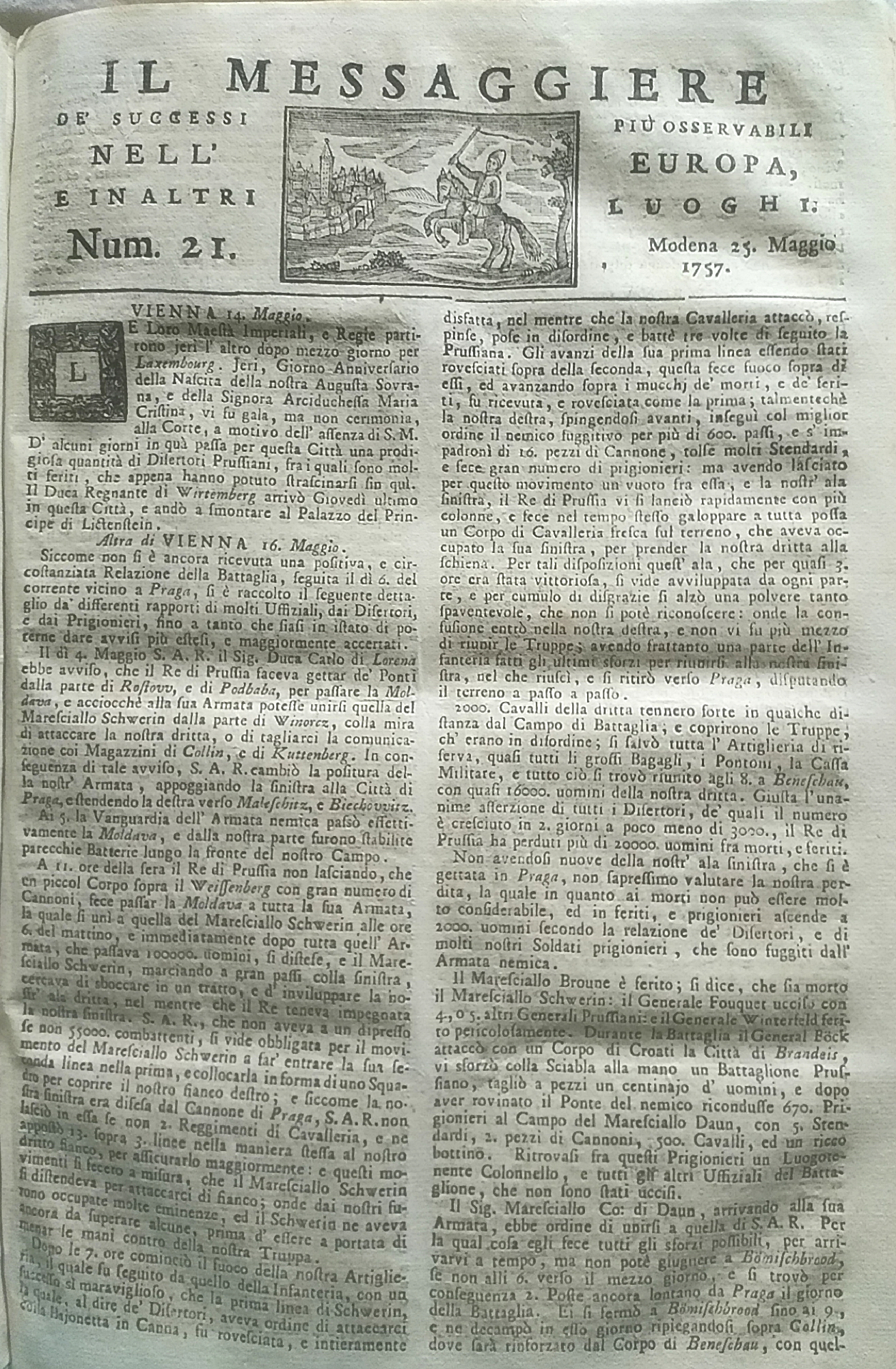
- A number of May 1757
- Founder: Antonio Bernardi
- Founded: 14 August 1749
- Ceased publication: 15 June 1859
- Language: Italian
- City: Modena

Il Messaggiere, later known as Il Messaggere (English: "The Messenger") from 1800, was a newspaper published in Modena between 1749 and 1859, with some interruptions during the Napoleonic era. It served as the official newspaper of the Duchy of Modena and Reggio, an ancient independent Italian State.

== Foundation and first editor ==
After the final issue of the ancient newspaper Modona in 1700, no other newspaper was printed in Modena until Francesco III d'Este, Duke of Modena, requested Abbot Antonio Bernardi to start publishing Il Messaggiere. Bernardi, also known by his nickname Abate Falloppia, had previously published a handwritten avviso titled Europa in Venice. (Note: The older existing number of the Europa is dated 20 June 1739 and the last published by Bernardi is dated May 1749. The Europa continued to be published handwritten till 1780.) He moved to Modena in the summer of 1749. (Note: The complete title in 1749 was Messaggiere, ovvero compendio degli avvenimenti più onorevoli dell'Europa.) The first issue of Il Messaggiere was dated August 14, 1749. It was published weekly on Wednesdays, with Tip. Zuliani Claudio e Antonio initially serving as printers, followed later by Soliani Bartolomeo.

An article published in Il Messaggiere on July 27, 1756, offended Prime Minister Felice Antonio Bianchi, who then secured Bernardi's dismissal from the Duke. Bernardi's last issue of the newspaper was published on August 25, 1756. Abbot Antonio Bernardi died in extreme poverty in Modena on 17 August 1757 at the age of 78. He was probably a Frenchman.

== 18th century and Napoleonic era ==
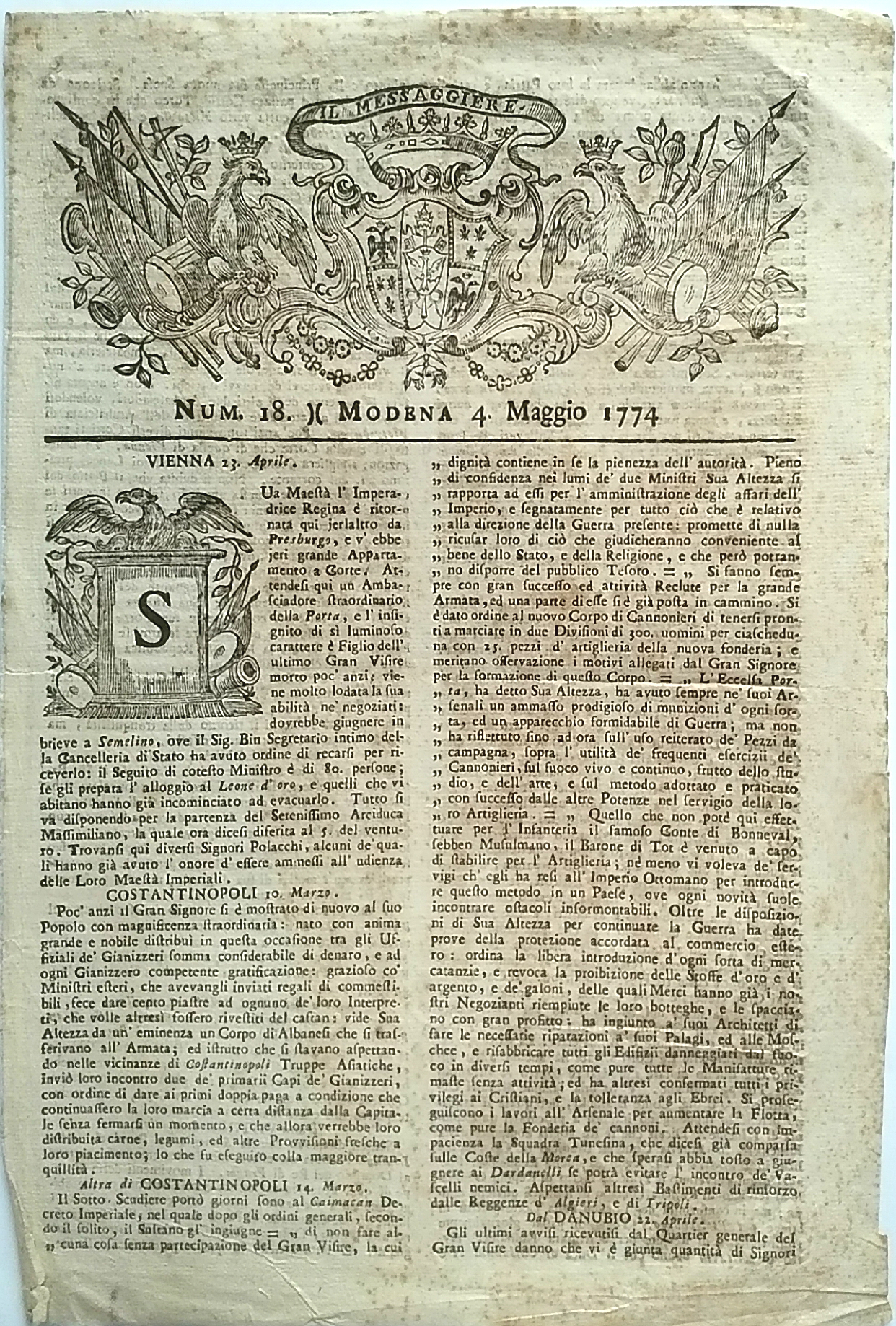
A number of 1774

On September 1, 1756, the newspaper was taken over by the new publisher, Pellegrino Niccolò Loschi. (Note: The complete title on 1 September 1756 was Il Messaggiere delle cose più osservabili nell'Europa ed in altri luoghi, which after just one week was modified in Il Messaggiere de' successi più osservabili nell'Europa ed in altri luoghi, and from 11 January 1758 it became Il Messaggiere de' successi più notabili nell'Europa ed in altre parti del mondo.) It continued to be issued weekly, with Tip. Eredi di Bartolomeo Soliani as the printers. The image near the title depicted a courier riding a horse towards a town on the right; on May 25, 1757, the image was reversed, showing the town on the left.

The newspaper covered major public events in Modena, but most of its content was dedicated to foreign affairs, particularly those relevant to the Habsburg Empire. After Loschi, other publishers followed, all careful to adhere to the Duke's political line: Camillo Tori from June 6, 1759, Mr. Renza from 1761, Giuseppe Maria Cavi from 1770, and Giovan Battista Munarini from 1782 to 1796. From July 1, 1767, the design of the first page changed: the only image was the coat of arms of the House of Este, who ruled the Duchy of Modena, without any headlines. The title, Il Messaggiere, was nestled into the coat of arms. From March 1, 1780, it retained only the coat of arms without any title.

The last issue of Il Messaggiere during the Ancien Régime was published on May 4, 1796, three days before Duke Ercole III d'Este fled to Venice due to the French invasion.During the Napoleonic era, Il Messaggiere was published twice: from January 22 to June 18, 1800, and from January 16 to December 27, 1805, always edited by the Soliani family with the Este coat of arms and the usual title. The closures in 1800 were due to Napoleon's victory at the Battle of Marengo, and in 1805 due to disagreements with the French government.

== Early 19th century ==
With the dissolution of the Napoleonic Kingdom of Italy in 1814, following the Battle of Waterloo, the Duchy of Modena and Reggio was restored, and the newspaper was again published by the Soliani family starting from January 4, 1815, under the title Il Messaggiere Modenese on a biweekly basis. In 1822, it was transferred from the Soliani Printing House to the Government Printing Press. (Note: the Tipografia camerale.)

As the official newspaper of the Duchy, it ran until April 18, 1848, when it ceased publication due to the Revolutions of 1848. Il Messaggiere was published again from September 1, 1848, (Note: the title with its headline was Il Messaggere. Foglio di Modena, and from 1851 it became Il Messaggere di Modena.) incorporating the experiences of other reactionary newspapers published in Modena. (Note: such as the Diario Modenese (published 23 March to 30 August 1848) and the previous Il Foglio di Modena (published 6 July 1841 to 20 5 March 1848), and La voce della verità (published 5 July 1831 to 28 June 1841).) During these years, the newspaper had a circulation of about five hundred copies and was published three times a week, on Mondays, Wednesdays, and Fridays, and sometimes also on Saturdays in a half edition.

== Last years ==
After the Battle of Magenta, on June 11, 1859, Francis V, Duke of Modena, fled, marking the end of the Duchy of Modena and Reggio. On June 10, Il Messaggiere was published in its usual form for the last time. On June 15, it retained its old name but replaced the coat of arms of the House of Austria-Este with that of the House of Savoy. On June 20, it changed its name to Gazzetta di Modena.

The Gazzetta di Modena aimed to be the official newspaper of the town's government and had a circulation of about two thousand copies. The last issue was published on October 30, 1862, two years after the Unification of Italy.
