= Avisa Relation oder Zeitung =

Periodical literature

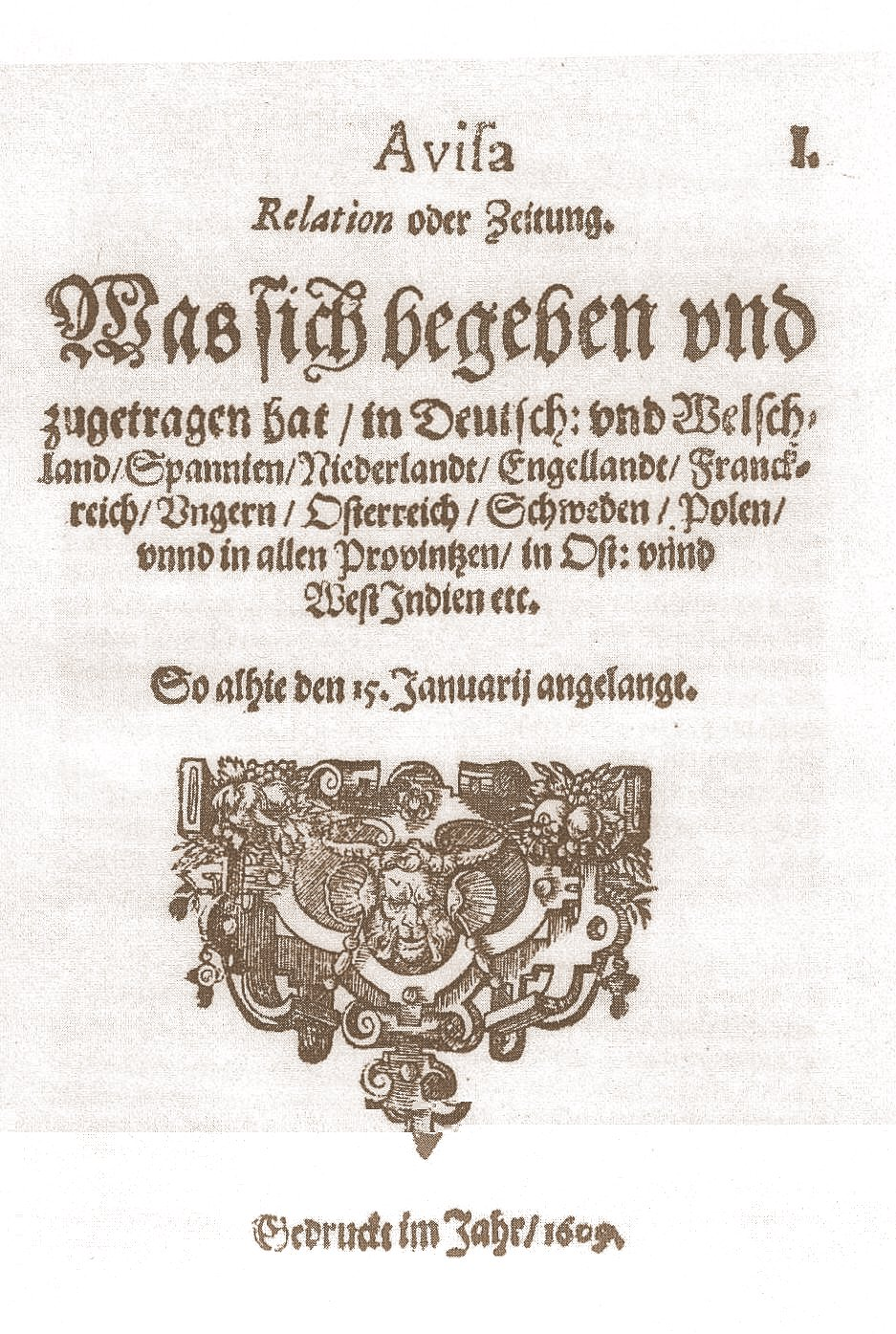
Front page of the first Avisa, Relation oder Zeitung (15 January 1609)

Avisa Relation oder Zeitung was one of the first news-periodicals in the world. It was published in Wolfenbüttel, Germany, in 1609. The printer/publisher was Julius Adolph von Söhne. The first issue states that the news had been collected from various countries by 15 January. It is presumed that the issue was printed on or about that date.

Some books mention the Avisa as the world's first newspaper. Before 2005 there was a dispute whether the Avisa or the Relation aller Fürnemmen und gedenckwürdigen Historien, which was printed in Strassburg by Johann Carolus, was first. It was believed that both started in 1609. New evidence found in 2005, however, suggests that the Relation started as early as 1605. The last issue of the newspaper probably appeared on 15 December 1632.

There is also a differing view, which does not regard either of these two publications as newspapers in a formal sense. Authors like Stanley Morison make a distinction between newsbooks (weekly news publications in a quarto format) and later folio-sized newspapers.

== See also ==
- List of newspapers by date
