= Hildesheimer Allgemeine Zeitung =

German newspaper in Lower Saxony

- Front Page of Hildesheimer Relations Courier in 1705
- Type: Daily newspaper
- Founded: 1705
- Language: German
- Headquarters: Hildesheim, Germany
- Website: http://www.hildesheimer-allgemeine.de/

Hildesheimer Allgemeine Zeitung is a German newspaper published in Hildesheim, Germany. It was established as Hildesheimer Relations Courier, first published on 24 June 1705.

== History of the newspaper ==
The Hildesheimer Allgemeine Zeitung is the oldest daily newspaper in Germany. The path from the Relations-Courier to the HAZ was long and the history of the newspaper was characterized by breaks. There were changes in the newspaper titles, the mode of publication, the content and the owners.

Founded on June 24, 1705 as the Hildesheimer Relations-Courier, it was renamed Privilegierte Hildesheimische Zeitung for the first time in 1775. After a further change of name to Königlich-Preußische allergnädigst privilegierte Hildesheimische Zeitung (1802), the newspaper was discontinued in 1804. The founder was the newspaper correspondent Heinrich Christian Hermitz, who transferred the publishing house to his son-in-law Christian Levin Lüdemann in 1751. At this time, the newspaper did not yet have a comprehensive reporting section, but only covered national war events, natural disasters or gossip about the rulers. An actual local section did not appear until the middle of the 19th century.

After a three-year break in publication, the HAZ reappeared in 1807 as the Stadt-Hildesheimische privilegirte Zeitung und Anzeigen für alle Stände. At that time, the newspaper was distributed jointly by the owner of the newspaper license, Christian Ludwig Lüdemann, and the bookseller and publisher Johann Daniel Gerstenberg, whereby Gerstenberg alone acted commercially and editorially, while Lüdemann merely acted as a passive license holder. Gerstenberg, whose descendants still run the publishing house today, only officially received the privilege to publish newspapers after Lüdemann's death in 1819.

After various other name changes, the newspaper was given the name Hildesheimer Allgemeine Zeitung und Anzeigen für alle Stände in 1854, which was shortened to Hildesheimer Allgemeine Zeitung in 1922. On April 29, 2005, the newspaper celebrated its 300th birthday with a ceremony in the Hildesheim City Theater.

Unlike today, the Hildesheimer Allgemeine Zeitung was not aimed at the entire population in the 19th century and the first half of the 20th century, but from the middle of the century primarily at liberal readers and from 1867 above all at sympathizers of the National Liberal Party, as whose organ the newspaper saw itself and for which the publishers were also politically committed. During the Weimar Republic, the paper supported the German People's Party.

When Austria's Wiener Zeitung stopped publishing in print in 2023 amid a change in Austria's publishing laws, the title of the longest publishing newspaper fell to Hildesheimer Allgemeine Zeitung.
