= Gazeta em Que Se Relatam as Novas Que Houve Nesta e Que vieram de Várias Partes =

Former newspaper in Portugal

Gazeta em Que Se Relatam as Novas Que Houve Nesta Corte e Que vieram de Várias Partes
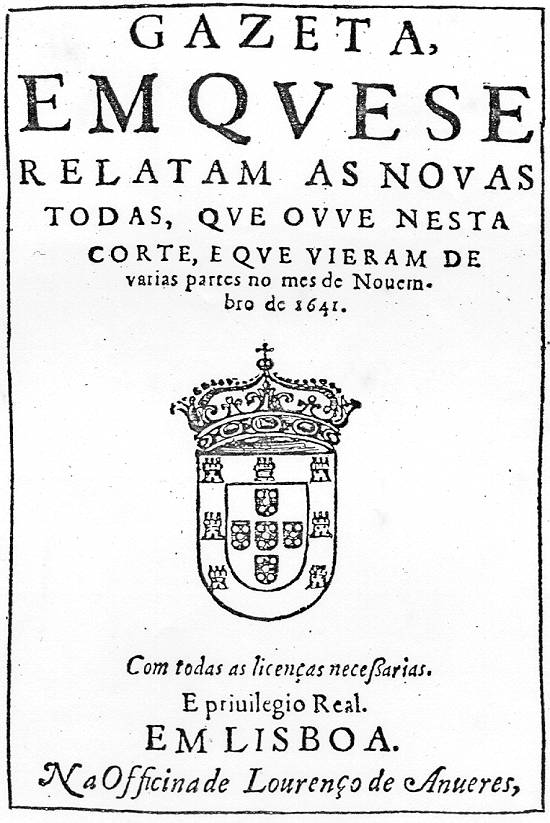
- Founded: 1641
- Political alignment: Royal
- Language: Portuguese
- Headquarters: Lisbon, Portugal

Gazeta em Que Se Relatam as Novas Que Houve Nesta Corte e Que vieram de Várias Partes was the first newspaper to be published in Lisbon, Portugal and also the first newspaper to be published in the Portuguese language. It was first published in 1641 by Manuel de Galhegos. Scholars also refer to this paper as the Gazeta da Restauração (Gazette of the [Portuguese] Restoration). There are 36 known issues of the newspaper.
