= Ordinari Freytags Post-Zeitung =

Newspaper

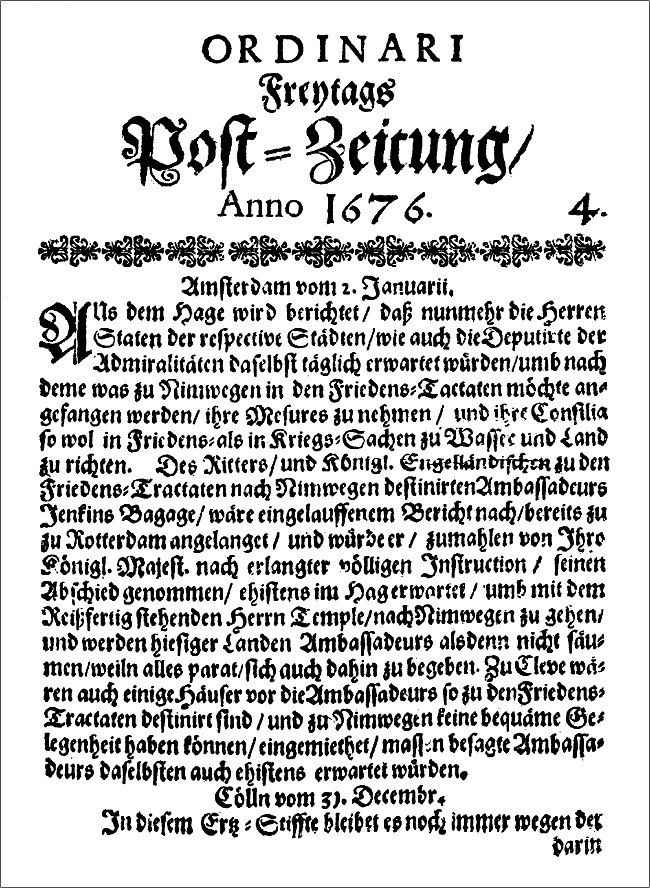
- Type: Weekly newspaper
- Founded: 1675
- Language: German
- Headquarters: Reval

Ordinari Freytags Post-Zeitung is the first newspaper to be published in the Baltic Region in 1675 in Reval. It was published in the German language by Christoph Brendenken.
