= Avvisi (newspaper 1777–1797) =

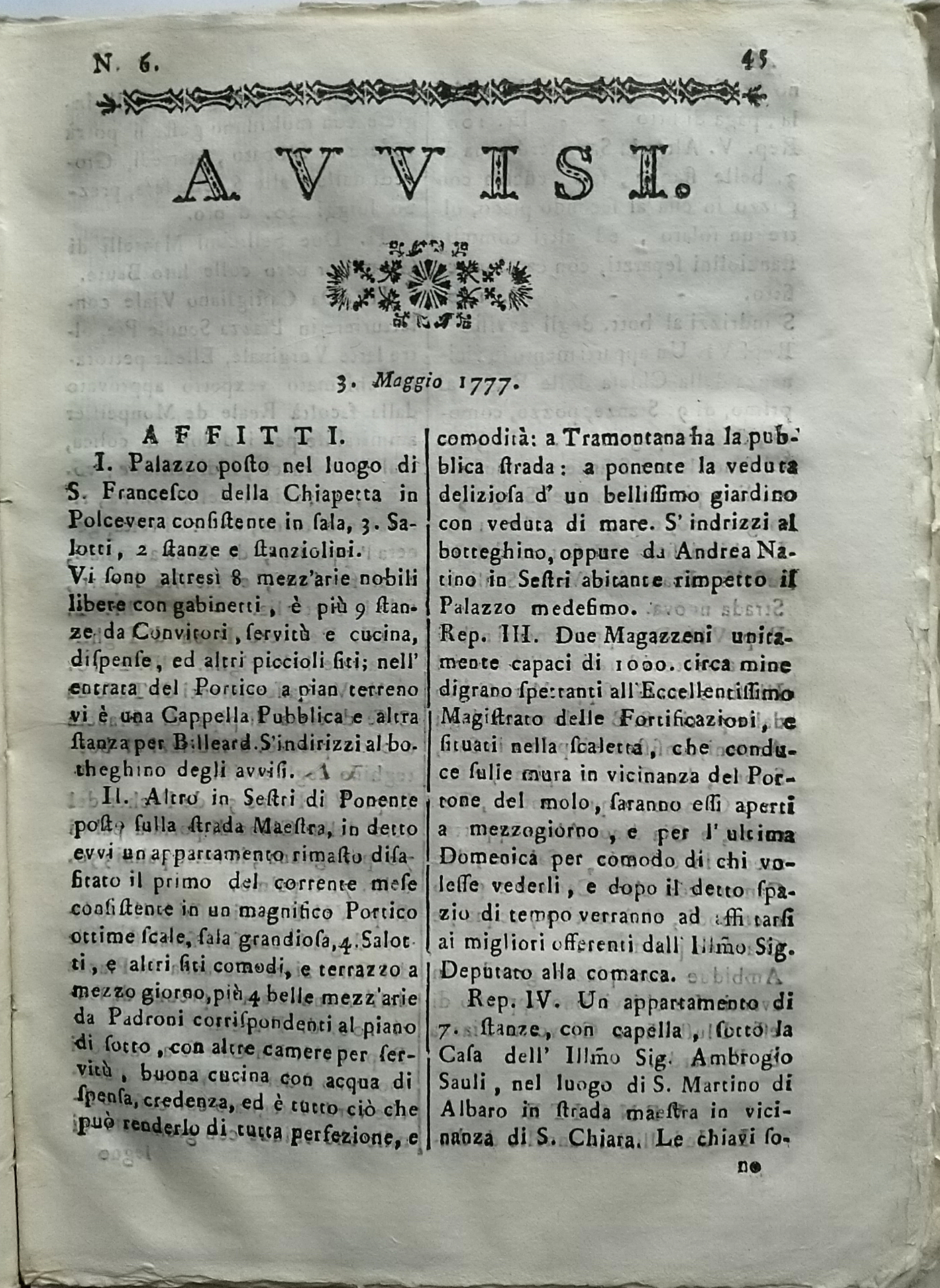
- Issue dated 3 May 1777
- Type: Weekly
- Editor: Andrea Corradi
- Founded: March 29, 1777
- Ceased publication: August 19, 1797
- Language: Italian
- City: Genoa

Avvisi (initially Foglio di notizie ed avvisi diversi) was a newspaper published in Genoa from 1777 to 1797. It mainly was composed by classified advertising, reports of local events and curious information, without any political news because of censorship.

== History ==
From 1684 the Republic of Genoa hadn't had any newspaper, until Giuseppe Lomellini became Doge on 4 February 1777. The next 29 March 1777 was published the first issue of the Foglio di notizie ed avvisi diversi (in English: Paper of news and various tidings) by Andrea Corradi. From the issue number six, dated 3 May 1777, the title changes simply in Avvisi and so it remained up to the last issue.

The printer was initially Felice Repetto located in Canneto; from issue 46 of 14 February 1778 the printer became Eredi di Adamo Scionico. With a few exceptions, it was published weekly, on Saturdays.

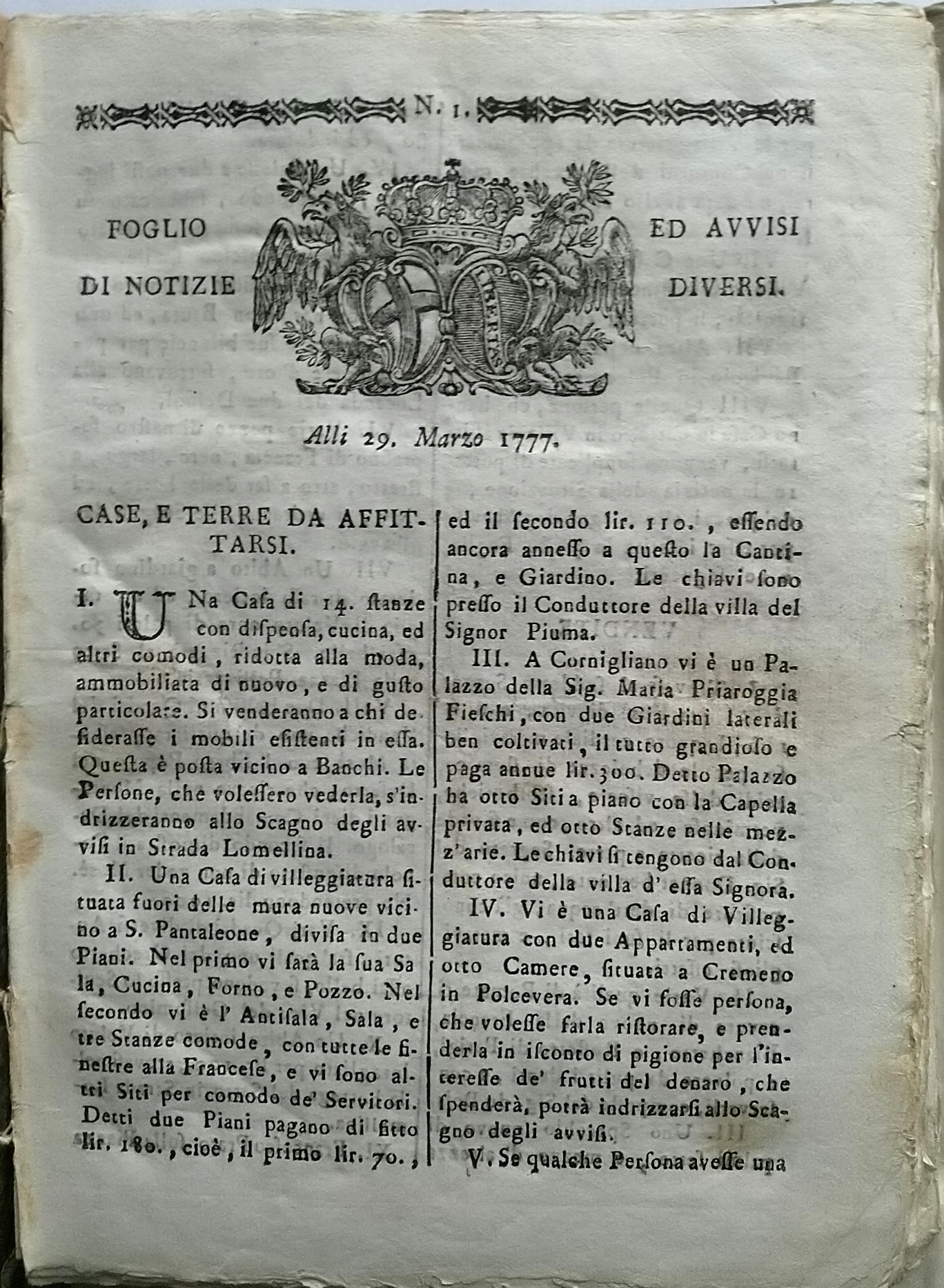
Issue 1 dated 29 March 1777

The Avvisi was composed of two sections of four pages each on two columns. The first section was dedicated to the town of Genoa, including mainly classified advertising, news about the movements of the ships in the harbor, main religious and musical events, as well as reports of official appointments and ceremonies. The second part, named Notizie enciclopediche (Note: The second part, initially named Supplemento alle notizie estranea, from issue five was named Notizie diverse and from 1778 it took the final name.) (in English: Encyclopedic news) contained extracts of foreign newspaper about discoveries, strange facts, book reviews, obituary notices of famous people. In any case the newspaper didn't contain any political news due to the strict censorship from the Republic of Genoa.

The Avvisi remained the only newspaper published in Genoa until the fall of the old Republic and the establishment on 14 June 1797 of the Ligurian Republic, a French client republic. The Avvisi continues to be printed under the new government that allowed a certain degree of freedom of the press. From 21 June 1797 the Avvisi started to publish a supplement on Wednesdays, but in August of the same year the editor decided to discontinue the newspaper, that had the last issue printed on 19 August 1797. On 23 August, in place of the supplement, was printed a notice that informed that the Avvisi was superseded by a new newspaper, more rich of news and issued biweekly. That new newspaper was L'amico delle leggi e delle virtù repubblicane, and it lived only the time of five issues.
