= A Aurora do Lima =

- Founded: December 15, 1855; 169 years ago
- Language: Portuguese
- Headquarters: Viana do Castelo, Portugal
- Website: www.auroradolima.com

A Aurora do Lima is a Portuguese language newspaper founded on December 15, 1855.It is one of the oldest newspapers in Portugal.

In April 2021, the municipality of Viana do Castelo acquired the archive of Aurora do Lima, for €170,000. The purchase included the newspaper's extensive historical collection, spanning from its founding in 1855, as well as its equipment and printing machinery. The acquisition aimed to preserve the cultural heritage of the publication and make its archives accessible to the public through digitization and integration with the municipal library system.
