= Gazeta Grodzieńska =

- Type: Weekly newspaper
- Format: 150x200 mm
- Owner: unknown postmaster of Grodno
- Founded: 1776
- Language: Polish
- Headquarters: Grodno, Polish–Lithuanian Commonwealth

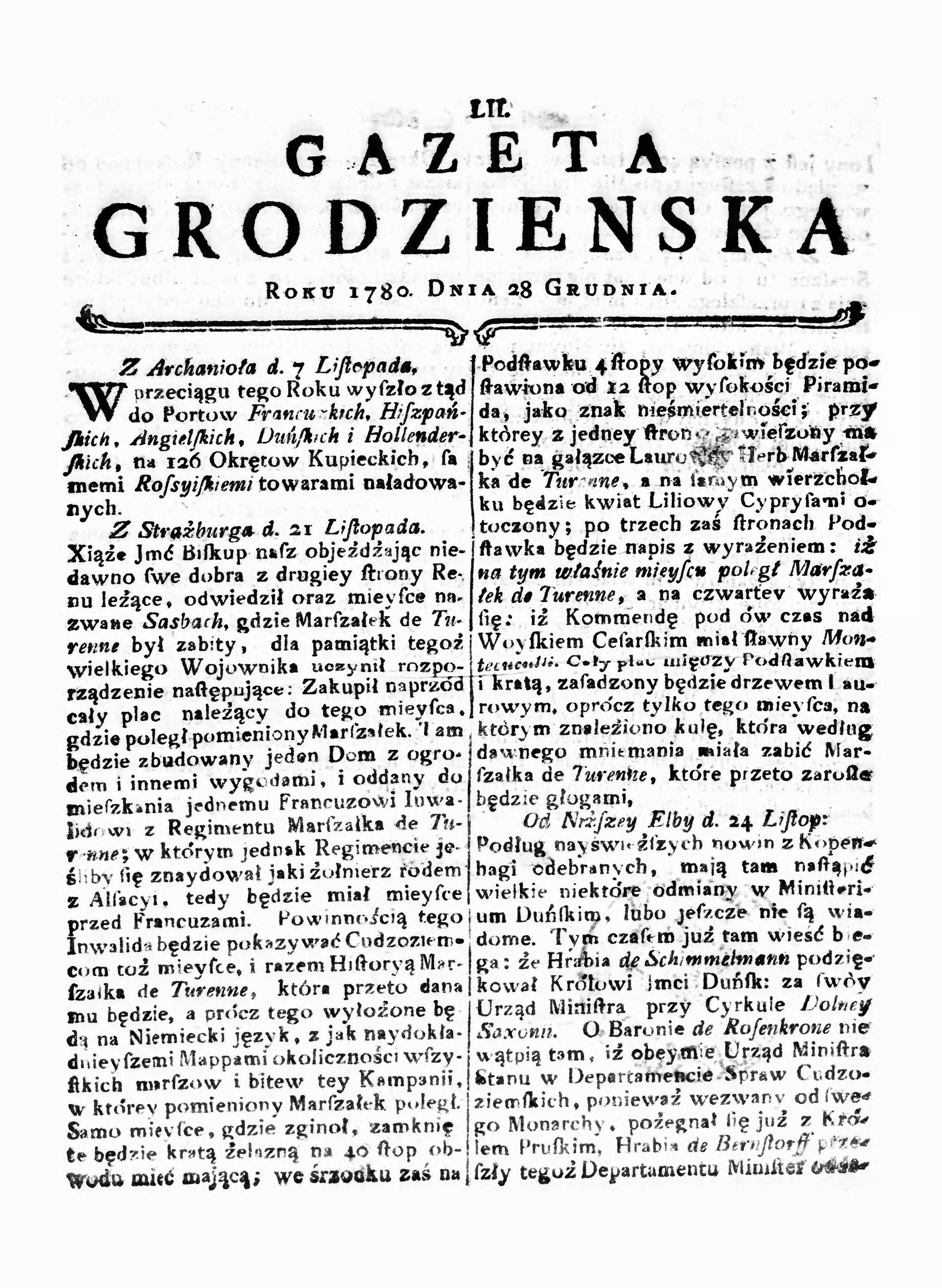

Gazeta Grodzieńska was a weekly Polish language newspaper published in Grodno, Polish–Lithuanian Commonwealth. It was first published in 1776 and lasted till 1783. It covered news about the Commonwealth.

The Grand Treasurer of Lithuania, Antoni Tyzenhaus, took over the former Jesuit printing press in Vilnius in 1775, formally on behalf of the king, but in reality for his own use. At the same time, he began efforts to establish a printing press in Grodno on its basis. The printing press was established the following year, formally likewise as a court-owned press. The printing press was established in the buildings of the former Jesuit college. Rev. Karol Malinowski was appointed its manager.

The first issue of Gazeta Grodzieńska was probably published in mid-May 1776, apparently without Tyzenhaus’s control and not on his initiative, as he distanced himself from it in response to the critical letters of King Stanislaus Augustus. It was only at the end of the year that Tyzenhaus took control of the title and introduced supervision of its contents, ensuring that it corresponded with the policies of the court. The publisher and editor of the newspaper remained an unnamed secretary of the post office in Grodno. From that time onward, it was published weekly in the form of a single sheet printed on both sides.

The newspaper most likely ceased publication in 1783.

== Bibliography ==
- Łojek, Jerzy (1966). ""Gazeta Grodzieńska" 1776-1783" (PDF). Rocznik Historii Czasopiśmiennictwa Polskiego. 5 (2): 5–44.
