= Jam-i-Jahan-Numa =

This is the first urdu paper

- Editor: Harihar Dutta
- Founded: 1822
- Ceased publication: 1845
- Language: Urdu, Persian

Jam-i-Jahan-Numa (lit. 'The world-revealing cup, i.e. Cup of Jamshid') was the first known Urdu-language newspaper. It was established in March 1822 in Kolkata by Harihar Datta. From its eighth issue, it began to be published in Persian as well, and eventually became an exclusively Persian-language newspaper. It operated until 1845. During its lifetime, the newspaper received support from the British colonial government. Famed poet Ghalib criticized the newspaper in a letter to a friend, accusing it to often be inaccurate and unreliable.
