= India Herald =

Madras based newspaper

- Owner(s): G. Humphreys
- Founded: 2 April 1795
- Language: English
- Headquarters: Madras, Madras Presidency, British India

India Herald was a newspaper published in Madras, Madras Presidency, British India. It was founded by Humphreys, an Englishman. It was initially published without obtaining permission from the government, for which offense Humphreys was arrested and deported. Although arrested for unauthorised publication, he managed to escape from the ship on which he was to be deported to England.
