= Gazeta de Barcelona =

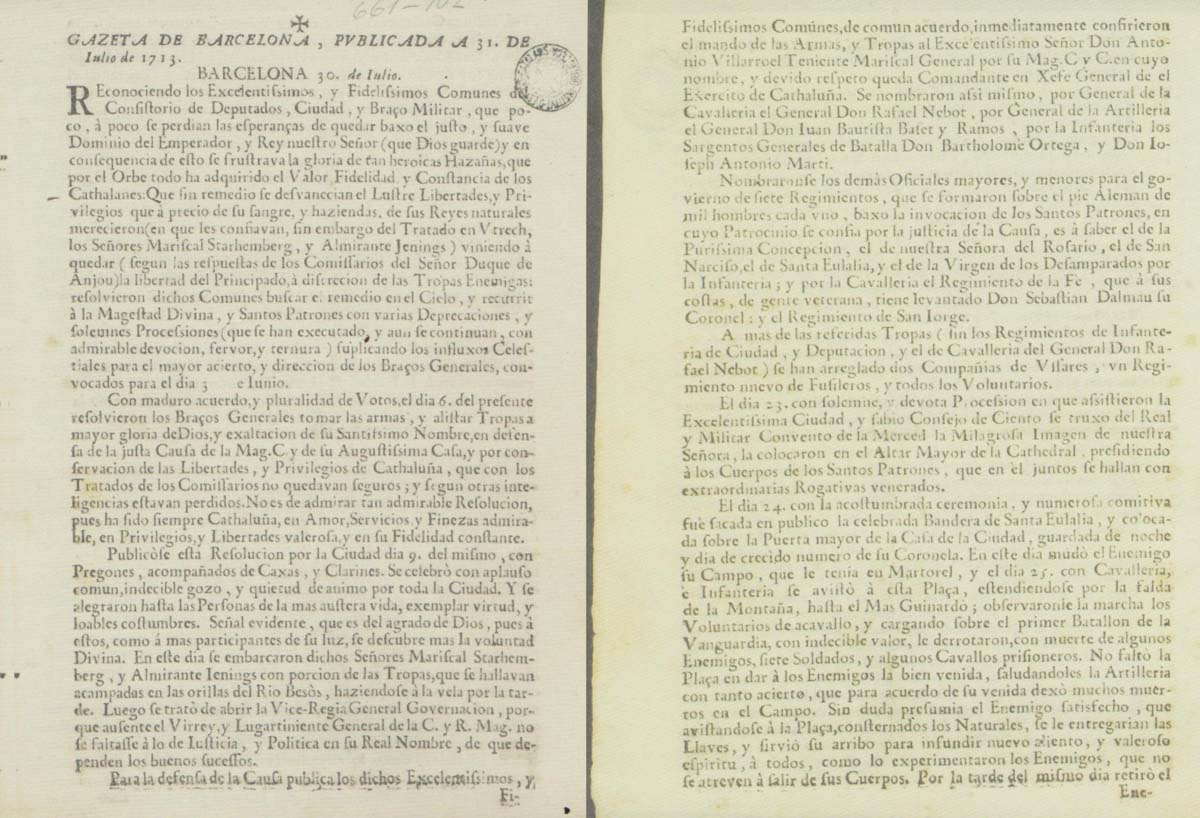
- 1713 issue
- Type: Weekly newspaper
- Founded: 1641
- Ceased publication: 1808
- Language: Catalan; Spanish
- Headquarters: Barcelona, Principality of Catalonia

Gazeta de Barcelona was a weekly newspaper from Barcelona, then the capital of the Principality of Catalonia, first published in Catalan and then also in Spanish. It was also the first newspaper published in the Iberian Peninsula, being founded in 1641.
