= Coimbatore Kalanidhi =

- Founded: 1880
- Language: Tamil
- Headquarters: Coimbatore, Madras Presidency, British India

Coimbatore Kalanidhi was a Tamil newspaper. It was established in 1880 and was amongst the first Tamil newspapers.
