= Salem Desabhimani =

- Founded: 1878
- Language: Tamil
- Headquarters: Madras Presidency, British India

Salem Desabhimani was a Tamil newspaper. It was established in 1880 and was amongst the first Tamil newspapers.
