= Pražské poštovské noviny =

Newspaper

- Type: Weekly newspaper
- Founder: Karel František Rosenmüller
- Founded: 1719
- Language: Czech
- Headquarters: Prague, Bohemia, Habsburg Monarchy

Pražské poštovské noviny (English: Prague Post Newspaper) was the first newspaper to be published in Czech. It was first published in Prague, Bohemia, Habsburg Monarchy in 1719. It ceased publication in 1772 but was revived in 1782 and existed till 1819.
