= Modona (newspaper) =

Gazette printed in Modena

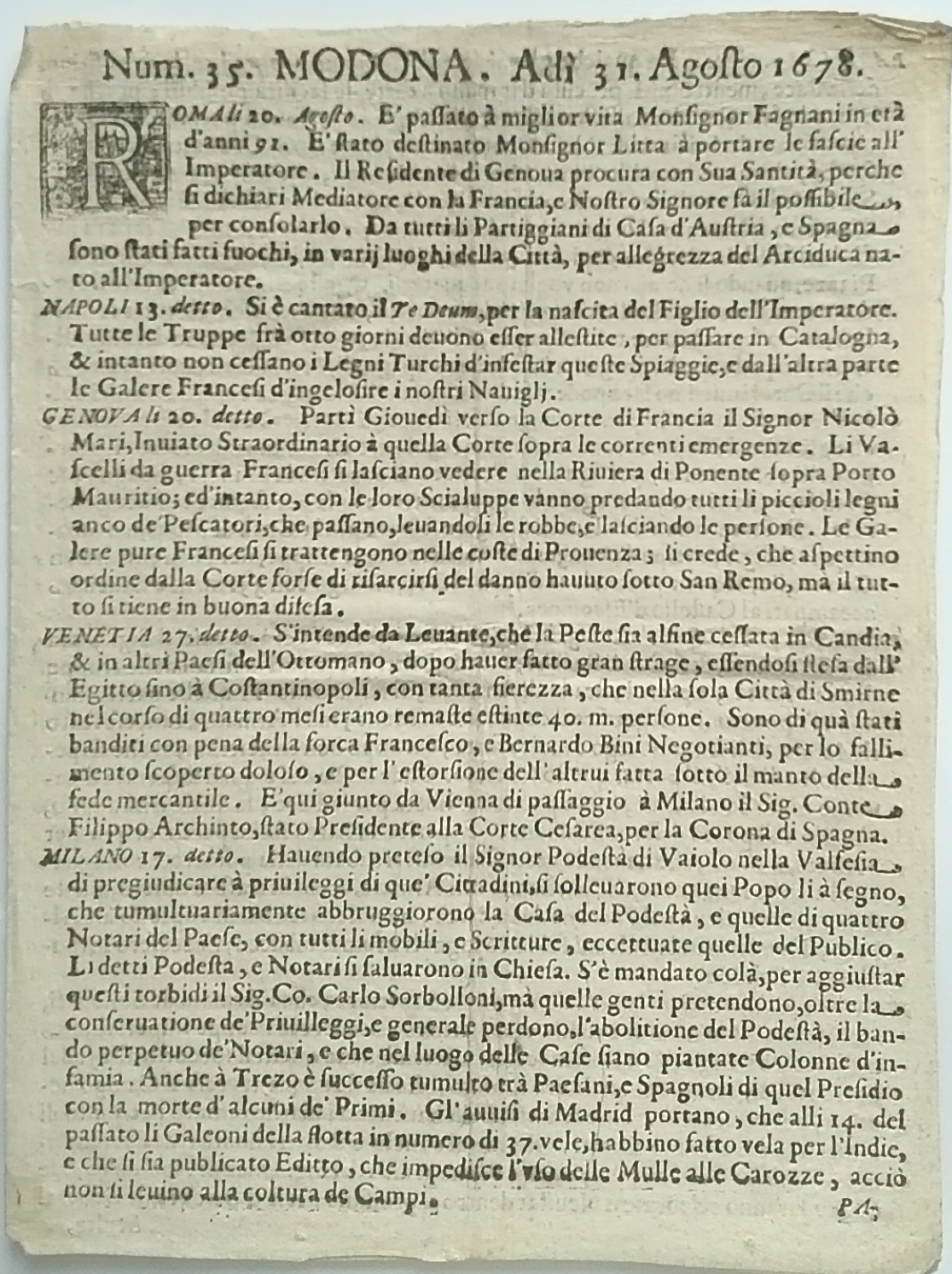
- a number of 1678
- Publisher: Demetrio Degni
- Founded: 1677
- Ceased publication: 1701
- Language: Italian
- City: Modena

Modona (sometimes referred to as Foglietti modenesi) was a newspaper published in Modena from 1677 to 1701 by Demetrio Degni.

== History ==
The printing of a newspaper in Modena had occurred for a very short time from 6 July 1658 to about the 10 August of the same year. (Note: It had the title Modana and the starting words of the first number were: Per chi legge (in English: for who reads). It was printed by Andrea Cassiani.) After 1658 no other newspaper was printed in the Duchy of Modena until a printer named Demetrio Degni started on 1677 the publishing of a gazette in that town, titled simply Modona (an archaic form of Modena). The first number still in existence is dated 28 April 1677. it was issued on a weekly basis, in about book paper size. It contained news from Italy and abroad, giving large space to news from Vienna, Hungary and Poland.

Demetrio Degni was born in Barletta in 1648. In 1671 he moved to Modena where he set a typography up. Along the typography he had a stationery shop to sell books and paper. He used to issue special numbers of his gazette to cover particular events, mainly reports of military battles, diplomatic notes and treaties. He printed also a specialized newspaper titled Giornale dal campo cesareo (in English: newspaper from the encampment of the Emperor) to follow the Great Turkish War.

Because of problems with the censorship, an order was issued by the government of Modena on 14 July 1701 to suspend the publication of the newspaper Modona. Demetrio Degni left Modena and moved to Cesena where he continued to publish a gazette. In 1713 he moved to Pesaro, his year of death is unknown.
