= Sambad Kaumudi =

Bengali weekly newspaper, 1819 to 1836

Sambad Kaumudi সংবাদ কৌমুদী
- Type: Weekly newspaper
- Owner: Raja Rammohan Roy
- Publisher: Bhabani Charan Bandyopadhyay, Gobinda Chandra Kongar
- Editor: Bhabani Charan, Bandyopadhyay, Harihar Dutta, Gobinda Chandra Kongar, Ananda Gopal Mukhopadhyay
- Founded: 1819
- Ceased publication: 1836
- Political alignment: none
- Language: Bengali
- Headquarters: Kolkata, Bengal

Sambad Kaumudi (Bengali: সংবাদ কৌমুদী) was a Bengali weekly newspaper published from Kolkata in the first half of the 19th century by Ram Mohan Roy. It was a noted pro-Reformist publication that actively campaigned for the abolition of the Sati Pratha.

== History ==
In the prospectus for the Sambad Kaumudi, published in English and Bengali in November 1821, Ram Mohan appealed to his countrymen to lend him "the support and patronage of all who feel themselves interested in the moral and intellectual improvement of our countrymen". In the same prospectus, he further stated that religious, moral and political matters, domestic occurrence, foreign as well as local intelligence including original communications on various hitherto unpublished interesting local topics, etc. would be published in the Sambad Kaumudi every Tuesday.

Although Ram Mohan Roy was the owner, Kaumudi was actually published in the name of Bhabani Charan Bandyopadhyay. The latter soon found Ram Mohan's ideas too radical and parted company to start a rival newspaper called Samachar Chandrika, which became an organ of orthodox Hinduism. The first issue of Sambad Kaumudi appeared on December 4, 1821. It contained an 'Appeal to the Bengali Public' in which it proclaimed that the primary object of its publication was to promote the 'public good'. On December 20, 1821, the Calcutta Journal brought out an editorial, commenting on the publication of this "new Bengali newspaper edited by a learned Hindoo". It also reproduced the prospectus and the 'Appeal to the Bengali Public'. In the appeal, Ram Mohan Roy said:

It is our intention hereafter to give further currency to the Articles inserted in this paper, by translating the most interesting parts in the different languages of the East, particularly Persian and Hindoostanee; but all this will entail considerable expense, the accomplishment of it will, of course, depend upon the encouragement which we may be able to obtain. The foregoing being an outline of what we are desirous of performing, our countrymen will readily conclude that although the paper in question be conducted by us, and may consequently be considered our property, yet virtually it is the 'paper of the public' since in it they can at all times have inserted, anything that tends to the public good ...

Though Bhabani Charan Bandyopadhyay was nominally in charge of this weekly till the publication of its thirteenth issue, Ram Mohan was its promoter, and for all practical purposes, also its editor. After Bhabani Charan Bandyopadhyay, Harihar Dutta was the editor for some time, followed by Gobinda Chandra Kongar. Due to lack of sufficient patronage Kaumudi had to stop publication in October 1822. In April 1823 a license was granted under the new Press Regulation to Gobinda Chandra Kongar to publish and Ananda Gopal Mukherji to edit the newspaper.

== Campaign against Sati ==
Sambad Kaumudi regularly editorialised against Sati, denouncing it as barbaric and un-Hindu. It was the main vehicle of Ram Mohan Roy's campaign against Sati. The editorial in the Calcutta Journal on February 14, 1823 observed, "The paper which was considered so fraught with danger and likely to explode over all India like a spark thrown into a barrel of gunpowder, has long since fallen to the ground for want of support; chiefly we understand because it offended the native community by opposing some of three customs, and particularly the burning of Hindoo widows, etc." Governor-General Bentinck, largely (though not exclusively) instigated by Ram Mohan Roy, responded to the growing public outcry by outlawing Sati in 1829.

== Government Attitude ==
The Government viewed the newspaper with an eye of suspicion. The officials believed that the newspaper was inspired by the Calcutta Journal and patronized by its owner James Silk Buckingham. The Asiatic Journal, the unofficial organ of the East India Company published from London took Buckingham to task for encouraging and patronizing an Indian newspaper like the Sambad Kaumudi which, it thought, could serve no other purpose that to promote Indian disaffection against British rule.
