= Myth=Mithya: A Handbook of Hindu Mythology =

2006 book on Hindu Mythology

Myth = Mithya: Decoding Hindu Mythology
- Author: Devdutt Pattanaik
- Language: English
- Subject: Hindu mythology, symbolism
- Genre: Non-fiction
- Publisher: Penguin Books (Penguin India / Penguin UK)
- Publication date: 2006
- Publication place: India
- Media type: Print (paperback)
- Pages: 212
- ISBN: 9780143423324

Myth = Mithya: Decoding Hindu Mythology (often shortened to Myth = Mithya) is a non-fiction book by Indian mythologist and author Devdutt Pattanaik. The book offers a compact handbook of Hindu mythology, decoding stories, symbols and rituals and exploring the distinction Pattanaik draws between myth (as cultural/subjective truth) and mithyā (context-dependent or illusory truth). It is one of the best sellers of Devdutt Pattanaik.

== Background ==
Devdutt Pattanaik — a physician-turned-mythologist and prolific author on Indian myth and culture — published Myth = Mithya as part of his body of work intended to make Hindu myths accessible to general readers and to read myths as cultural frames rather than literal histories. The book has appeared in multiple editions (India/UK) since its first publication in the 2000s.

== Contents and themes ==
The book has three parts- each covering Brahma-Saraswati, Vishnu-Lakshmi and Shiva-Shakti respectively.

The book is structured as a concise handbook that:

- Retells and summarizes key Hindu narratives (for example episodes concerning Shiva, Vishnu, Lakshmi and other deities).
- Decodes symbols (such as the linga, cosmological motifs) and rituals.
- Presents Pattanaik's conceptual distinction between different types of truth (sat vs. mithyā) and examines how myth functions as culturally embedded knowledge and as a language of meaning.

== Reception ==
Myth = Mithya has been widely cited in mainstream Indian media and described as a concise, accessible introduction to Hindu mythology. Early reviews noted the book's pocket-sized, handbook approach and praised Pattanaik's ability to explain complex and contradictory material in a compact, readable form.

India Today highlighted Pattanaik's framing of mithyā as “truth seen from a frame of reference” and noted the book's aim of helping readers understand myth as a mode of meaning rather than literal history.

== Academic and scholarly usage ==
While primarily aimed at general readers, Myth = Mithya has been cited in student work and in survey articles that discuss contemporary popular interpretations of Hindu myth. Scholars and pedagogues sometimes reference Pattanaik's distinctions (such as the sat/mithyā contrast) when discussing how modern readers interpret mythological content in cultural studies and comparative religion contexts.

== Editions ==
- Pattanaik, Devdutt. Myth = Mithya: Decoding Hindu Mythology. Penguin Books India. (paperback). First published 2006; later editions and printings issued by Penguin UK/India. ISBN 9780143423324 / 8184750218.

== See also ==
- The Pregnant King
- Sati Savitri: And Other Feminist Stories They Don't Tell You
