= Women in Hinduism =

Position of women in the religious texts of Hinduism

Diverse views on women and their roles exist within Hinduism.

Women in Hinduism is a topic that can be approached from varied perspectives including those of theology, history, sociology, the arts, education, and feminism. Ancient texts classify eight forms of marriage, ranked from recommended to condemned. The recommended forms involve a consensual relationship between a man and a woman, with the kind of ceremony required varying. The condemned forms involve the abduction of an insentient woman, though any resulting children were granted legal rights.

Scholars state that Vedic-era Hindu texts did not mention dowry or sati, which likely became widespread in the second millennium AD. Throughout history, Hindu society has seen many female rulers, such as Rudramadevi, religious figures and saints, such as Andal, philosophers, such as Maitreyi, and female practitioners/conductors of Vedic Hindu rituals.

The status of women in Hinduism experienced a decline during the inter-imperial period, the Dharmasastras such as Manusmriti imposed restrictions upon female sexuality and approved child brides.

Hinduism, states Bryant, has the strongest presence of the divine feminine among major world religions, from ancient times to the present. There are major goddess-centric Hindu traditions and denominations, such as Shaktism. Numerous matriarchal Hindu communities exist.

== Ancient texts ==
=== Vedic literature ===
Verses of ancient texts show that Vedism expounds reverence for the feminine. Like of the 10th chapter of the Rigveda, the part that has long been included here, is one that asserts the feminine to be the supreme principle behind all of cosmos.

The following hymn is called Devi Sukta,

I am the Queen, the gatherer-up of treasures, most thoughtful, first of those who merit worship.
Thus gods have established me in many places with many homes to enter and abide in.
Through me alone all eat the food that feeds them,-each man who sees, breathes, hears the word outspoken
They know it not, yet I reside in the essence of the Universe. Hear, one and all, the truth as I declare it.

I, verily, myself announce and utter the word that gods and men alike shall welcome.
I make the man I love exceeding mighty, make him nourished, a sage, and one who knows Brahman.
I bend the bow for Rudra that his arrow may strike and slay the hater of devotion.
I rouse and order battle for the people, I created Earth and Heaven and reside as their inner controller.

On the world's summit I bring forth the Father: my home is in the waters, in the ocean.
Thence I prevade all existing creatures, as their Inner Supreme Self, and manifest them with my body.
I created all worlds at my will, without any higher being, and permeate and dwell within them.
The eternal and infinite consciousness is I, it is my greatness dwelling in everything.

— Rigveda 10.125.3 - 10.125.8, The Vedas have some hymns accredited to women scholars who were known as "Brahmavadinis". There were many learnt women who could defeat men with their skills and intellect. These include Gargi, Ahalya, Maitreyi, Lopamudra, Ghosha, Swaha, Haimavati Uma, Gautami, Hemalekha, Sita etc.

=== Upanishads ===
The Devi Sukta ideas of the Rigveda are further developed in the relatively later composed Shakta Upanishads, states McDaniel, where the Devi asserts that she is Brahman, from her arise Prakṛti (matter) and Purusha (consciousness), she is bliss and non-bliss, the Vedas and what is different from it, the born and the unborn, and the feminine is thus all of the universe. She is presented as all the five elements, as well as all that is different from these elements, what is above, what is below, what is around, and thus the universe in its entirety. This philosophy is also found in the Tripuratapini Upanishad and the Bahvricha Upanishad.

The early Upanishads are, however, generally silent about women and men, and focus predominantly on gender-less Brahman and its relation to Atman (Soul, Self). There are occasional exceptions. Brihadaranyaka Upanishad, composed about 800 BCE, for example, in the last chapter detailing the education of a student, include lessons for his Grihastha stage of life. There, the student is taught, that as a husband, he should cook rice for the wife, and they together eat the food in certain way depending on whether they wish for the birth of a daughter or a son, as follows,

And if a man wishes that a learned daughter should be born to him, and that she should live to her full age, then after having prepared boiled rice with sesamum and butter, they should both eat, being fit to have offspring.

And if a man wishes that a learned son should be born to him, and that he should live his full age, then after having prepared boiled rice with grain and butter, they should both eat, being fit to have offspring.

— Brihadaranyaka Upanishad 6.4.17 - 6.4.18, Translated by Max Muller

Women are mentioned and are participants in the philosophical debates of the Upanishads, as well as scholars, teachers and priestesses during the Vedic and early Buddhist age. Among women acknowledged in the Upanishads are Gargi and Maitreyi. In Sanskrit, the word āchāryā means a "female teacher" (versus āchārya meaning "teacher") and an āchāryini is a teacher's wife, indicating that some women were known as gurus.

Female characters appear in plays and epic poems. The 8th century poet, Bhavabhuti describes in his play, Uttararamacharita (verse 2–3), how the character, Atreyi, travelled to southern India where she studied the Vedas and Indian philosophy. In Madhava's Shankaradigvijaya, Shankara debates with the female philosopher, Ubhaya Bharati and in verses 9–63 it is mentioned that she was well versed in the Vedas. Tirukkoneri Dasyai, a 15th-century scholar, wrote a commentary on Nammalvar's Tiruvaayamoli, with reference to Vedic texts such as the Taittiriya Yajurveda.

=== The Hindu historical epics ===
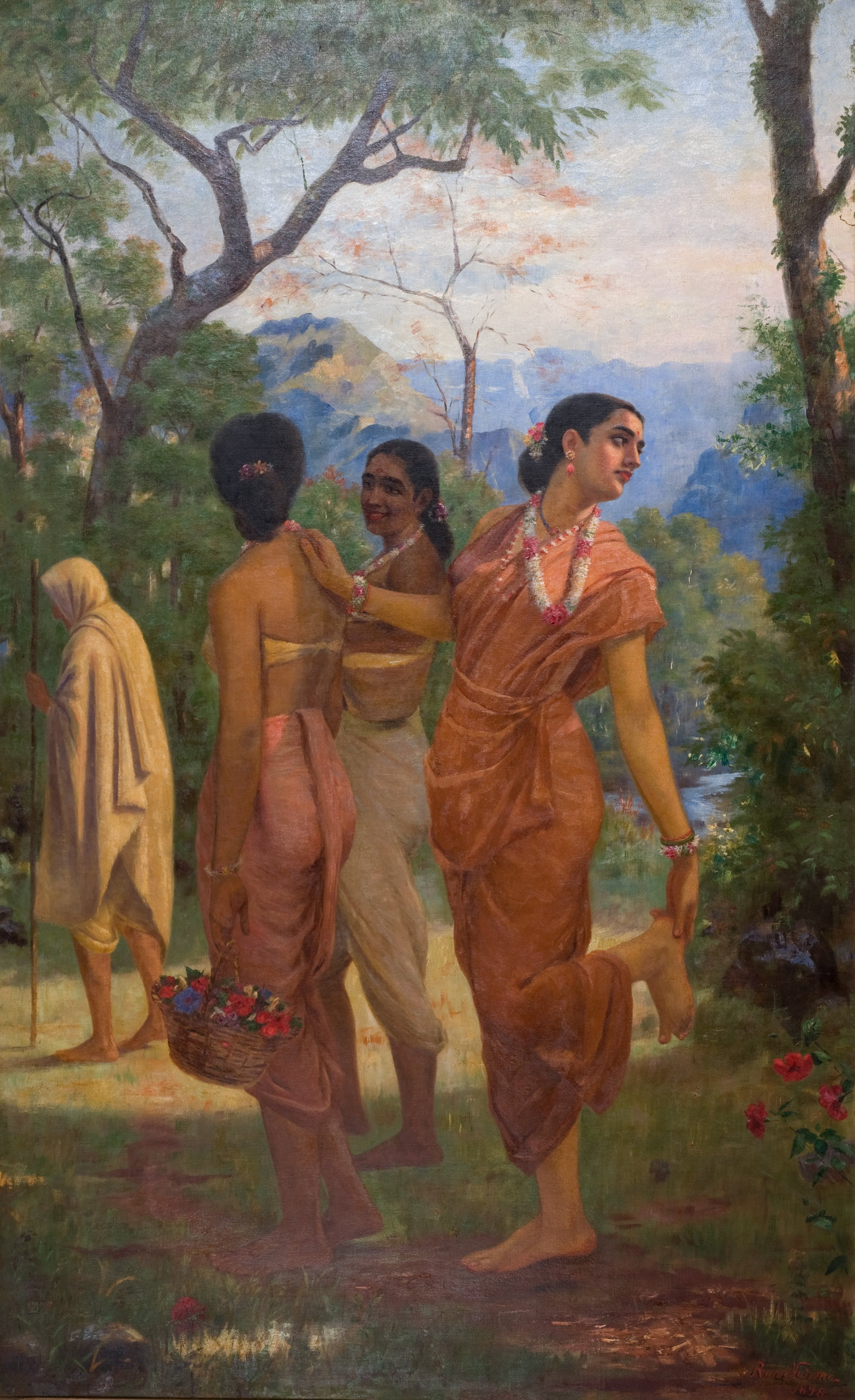
The Mahabharata is a legendary Hindu epic reflecting the Hindu Dharma-based social beliefs and culture in ancient India. In its first book, Dushmanta asks Sakuntala (above) to marry him for love, in Gandharva-style marriage, initially without informing their parents. The texts also describes seven other forms of marriage, and when they were appropriate with parents blessings within varnashram dharm or inappropriate out of varnashram dharm or against woman's wish.

In the two Hindu historical epics, Ramayana and Mahabharata, the role of women is multiple. The main female character in the Mahabharata, Draupadi is married to all the five Pandavas due to Kunti's directive to distribute without seeing what has been brought by Pandavas, thus had five husbands. She is insulted by Duryodhana, but Lord Krishna came to her rescue. This insult was one of the main reasons for the great war in restoring the honor of their woman. In the Ramayana, Sita is respected, honored, portrayed as wise and seen as inseparable from Rama and beloved but lived as a homemaker, the ideal wife and partner to Rama. While in the Adbhut Ramayana Sita is the most powerful and the destroyer of evil. In the Hindu dharma, women's oral readings of the Ramayana at home bring peace, happiness, good progeny, good health and relives family from bad luck and bad health. The Epics are divinely ordained to Rishis and seen thru divinely vision, and carry precepts of dharma embedded in them, suggesting perceived notions about women in Hinduism at the time the Epics were composed. The Mahabharata, in Book 1, for example, states,

No man, even in anger, should ever do anything that is disagreeable to his wife while upholding dharm; for happiness, joy, virtue and everything depend on the wife. Wife is the sacred soil in which the husband is born again, even the Rishis cannot create men without women.

— Adi Parva, Mahabharata Book, 1.74.50-51

The Anushasana Parva of the Hindu epic Mahabharata has several chapters dedicated to the discussion about duties and right of women. It gives a mixed picture. In chapter 11, the goddess of wealth and prosperity Lakshmi asserts, that she ( her divinity) lives in those women who are truthful, sincere, modest, organized, devoted to their husband and children, health conscious, patient and kind to parents, parent in laws and guests. The goddess asserts she does not reside in woman who is sinful, unclean, always disagreeing with her husband, has no patience or fortitude, is lazy, quarrelsome with her neighbors and relatives.

In chapter 47, as Yudhishthira seeks guidance on Dharma from Bhishma, the Anushasana Parva compares the value of daughter to a son, as follows,

The daughter, O king, has been ordained in the scriptures to be equal to the son.

— Bhishma, Anushasana Parva, Mahabharata 13.47.26

The duties of women are again recited in Chapter 146, as a conversation between god Shiva and his wife goddess Uma, where Shiva asks what are the duties of women. Devi Uma (Parvati) proceeds to meet all the rivers, who are all goddesses that nourish and create fertile valleys. Uma suggests that the duties of women include being of a good disposition, endued with sweet speech, sweet conduct, and sweet features, but at the same time be capable to sustain her own life( which can require being tough) if situation comes. For a woman, claims Uma, her husband is a God( and vice versa), her husband is her friend, and her husband is her high refuge(and vice versa). A woman's duties include physical and emotional nourishment, reverence and fulfillment of her husband and her children. Their happiness is her happiness, she observes the same vows as those that are observed by her husband, her duty is to be cheerful even when her husband or her children are angry, be there for them in adversity or sickness, is regarded as truly righteous in her conduct. Beyond her husband and family, her duty is to be cheerful of heart and humble with friends and relatives, do the best she can for friends and guests. Her family life and her home are equal to heaven, tells goddess Parvati to Shiva. Parvati adds at the end that if her husband is on his deathbed and asks her to do something, she should carry out his wishes under the codes of apāta dharma.

The Anushasana Parva of the Mahabharata has served as a source for modern era texts on women in Hinduism. For example, Tryambakayajvan of Thanjavur, in the 18th century CE, published Strīdharmapaddhati (or "Guide for a Dharmic Woman"). Tryambaka, according to Julia Leslie, selectively extracts verses from many chapters of Anushasana Parva. He selectively extracts verses from other books of the Mahabharata as well, and other ancient Indian texts, for Strīdharmapaddhati, choosing those he preferred, omitting verses from the Mahabharata that represent its characteristic style of presenting many voices and counter-arguments.

=== Shastras and Smritis ===
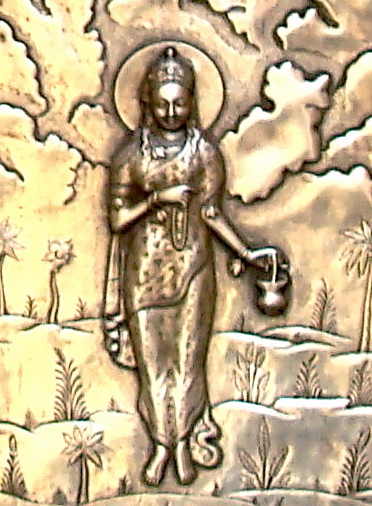
The Vedas and Shastras of Hinduism mention Brahmacharini (women) studying the Vedas. The word Brahmacharini is also revered in Hinduism as a goddess (above).

Scholars have questioned the authenticity of scriptural texts that offer insights into the role of women, as dozens of significantly different versions of the Smriti texts have been found. Patrick Olivelle for example, who is credited with a 2005 translation of Manusmriti published by the Oxford University Press, states the concerns in postmodern scholarship about the presumed authenticity and reliability of Manusmriti manuscripts. He writes (abridged),

The MDh [Manusmriti] was the first Indian legal text introduced to the western world through the translation of Sir William Jones in 1794. (...) All the editions of the MDh, except for Jolly's, reproduce the text as found in the [Calcutta] manuscript containing the commentary of Kulluka. I have called this as the "vulgate version". It was Kulluka's version that has been translated repeatedly: Jones (1794), Burnell (1884), Buhler (1886) and Doniger (1991). (...)

The belief in the authenticity of Kulluka's text was openly articulated by Burnell (1884, xxix): "There is then no doubt that the textus receptus, viz., that of Kulluka Bhatta, as adopted in India and by European scholars, is very near on the whole to the original text." This is far from the truth. Indeed, one of the great surprises of my editorial work has been to discover how few of the over fifty manuscripts that I collated actually follow the vulgate in key readings.

— Patrick Olivelle, Manu's Code of Law (2005)

Arthashastra, in chapter 1.21 describes women who had received military education and served to protect the king; the text also mentions female artisans, mendicants, and women who were wandering ascetics. Arthashastra also describes the purpose of a woman in life to be providing a male heir for her husband's lineage.

One of the most studied about the position of women in medieval Hindu society has been a now contested Calcutta manuscript of Manusmriti. The text preaches chastity to widows such as in verses 5.158–5.160. In verses 2.67–2.69 and 5.148–5.155, Manusmriti preaches that as a girl, she should respect and seek protection of her father, as a young woman her husband, and as a widow her son and should receive the same respect from them as well, and that a woman should always worship her husband as a god and vice-versa.

In other verses, Manusmriti respects and safeguards women rights. Manusmriti in verses 3.55–3.56, for example, declares that "women must be honored and adorned", and "where women are revered, there the gods rejoice; but where they are not, no sacred rite bears any fruit". Elsewhere, in verses 5.147–5.148, states Olivelle, the text declares, "a woman must never seek to live independently".

During the inter-imperial interregnum between the Mauryas and the Guptas, the status of women in Hinduism declined. An upper-caste Hindu man was expected to marry and have sons at the appropriate stages of life (Āśrama) and could not remain celibate throughout his life, unlike in religions such as Jainism or Buddhism.

The Laws of Manu declared that a woman was always dependent, approved of child brides, decreased their property rights, prohibited widow remarriage and imposed restrictions on the sexuality of women due to their “promiscuous and vicious nature.” Manu described different types of marriages and ranked them by prestige. Notably, the “love marriage” was ranked only above the forced-abduction form of marriage, which also included the killing of the bride’s family, which was allowed by Manu for the Kshatriya class. The positions laid down by Manu remain relevant in Hinduism and India today, where child marriage, dowry, and forced marriages persist.

==== Divorce ====
The text declares that a marriage cannot be dissolved by a woman or a man, in verse 8.101–8.102. Yet, the text, in other sections, allows either to dissolve the marriage. For example, verses 9.72–9.81 allow the man or the woman to get out of a fraudulent marriage or an abusive marriage, and remarry; the text also provides legal means for a woman to remarry when her husband has been missing or has abandoned her.

Arthashastra is a Mauryan era text on governance. However, it is not a religious Hindu book per se. Rather, it is an irreligious and secular book on governance to help and guide the Mauryan Emperors. Its author, Kautilya, argued in favour of a secular state based on dharma, a word which means "righteousness" in Sanskrit (often mistranslated as "religion"). It states:

A woman, hating her husband, can not dissolve her marriage with him against his will. Nor can a man dissolve his marriage with his wife against her will. But from mutual enmity, divorce may be obtained (parasparam dveshánmokshah). If a man, apprehending danger from his wife desires divorce (mokshamichhet), he shall return to her whatever she was given (on the occasion of her marriage). If a woman, under the apprehension of danger from her husband, desires divorce, she shall forfeit her claim to her property; marriages contracted in accordance with the customs of the first four kinds of marriages cannot be dissolved.

==== Varna ====
The text in one section opposes a woman marrying someone outside her own (varna) as in verses 3.13–3.14. Simultaneously, states Olivelle, the text presupposes numerous practices such as marriages outside varna, such as between a Brahmin man and a Shudra woman in verses 9.149–9.157, a widow getting pregnant with a child of a man she is not married to in verses 9.57–9.62, marriage where a woman in love elopes with her man, and then grants legal rights in these cases such as property inheritance rights in verses 9.143–9.157, and the legal rights of the children so born. The text also presumes that a married woman may get pregnant by a man other than her husband, and dedicates verses 8.31–8.56 to conclude that the child's custody belongs to the woman and her legal husband, and not to the man she got pregnant with.

==== Property rights ====
Manusmriti provides a woman with property rights to six types of property in verses 9.192–9.200. These include those she received at her marriage, or as gift when she eloped or when she was taken away, or as token of love before marriage, or as gifts from her biological family, or as received from her husband subsequent to marriage, and also from an inheritance from deceased relatives.

==== Inconsistency and authenticity issues ====
Scholars state that less than half, or only 1,214 of the 2,685 verses in Manusmriti, may be authentic. Further, the verses are internally inconsistent. Verses such as 3.55–3.62 of Manusmriti, for example, glorify the position of women, while verse such as 9.3 and 9.17 do the opposite. Mahatma Gandhi, when asked about his view about the Smriti, stated, that "there are so many contradictions in the printed volume that, if you accept one part, you are bound to reject those parts that are wholly inconsistent with it. (...) Nobody is in possession of the original text [of Manusmriti].

Flavia Agnes states that Manusmriti is a complex commentary from women's rights perspective, and the British colonial era codification of women's rights based on it for Hindus, and from Islamic texts for Muslims, picked and emphasized certain aspects while it ignored other sections. This construction of personal law during the colonial era created a legal fiction around Manusmriti's historic role as a scripture in matters relating to women in South Asia.

=== Puranas ===
Perhaps the most widely heard and popular purana, the Bhagavata Puraṇa presents several striking role reversals to illustrate that bhakti transcends social and gender hierarchies. Women in the Bhagavata Purana, including Kunti, Devahuti, and the female residents of Vraja, are depicted as exemplary devotees who actively participated in philosophical discussions, and even served as instructors to men. The text also features instances where the wives are portrayed as intellectually superior to their husbands, with Gupta and Valpey arguing that this narrative underscores the Bhagavata Purana's main argument that spiritual merit earned through devotion transcends established social, gender, or religious status.

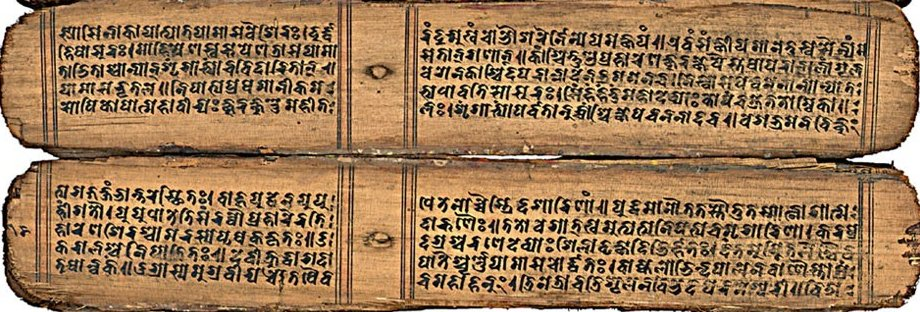
Devi Mahatmya, a Hindu Sanskrit manuscript from Nepal 11th-century (above), helped crystallize the goddess tradition where the creator God is a female, but neither feminine nor masculine, rather spiritual and a force of good.

The Devi Mahatmya found in Markandeya Maha-Purana, and the Devi-Bhagavata Purana have some of the most dedicated discussion of Devi and sacred feminine in late ancient and early medieval era of Hinduism. However, the discussion is not limited to these two major Hindu Goddess religion-related texts. Women are found in philosophical discussions across numerous other Puranas and extant era texts. For example, Parvati in a discussion with her husband Shiva, remarks:

You should consider who you are, and who nature is.... how could you transcend nature? What you hear, what you eat, what you see – it is all Nature. How could you be beyond Nature? You are enveloped in Nature, even though you don't know it.

— Skanda Purana 1.1.21.22, Translated by Nicholas Gier

Feminine symbolism as being sacred and for reverence were present in ancient Hindu texts, but these were fragmentary states Brown, and it was around the sixth century CE, possibly in northwest India, that the concept of Maha-Devi coalesced as the Great Goddess, appearing in the text of Devi Mahatmya of Markandeya Purana. This development of the divine woman was not theoretical, according to Brown, but has impacted "self understanding of Hindus to the present day" and "what it means to be human in a universe that is infinite and yet is pervaded by the very human quality of a woman's care and anger". Devi Mahatmya, also called Durga Saptasati (or 700 verses to Durga), has been enormously popular among Hindus through the centuries, states Coburn. Devi Mahatmya does not attempt to prove that the female is supreme, but assumes it as a given and its premise. This idea influenced the role of women in Hinduism in the Puranic texts that followed for centuries, where male-dominated and female-dominated couples appear, in various legends, in the same religious text and Hindu imagination.

The Devi Mahatmya presents the idea, states McDaniel, of a divine she who creates this universe, is the supreme knowledge, who helps herself and men reach final liberation, she is multitasking who in times of prosperity is Lakshmi brings wealth and happiness to human homes, yet in times of adversity feeds and fights the battle as the angry woman destroying demons and evil in the universe after metamorphosing into Durga, Chandika, Ambika, Bhadrakali, Ishvari, Bhagvati, Sri or Devi. However, notes Brown, the celebration of the goddess as supreme in Devi Mahatmya is not universal in Hindu texts of 1st millennium CE, and other Puranic texts celebrate the god as supreme, while acknowledging supreme goddess in various chapters and presenting the female as the "effective power behind any male" either in mythological sense or theological sense or both.

The ideas of the 6th-century Devi Mahatmya are adopted in 11th-century text of Devi-Bhagavata Purana, another goddess-classic text of Shakti tradition of Hinduism. However, this text emphasizes devotion and love as the path to her supreme nature as goddess. In the latter text, Devi appears as a warrior goddess destroying demons, a world-mother nurturing the good, as the creator, the sustainer and the destroyer as different aspects of her, the one supreme.

Other Puranas articulate the importance of scriptural women within a devotional rather than purely divine framework.

== Gender of God ==
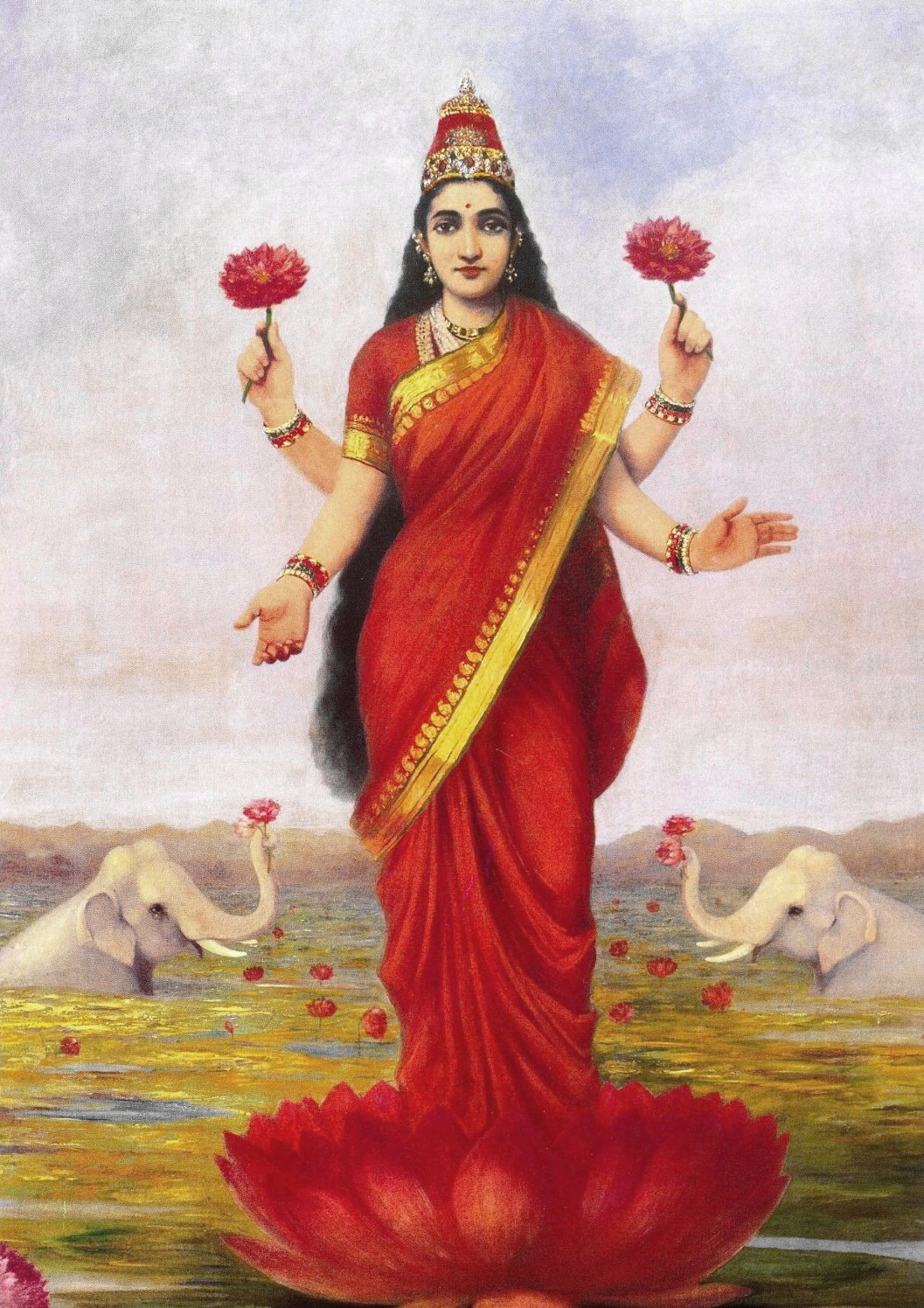
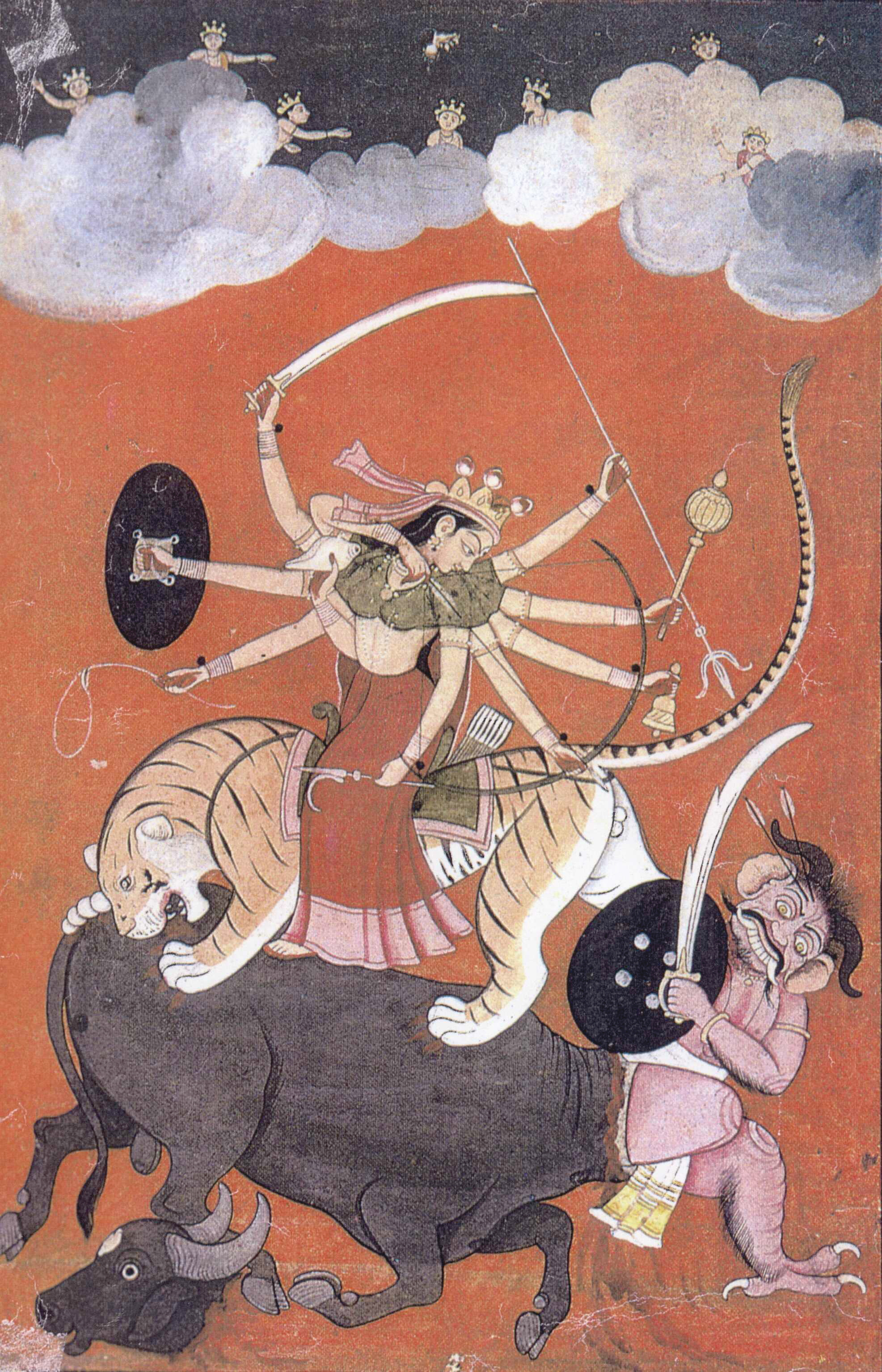
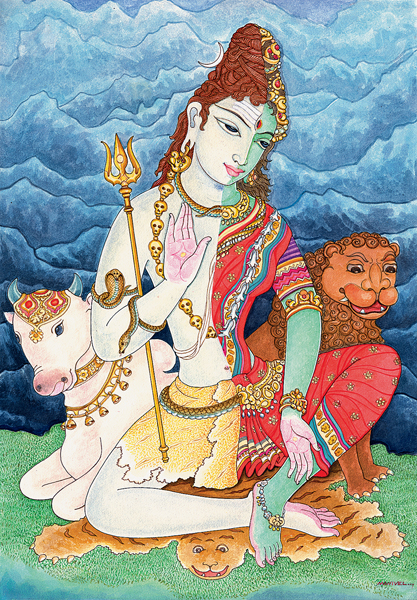
Goddesses in Hinduism are very common. Other ideas found include androgynous concept such as Ardhanarishvara (a composite god that is half Shiva-male and Parvati-female), or as formless and genderless Brahman (Universal Absolute, Supreme Self as Oneness in everyone).

In Hinduism, specifically in the Advaita Vedanta, the impersonal Absolute (Brahman) is genderless. Both male gods (Deva) and female gods (Devi) are found in Hinduism. But many Shaktism and other sects describes the main ultimate God is as feminine energy (The Mother Goddess 'Shakti'; shakti translates to, 𝘭𝘪𝘵.Power and strength) and relates it with a mother being the most important and ultimate God and all the creation is through her. Some Hindu traditions conceive God as androgynous (both female and male), or as either male or female, while cherishing gender henotheism, that is without denying the existence of other Gods in either gender.

Bhakti traditions of Hinduism have both gods and goddesses. In ancient and medieval Indian mythology, each masculine deva of the Hindu pantheon is partnered with a feminine devi. Followers of Shaktism, worship the goddess Devi as the embodiment of Shakti (feminine strength or power).

The popular misconception that there exist millions of Hindu deities, all the deities are personification of different aspects related to life and universe (God as trees, Ocean rivers, Mountains, Ocean, The Sun, The Moon, The 8 planets, The Milky way Galaxy, etc.). However, most, by far, are goddesses (Shakti, Devi, or mother), state Foulston and Abbott, suggesting "how important and popular goddesses are" in Hindu culture. Though in general, they are smaller, there are far more goddess temples than those of gods. Goddesses are most of the time, if not always seen as powerful, and when unmarried, seen as dangerous (to the evil). Despite the patriarchal nature of post modern Hindu society, women are seen as powerful alongside the Gods, and at certain times, dangerous. No one has a list of the millions of goddesses and gods, but all deities, state scholars, are typically viewed in Hinduism as "emanations or manifestation of gender-less principle called Brahman, representing the many facets of Ultimate Reality". In Hinduism, "God, the universe, all beings [male, female] and all else are essentially one thing," and are interconnected, depicting their oneness and the same god manifested in every being as Atman, the eternal Self.

Ancient and medieval Hindu literature, state scholars, is richly endowed with gods, goddesses and androgynous representations of God. This, states Gross, is in contrast with several monotheistic religions, where God is often synonymous with "He" and theism is replete with male anthropomorphisms. In Hinduism, goddess-imagery does not mean loss of male-god, rather the ancient literature presents the two genders as balancing each other and complementary. The Goddesses in Hinduism, states Gross, are strong, beautiful and confident, symbolizing their vitality in the cycle of life. While masculine Gods are symbolically represented as those who act, the feminine Goddesses are symbolically portrayed as those who inspire action. Goddesses in Hinduism are envisioned as the patrons of arts, culture, nurture, learning, arts, joys, spirituality and liberation.

== Practices ==
=== Marriage ===
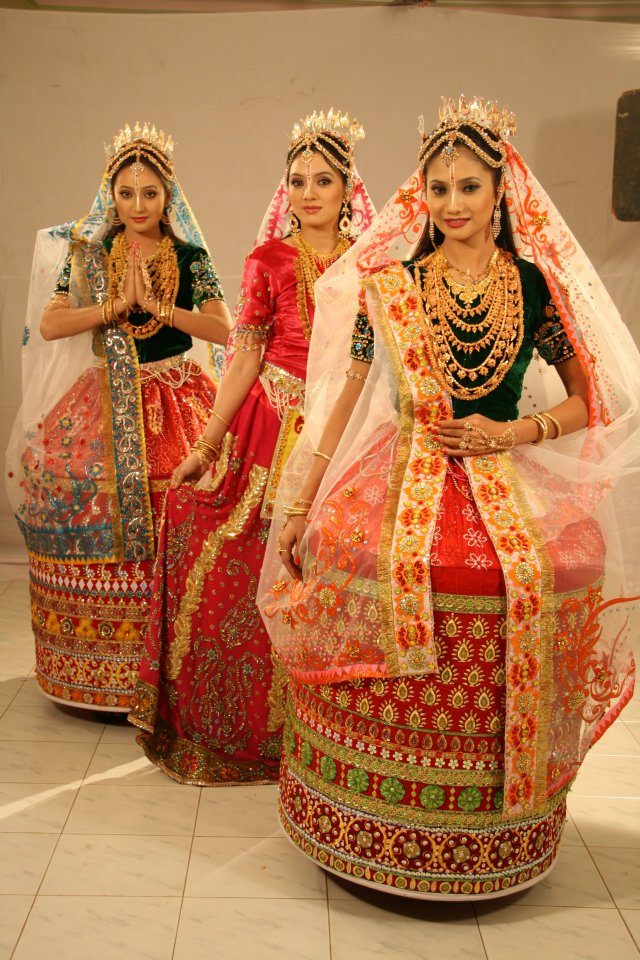
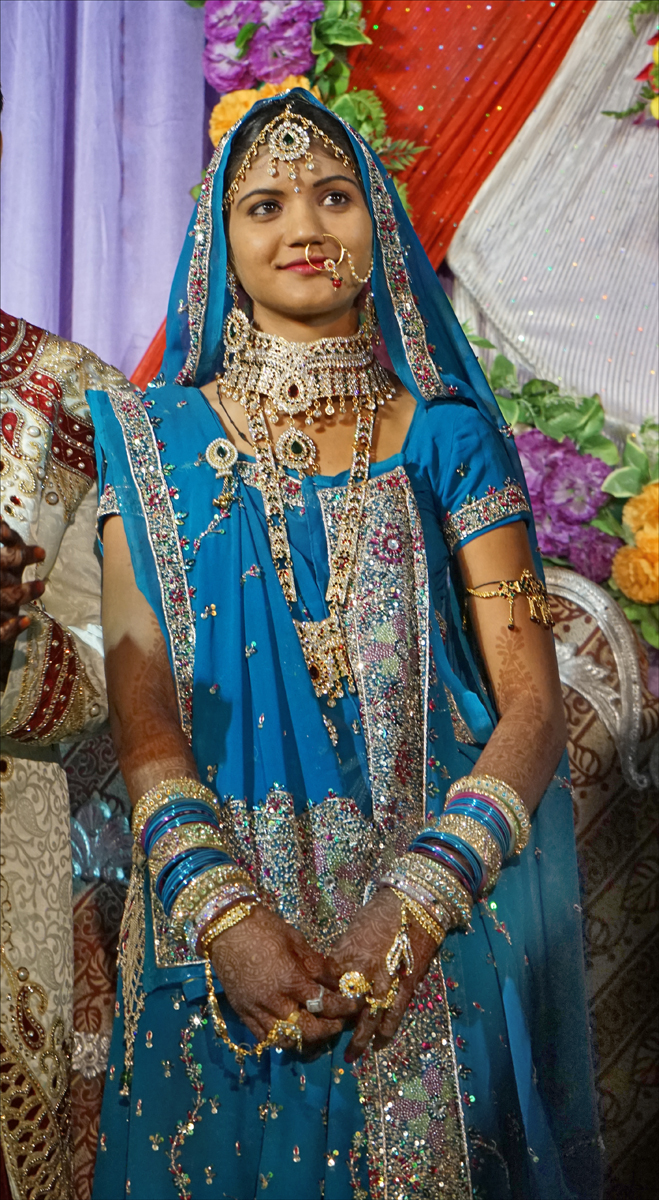
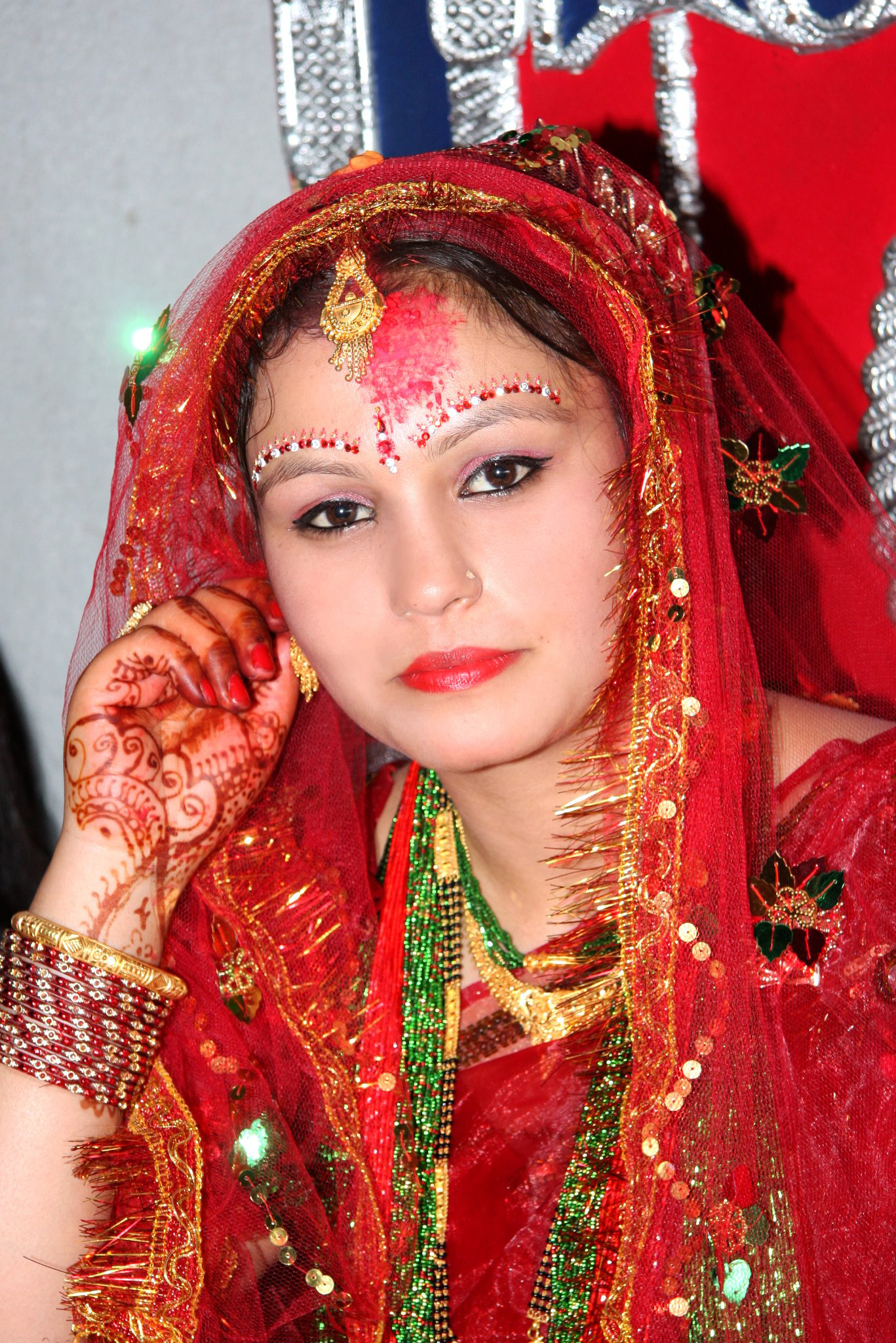
A wedding is one of the most significant personal ritual a Hindu woman undertakes in her life. The details and dress vary regionally among Hindu women, but share common ritual grammar. A Meitei Hindu bride in Manipur (left), an Amla Hindu bride in Madhya Pradesh (middle) and a Himalayan Hindu bride in Nepal (right).

The Veda stipulates specific mantras to be recited during a Hindu marriage ceremony. Alladi Mahadeva Sastri argues that these mantras demonstrate that 'according to the Veda, man and woman, when they are able to enter the married life, must be quite mature in mind and body'.

The Asvalayana Grhyasutra text of Hinduism identifies eight forms of marriages. Of these first four – Brahma, Daiva, Arsha and Prajapatya – are declared appropriate and recommended by the text, next two – Gandharva and Asura – are declared inappropriate but acceptable, and the last two – Rakshasa and Paishacha – are declared evil and unacceptable (but any children resulting were granted legal rights).

1. Brahma marriage – considered the religiously most appropriate marriage, where the father finds an educated man, proposes the marriage of his daughter to him. The groom, bride, and families willingly concur with the proposal. The two families and relatives meet, the girl is ceremoniously decorated, the father gifts away his daughter in betrothal, and a Vedic marriage ceremony is conducted. This type of wedding is now most prevalent among Hindus in modern India.
2. Daiva marriage – in this type of marriage, the father gives away his daughter along with ornaments to a priest.
3. Arsha marriage – in this type of marriage, the groom gives a cow and a bull to the father of the bride and the father exchanges his daughter in marriage. The groom took a vow to fulfill his obligations to the bride and family life (Grihasthashram).
4. Prajapatya marriage – in this type of marriage, a couple agree to get married by exchanging some Sanskrit mantras (vows to each other). This form of marriage was akin to a civil ceremony.
5. Gandharva marriage – in this type of marriage, the couple simply lives together out of love, by mutual consent, consensually consummating their relationship. This marriage is entered into without religious ceremonies, and was akin to the Western concept of Common-law marriage. Kama Sutra, as well as Rishi Kanva – the foster-father of Shakuntala – in the Mahabharata, claimed this kind of marriage to be an ideal one.
6. Asura marriage – in this type of marriage, the groom offered a dowry to the father of the bride and the bride, both accepted the dowry out of free will, and he received the bride in exchange. This was akin to marrying off a daughter for money. This marriage was considered inappropriate by Hindu Smriti-writers because greed, not what is best for the girl, can corrupt the selection process. Manusmriti verses 3.51 and 3.52, for example, states that a father or relatives must never accept any brideprice because that amounts to trafficking of the daughter.
7. Rakshasa marriage – where the groom forcibly abducted the girl against her and her family's will. The word Rakshasa means 'devil'.
8. Paishacha marriage – where the man rapes a woman when she is insentient, that is drugged or drunken or unconscious.

James Lochtefeld finds that the last two forms of marriage were forbidden yet recognized in ancient Hindu societies, not to encourage these acts, but to provide the woman and any children with legal protection in the society.

"A woman can choose her own husband after attaining maturity. If her parents are unable to choose a deserving groom, she can herself choose her husband." (Manu Smriti IX 90 - 91)

Will Durant (1885–1981) American historian says in his book Story of Civilization:

Women enjoyed far greater freedom in the Vedic period than in later India. She had more to say in the choice of her mate than the forms of marriage might suggest. She appeared freely at feasts and dances, and joined with men in religious sacrifice. She could study, and like Gargi, engage in philosophical disputation. If she was left a widow there were no restrictions upon her remarriage.

=== Dowry ===
The concept and practice of dowry in ancient and medieval Hindu society is unclear. Some scholars believe dowry was practiced in historic Hindu society, but some do not. Historical eyewitness reports (discussed below), suggest dowry in pre-11th century CE Hindu society was insignificant, and daughters had inheritance rights, which by custom were exercised at the time of her marriage.

Stanley J. Tambiah states the ancient Code of Manu sanctioned dowry and bridewealth in ancient India, but dowry was the more prestigious form and associated with the Brahmanic (priestly) caste. Bridewealth was restricted to the lower castes, who were not allowed to give dowry. He cites two studies from the early 20th century with data to suggest that this pattern of dowry in upper castes and bridewealth in lower castes has persisted through the first half of the 20th century.

Michael Witzel, in contrast, states the ancient Indian literature suggests dowry practices were not significant during the Vedic period. Witzel also notes that women in ancient India had property inheritance rights either by appointment or when they had no brothers. Kane states ancient literature suggests bridewealth was paid only in the asura-type of marriage that was considered reprehensible and forbidden by Manu and other ancient Indian scribes. Lochtefeld suggests that religious duties listed by Manu and others, such as 'the bride be richly adorned to celebrate marriage' were ceremonial dress and jewelry along with gifts that were her property, not property demanded by or meant for the groom; Lochtefeld further notes that bridal adornment is not currently considered as dowry in most people's mind.

Historical and epigraphical evidence from ancient India suggests dowry was not the standard practice in ancient Hindu society. Arrian of Alexander the Great's conquest era, in his first book, mentions a lack of dowry, or infrequent enough to be noticed by Arrian.

They (these ancient Indian people) make their marriages accordance with this principle, for in selecting a bride they care nothing whether she has a dowry and a handsome fortune, but look only to her beauty and other advantages of the outward person.

— Arrian, The Invasion of India by Alexander the Great, 3rd Century BCE

Arrian's second book similarly notes,

They (Indians) marry without either giving or taking dowries, but the women as soon as they are marriageable are brought forward by their fathers in public, to be selected by the victor in wrestling or boxing or running or someone who excels in any other manly exercise.

— Arrian, Indika, Megasthenes and Arrian, 3rd Century BCE

About 1200 years after Arrian's visit, Al-Biruni a Persian scholar who went and lived in India for 16 years in 11th century CE, wrote,

The implements of the wedding rejoicings are brought forward. No gift (dower or dowry) is settled between them. The man gives only a present to the wife, as he thinks fit, and a marriage gift in advance, which he has no right to claim back, but the (proposed) wife may give it back to him of her own will (if she does not want to marry).

— Al-Biruni, Chapter on Matrimony in India, about 1035 CE

=== Widowhood and remarriage ===
The Vedas maintain that widow remarriage was allowed, however various Dharmashastras have varying commentaries and views on the subject matter. The practice became restrictive over time. Historically, Hindu widows were expected to pursue a spiritual, ascetic life, particularly the higher castes such as Brahmins. Widows were not allowed to wear jewellery, they had to consume tasteless food, and they had to wear a white coarse saree without choli or blouse covering their breasts. Such restrictions are now strictly observed only by a small minority of widows, yet the belief continues that "a good wife predeceases her husband".

During the debate before the passage of the Hindu Widows' Remarriage Act, 1856, some communities asserted that it was their ancient custom that prohibited widow remarriage. Hindu scholars and colonial British authorities rejected this argument, states Lucy Carroll, because the alleged custom prohibiting widow remarriage was "far from ancient", and was already in practice among the Hindu communities such as the Rajbansi whose members had petitioned for the prohibition of widow remarriage. Thus, it failed the "customary law" protections under the British colonial era laws. However, this issue lingered in colonial courts for decades, because of the related issue of property left by the deceased husband, and whether the widow keeps or forfeits all rights to deceased Hindu husband's estate and thereby transfers the property from the deceased husband to her new husband. While Hindu community did not object to widow remarriage, it contested the property rights and transfer of property from her earlier husband's family to the later husband's family, particularly after the death of the remarried widow, in the 20th century.

=== Sati ===
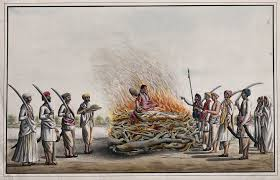
A Maharaj's soldiers preventing the escape of a widow from burning Pyre – painted by British artist

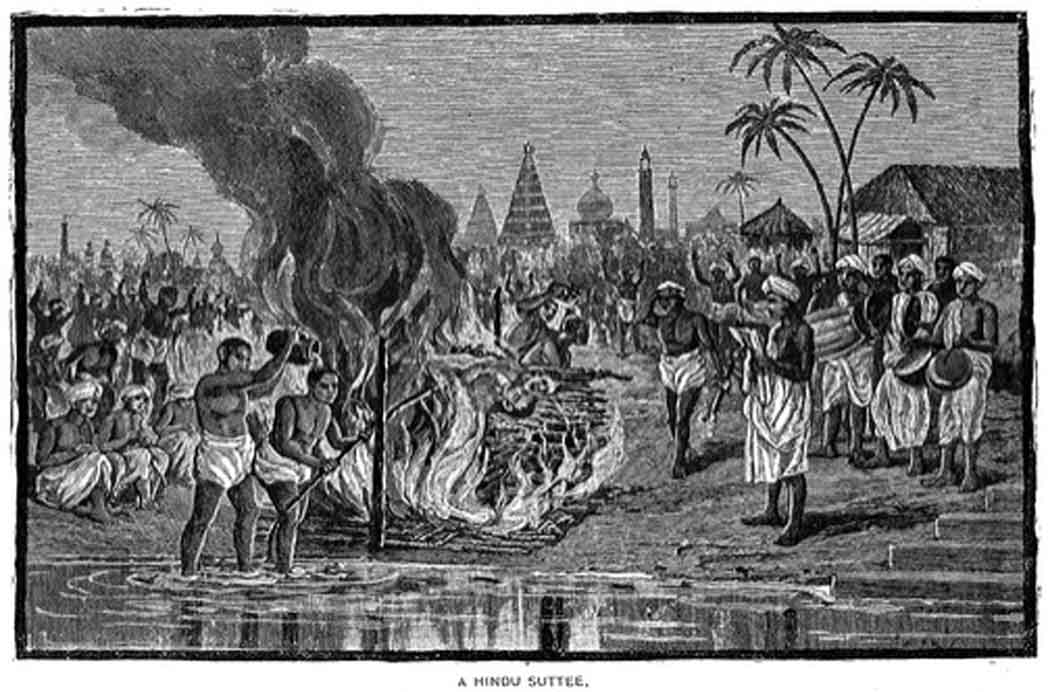
Sati, where a Hindu woman forced to commit suicide by burning herself with the corpse of her husband

Sati was an Indian funeral custom in which a widow was burned alive on her deceased husband's funeral pyre, either voluntarily, or because she felt she had no other satisfactory options to live. Michael Witzel states there is no evidence of Sati practice in ancient Indian literature during the Vedic period.

David Brick, in his 2010 review of ancient Indian literature, states:

There is no mention of Sahagamana (Sati) whatsoever in either Vedic literature or any of the early Dharmasutras or Dharmasastras. By "early Dharmasutras or Dharmasastras", I refer specifically to both the early Dharmasutras of Apastamba, Hiranyakesin, Gautama, Baudhayana and Vasistha, and the later Dharmasastras of Manu, Narada, and Yajnavalkya.

— David Brick, Yale University

The earliest scholarly discussion of Sati, whether it is right or wrong, is found in the Sanskrit literature dated to 10th- to 12th-century. The earliest known commentary on Sati by Medhātithi of Kashmir argues that Sati is a form of suicide, which is prohibited by the Vedic tradition. Vijñāneśvara, of the 12th-century Chalukya court, and the 13th-century Madhvacharya, argue that Sati should not to be considered suicide, which was otherwise variously banned or discouraged in the scriptures. They offer a combination of reasons, both in favor and against Sati. However, according to the textbook, "Religions in the Modern World", after the death of Roop Kanwar on her husband's funeral pyre in 1987, thousands saw this as cruel murder. Committing Sati was then made a crime, with consequences worse than murder.

Another historical practice observed among women in Hinduism, was the Rajput practice of Jauhar, particularly in Rajasthan and Madhya Pradesh, where they collectively committed suicide during war. They preferred death rather than being captured alive and dishonored by victorious Muslim soldiers in a war. According to Bose, jauhar practice grew in the 14th and 15th century with Hindu-Muslim wars of northwest India, where the Hindu women preferred death than the slavery or rape they faced if captured. Sati-style jauhar custom among Hindu women was observed only during Hindu-Muslim wars in medieval India, but not during internecine Hindu-Hindu wars among the Rajputs.

The Sati practice is considered to have originated within the warrior aristocracy in the Hindu society, gradually gaining in popularity from the 10th century CE and spreading to other groups from the 12th through 18th century CE. The earliest Islamic invasions of South Asia have been recorded from early 8th century CE, such as the raids of Muhammad bin Qasim, and major wars of Islamic expansion after the 10th century. This chronology has led to the theory that the increase in sati practice in India may be related to the centuries of Islamic invasion and its expansion in South Asia. Daniel Grey states that the understanding of origins and spread of Sati were distorted in the colonial era because of a concerted effort to push "problem Hindu" theories in the 19th and early 20th centuries.

=== Education ===
The Vedas and Upanishads mention girls could be a Brahmacharini, that is getting an education. Atharva Veda, for example, states

ब्रह्मचर्येण कन्या युवानं विन्दते पतिम् |

A youthful Kanya (कन्या, girl) who graduates from Brahmacharya, obtains a suitable husband.

— Atharva Veda, 11.5.18

The Harita Dharmasutra, a later era Hindu text states there are two kind of women: sadhyavadhu who marry without going to school, and the brahmavadini who go to school first to study the Vedas and speak of Brahman. The Hindu Sastras and Smritis describe varying number of Sanskara (rite of passage). Upanayana rite of passage symbolized the start of education process. Like the Vedas, the ancient Sutras and Shastra Sanskrit texts extended education right to women, and the girls who underwent this rite of passage then pursued studies were called Brahmavadini. Those who did not performed Upanayana ceremony at the time of their wedding. Instead of sacred thread, girls would wear their robe (now called sari or saree) in the manner of the sacred thread, that is over her left shoulder during this rite of passage.

=== Dress ===
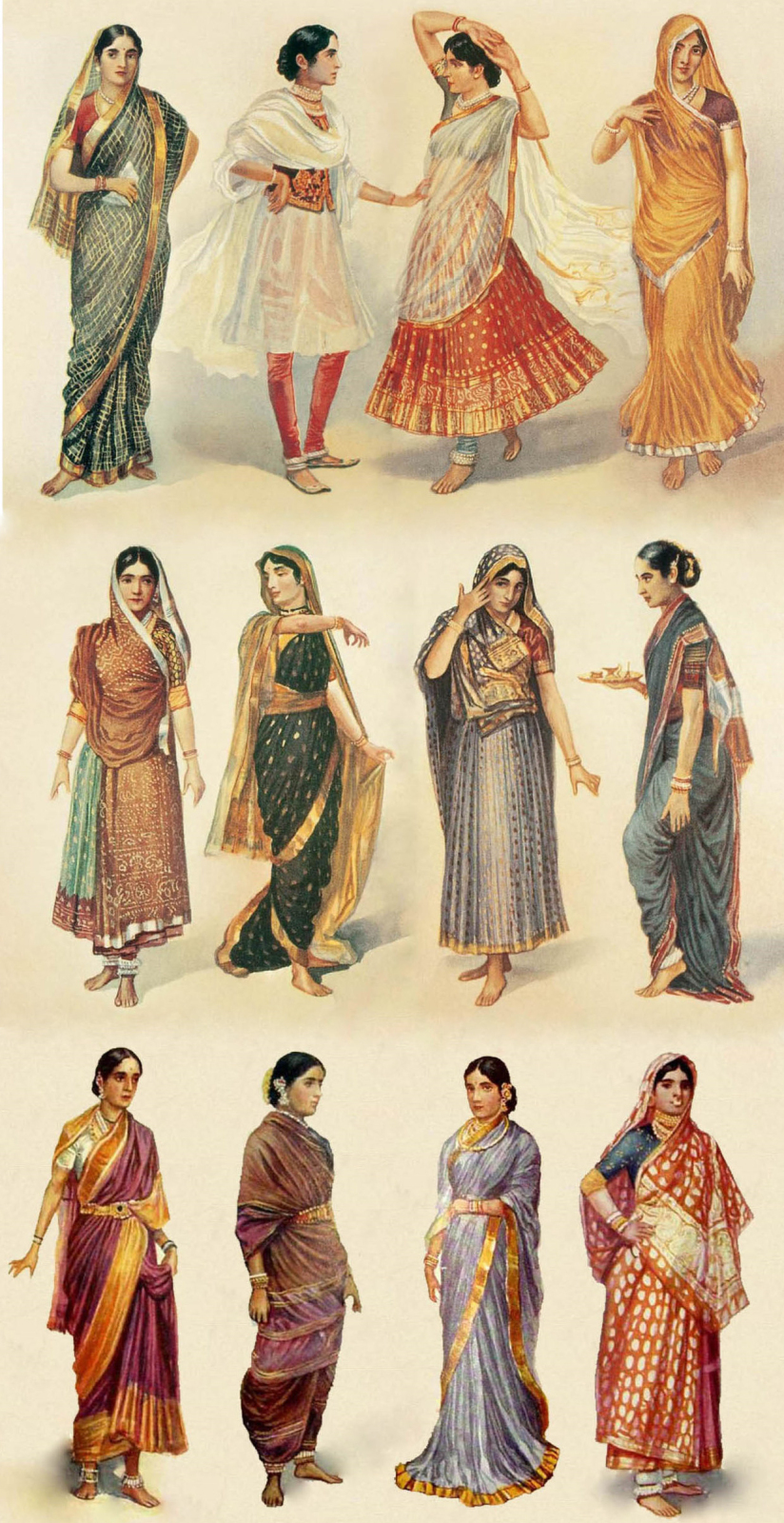
Sari in different styles (shown) has been traced to ancient Hindu traditions. In modern times, Sari is also found among non-Hindu women of South Asia.

Information on ancient and medieval era dressing traditions of women in Hinduism is unclear. Textiles are commonly mentioned in ancient Indian texts. The Arthashastra (~200 BCE to 300 CE) mentions a range of clothing and plant-based, muslin-based, wool-based textiles that are partially or fully dyed, knitted and woven. It is, however, uncertain how women wore these clothing, and scholars have attempted to discern the dress from study of murti (statues), wall reliefs, and ancient literature. In ancient and medieval Hindu traditions, covering the head or face was neither mandated nor common, but Ushnisha – a regional ceremonial occasion headdress is mentioned, as is Dupatta in colder, drier northern parts of Indian subcontinent.

Regardless of economic status, the costume of ancient Hindu women was formed of two separate sheets of cloth, one wrapping the lower part of the body, below the waist, and another larger wrap around piece called Dhoti (modern-day Saree) in texts. Although in some part of India, lower caste women have to keep their breast uncovered in front of upper caste people which signifies lower status.Upper caste women too used to bare their breasts in front the deity as respect. Some Murti and relief carvings suggest that pleats were used, probably to ease movement, but the pleats were tucked to reveal the contour of the body. However, where the pleats were tucked, front or side or back varied regionally. The predominant style observed in the ancient texts and artwork is the wrapping of the excess of the Dhoti from right waist over the left shoulder, in the Vedic Upanayana style. The breasts were covered with a stitched, tight fitting bodice named Kurpasaka (Sanskrit: कूर्पासक) or Stanamsuka (Sanskrit: स्तनांशुक), but this was not common in extreme south India or in eastern states such as Orissa and Bengal. Regional variations were great, to suit local weather and traditions, in terms of the length, number of pleats, placement of pleats, style of bodice used for bosom, and the dimension or wrapping of the upper excess length of the Dhoti. Greek records left by those who came to India with Alexander the Great mention that head and neck ornaments, ear rings, wrist and ankle ornaments were commonly worn by women.

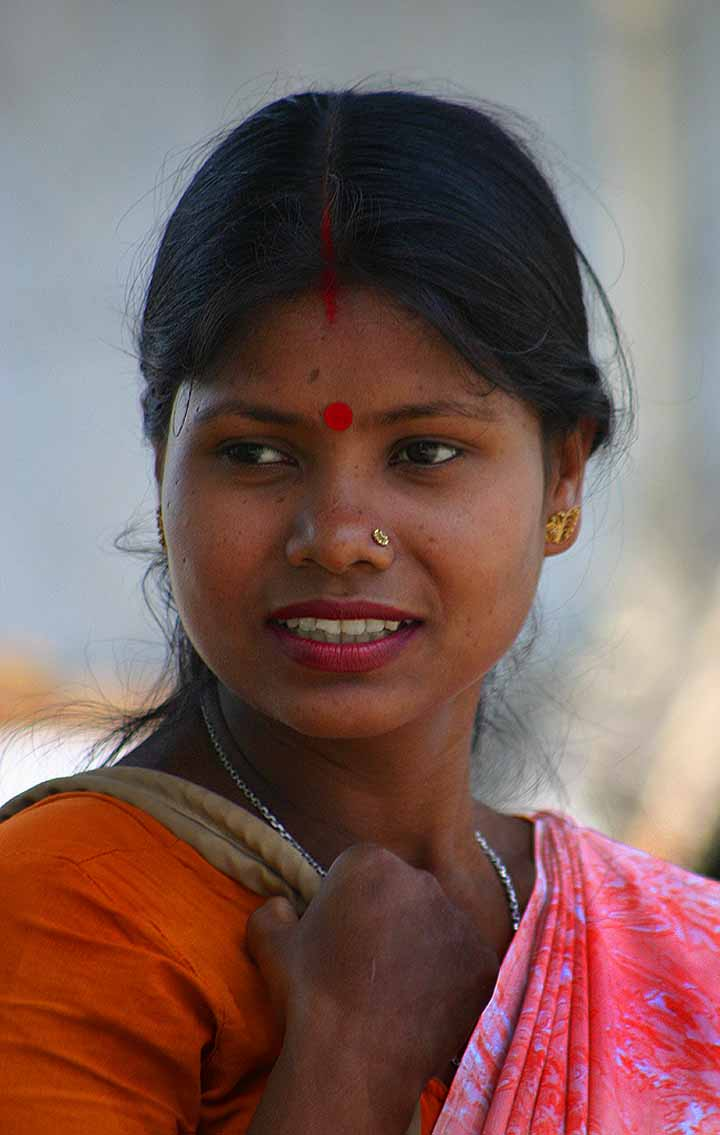
A Hindu woman, with Sindur in her hair and Bindi on forehead, customs also found among women in Jainism

Usually, the sari consists of a piece of cloth around 6 yards long, wrapped distinctly based on the prior mentioned factors. The choice of the quality and sophistication of the cloth is dependent on the income and affordability. Women across economic groups in colonial era, for example, wore a single piece of cloth in hot and humid Bengal. It was called Kapod by poorer women, while the more ornate version of the same was called a Saree. The material and cost varied, but nature was the same across income and social groups (caste/class) of Hindu women.

Sindoor or Kumkum has been a marker for women in Hinduism, since early times. A married Hindu woman typically wears a red pigment (vermilion) in the parting of her hair, while a never married, divorced or a widowed woman does not. A Hindu woman may wear a Bindi (also called Tip, Bindiya, Tilaka or Bottu) on her forehead. This represents the place of the inner eye, and signifies that she is spiritually turned inwards. In the past, this was worn by married women, but in the modern era, it is a fashion accessory and has no relation to the marital status for women in Hinduism.

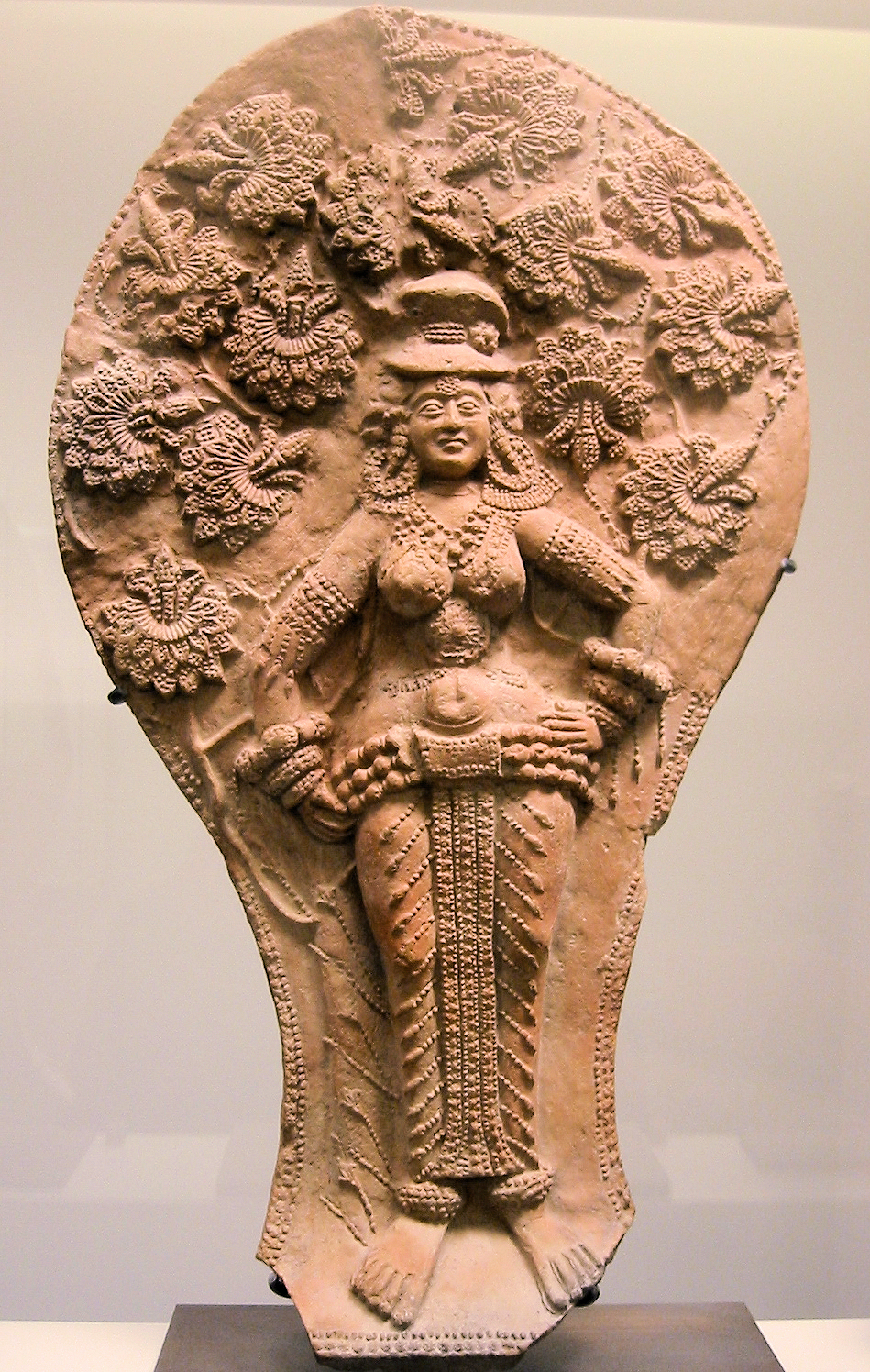
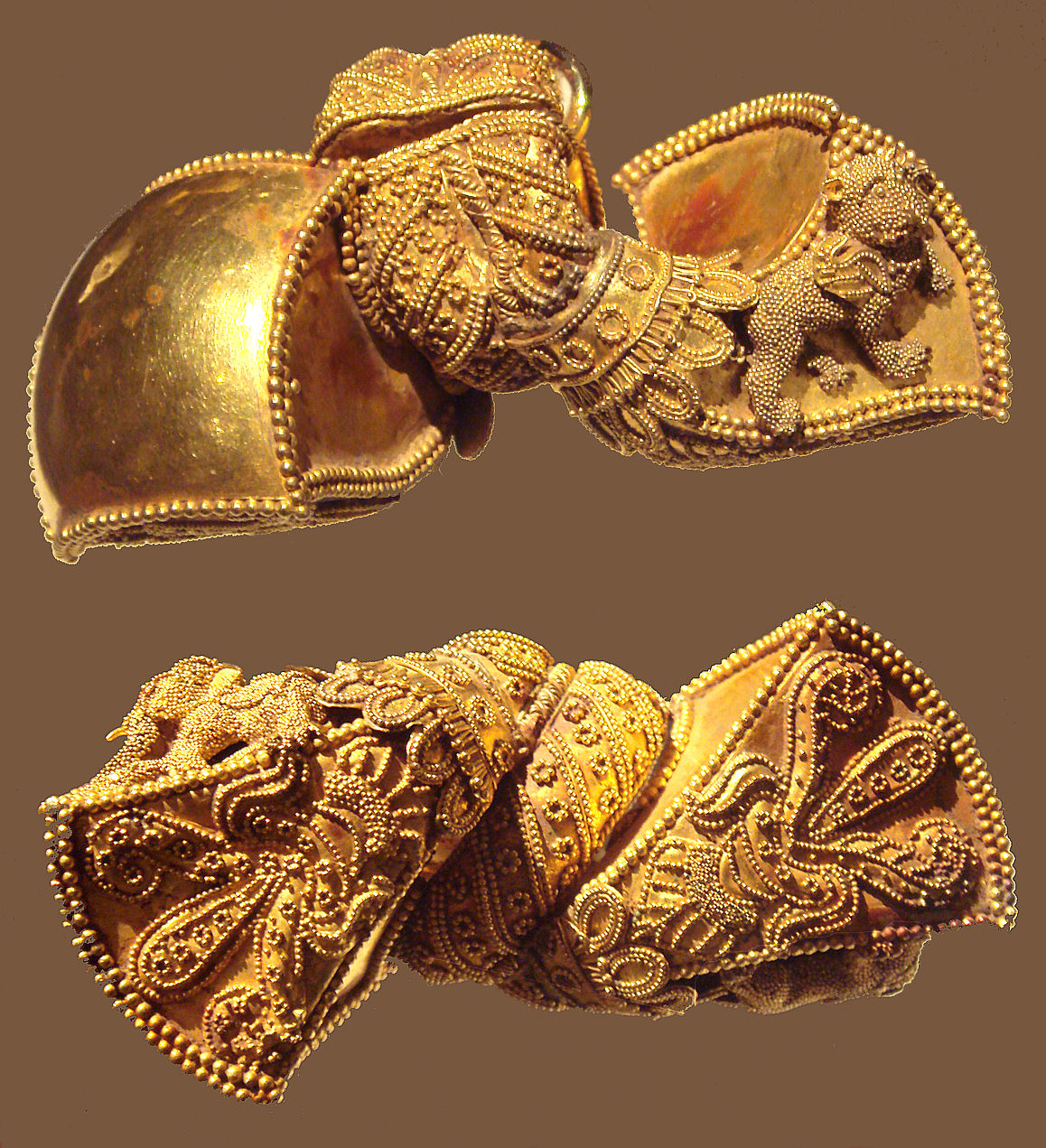
A 1st-century BCE Indian sculpture showing female Yakshi dress (left). Earrings from India, 1st-century BCE (right). Greek texts suggest ancient Hindu women wearing ornaments.

Cultural customs such as Sindoor are similar to wedding ring in other cultures. Regionally, Hindu women may wear seasonal fresh flowers in their hair, during festivals, temple visits or other formal occasions. White color saree is common with aging widows, while red or other festive colors with embroidery is more common on festivals or social ceremonies such as weddings. These Hindu practices are cultural practices, and not required by its religious texts. Hinduism is a way of life, is diverse, has no binding book of rules of its faith, nor any that mandate any dress rules on Hindu women. The choice is left to the individual discretion.

Other ornaments worn by Hindu women are sometimes known as solah singar (sixteen decorations): "bindi, necklaces, earrings, flowers in the hair, rings, bangles, armlets (for the upper arm), waistbands, ankle-bells, kohl (or kajal – mascara), toe rings, henna, perfume, sandalwood paste, the upper garment, and the lower garment".

Bernard Cohn (2001) states that clothing in India, during the colonial British era, was a form of authority exercised to highlight hierarchical patterns, subordination, and authoritative relations. Hindus in India were subject to rule under a range of other religious reigns, therefore influencing clothing choices. This was exemplified by a change in attire as a result of Mughal influence and later European influence resulting from British rule.

=== Arts: dance, drama, music, poetry ===
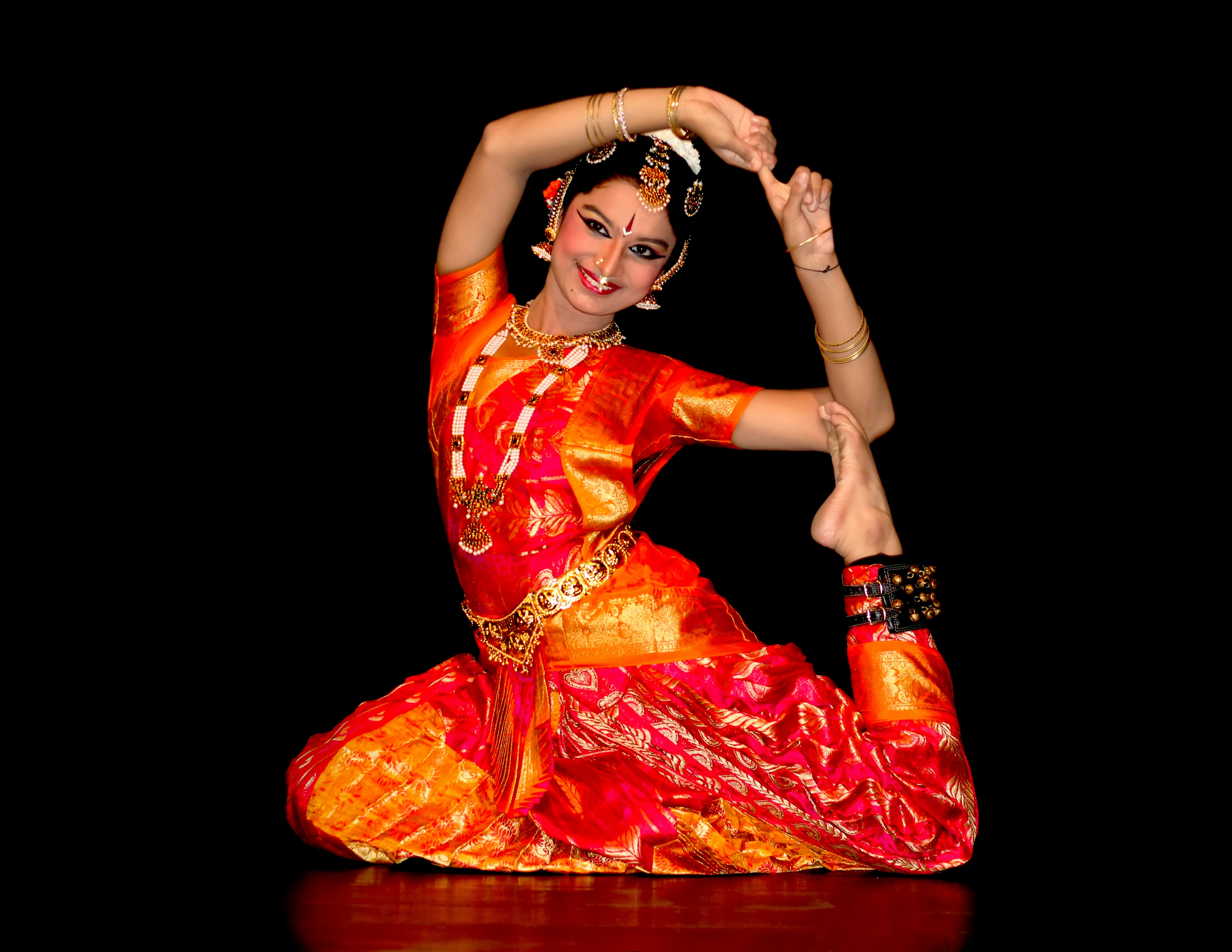
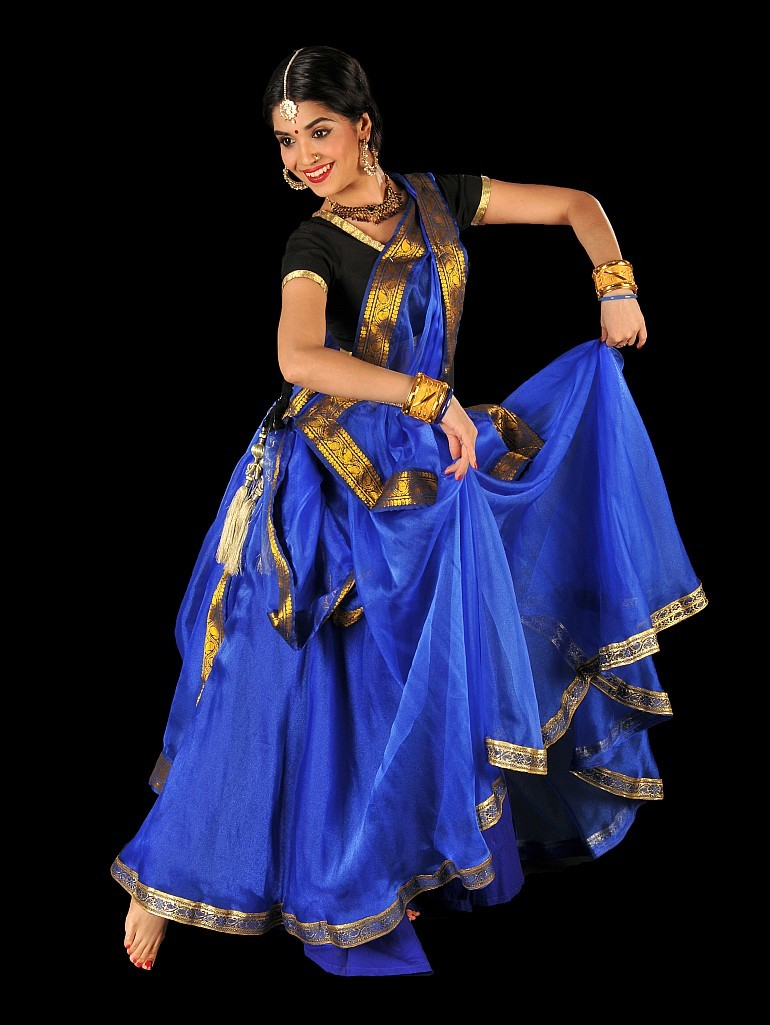
Many classical Indian dances such as Bharathanatyam and Kathak were developed by women in Hinduism.

Hindu religious art encompasses performance arts as well as visual art, and women have been expressed in Hindu arts as prominently as men. Sanskrit literature has contributed to religious and spiritual expression of women, by its reverence for goddesses. The deity for arts, music, poetry, speech, culture, and learning is goddess Saraswati in the Hindu tradition. Baumer states that the resulting Sanskrit Theater has its origins in the Vedas, stemming from three principles: “The cosmic man (purusha), the self (atman), and the universal being (brahman)". Some of the earliest references to women being active in dance, music and artistic performance in Hindu texts is found in 1st millennium BCE Taittiriya Samhita chapter 6.1 and 8th-century BCE Shatapatha Brahmana chapter 3.2.4. In religious ceremonies, such as the ancient Shrauta and Grihya sutras rituals, texts by Panini, Patanjali, Gobhila and others state that women sang hymns or uttered mantras along with men during the yajnas.

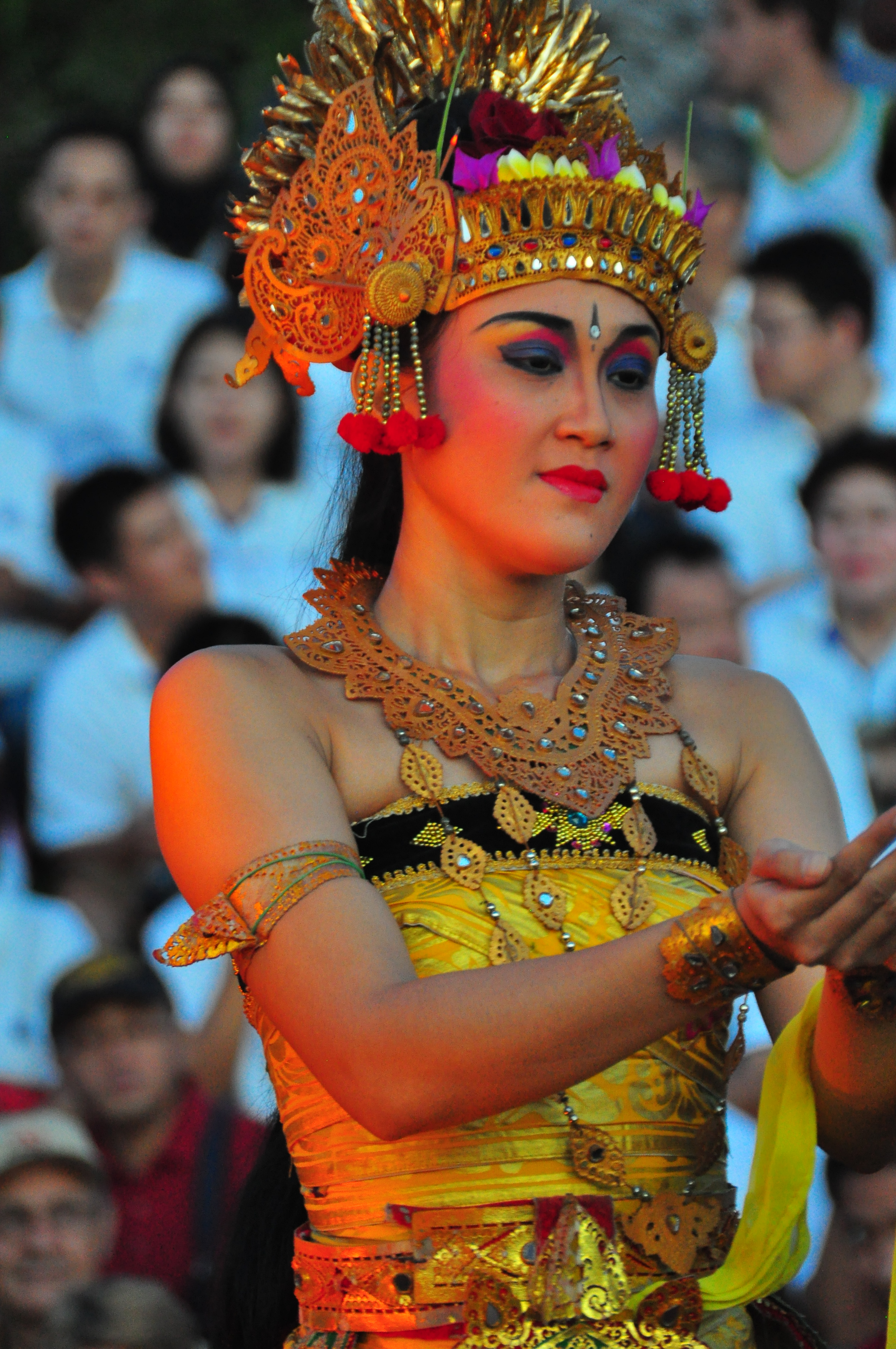
A Hindu woman in a dance pose Bali Indonesia

Music and dance, states Tracy Pintchman, are "intertwined in Hindu traditions", and women in Hinduism have had an active creative and performance role in this tradition. While Hinduism gives women all the rights certain cultural aspects of the social traditions of Hindu society curtailed the freedoms of women too, although they also gave opportunities to create and express arts. The historical evidence, states Pintchman, suggests that the opportunities to create and participate in arts were available to women regardless of their caste or class. Classical vocal music was more prevalent among women upper classes, while public performances of arts such as dance were more prevalent among women in matrilineal Hindu traditions, particularly the Devadasi.

The Devadasi tradition women practiced their arts in a religious context. Young Devadasi women were trained in the arts of music, theater, and dance, and their lives revolved around Hindu temples. In south India, some of these women were courtesans, while others chaste. In 1909, the colonial government passed the first law banning the Devadasis practice in the state of Mysore; however, an attempt to ban Devadasis tradition in Tamil Nadu Hindu temples failed in Madras Presidency in 1927. In 1947, the government of Madras passed legislation forbidding Devadasi practices under pressure from activists that this was a 'prostitution' tradition. However, the tradition was revived by those who consider it to be a 'nun' tradition wherein a Devadasi was a chaste woman who considered herself married to God and used temple dance tradition to raise funds as well as helped continue the arts.

In poetry, 9th-century Andal became a well-known Bhakti movement poet, states Pintchman, and historical records suggest that by the 12th century she was a major inspiration to Hindu women in south India and elsewhere. Andal continues to inspire hundreds of classical dancers in modern times choreographing and dancing Andal's songs. Andal is also called Goda, and her contributions to the arts have created Goda Mandali (circle of Andal) in the Vaishnava tradition. Many other women, such as Nagaatnammal, Balasaraswati, and Rukmini, states Pintchman, were instrumental in bringing "Carnatic music and Bharat Natyam to the public stage and making the performing arts accessible by the general public" by the 12th century. Gathasaptasati is an anthology of Subhashita genre of poetry, from the first half of 1st millennium CE, many of which are attributed to Hindu women in central and western India.

16th-century Mirabai is among the most well known Hindu women saints devoted to Krishna. Also a part of the Bhakti movement, her life and work illustrate bhakti transcending caste, class, and gender boundaries.

=== Menstruation ===
In Hinduism, menstruating women are traditionally advised rules to follow. Menstruation is seen as a period of purification, and women are often separated from place of worship or any object pertaining to it, for the length of their period. This forms the basis of most of the cultural practices and restrictions around menstruation in Hinduism. The origin of the myth of menstrual impurity originated in the Vedic period, linked to Indra's slaying of Vritras; in the Veda that "guilt", of killing a brahmana-murder, appears every month as menstrual flow of women had taken upon themselves a part of Indra's guilt.

== Context: historical and modern developments ==
The role of women in Hinduism dates back to 3000 years of history, states Pechelis, incorporating ideas of Hindu philosophy, that is Prakrti (matter, femaleness) and Purusha (consciousness, maleness), coming together to interact and produce the current state of the universe. Hinduism considers the connection, interdependence, and complementary nature of these two concepts – Prakriti and Purusha, female and male – as the basis of all existence, which is a starting point of the position of women in Hindu traditions.

Although these ancient texts are the foundation upon which the position of women in Hinduism is founded, Hindu women participated in and were affected by cultural traditions and celebrations such as festivals, dance, arts, music and other aspects of daily life. Despite these liberating undercurrents emerging in its historical context, Sugirtharajah states that there is some reluctance to use the term "feminism" to describe historical developments in Hinduism.

In the colonial era 1800s, Hindu women were described by European scholars as being "naturally chaste" and "more virtuous" than other women.

In 20th-century history context, the position of women in Hinduism and more generally India, has many contradictions. Regional Hindu traditions are organized as matriarchal societies (such as in south India and northeast India), where the woman is the head of the household and inherits the wealth; yet, other Hindu traditions are patriarchal. God as a woman, and mother goddess ideas are revered in Hinduism, yet there are rituals that treats the female in a subordinate role.

The women's rights movement in India, states Sharma, have been driven by two foundational Hindu concepts – lokasangraha and satyagraha. Lokasangraha is defined as “acting for the welfare of the world” and satyagraha “insisting on the truth”. These ideals were used to justify and spur movements among women for women's rights and social change through a political and legal process. Fane remarks, in her article published in 1975, that it is the underlying Hindu beliefs of "women are honored, considered most capable of responsibility, strong" that made Indira Gandhi culturally acceptable as the prime minister of India, yet the country has in the recent centuries witnessed the development of diverse ideologies, both Hindu and non-Hindu, that has impacted the position of women in India. The women rights movement efforts, states Young, have been impeded by the "growing intensity of Muslim separatist politics", the divergent positions of Indian Hindu women seeking separation of religion and women's rights, secular universal laws (uniform civil code) applicable irrespective of religion, while Indian Muslim community seeking to preserve Sharia law in personal, family and other domains.

=== Western scholarship ===
There has been a pervasive and deeply held belief in modern era Western scholarship, states Professor Kathleen Erndl, that "in Hinduism, women are universally subjugated and that feminism, however, it might be defined, is an artifact of the West". Postmodern scholars question whether they have "unwittingly accepted" this colonial stereotype and long-standing assumption, particularly given the emerging understanding of Hindu Shakti tradition-related texts, and empirical studies of women in rural India who have had no exposure to Western thought or education but assert their Hindu (or Buddhist) goddess-inspired feminism.

Western feminism, states Vasudha Narayanan, has focussed on negotiating "issues of submission and power as it seeks to level the terrains of opportunity" and uses a language of "rights". In Hinduism, the contextual and cultural word has been Dharma, which is about "duties" to oneself, to others, among other things. There has been a gap between Western books describing Hinduism and women's struggle within the Hindu tradition based on texts that the colonial British era gave notoriety to, versus the reality of Hindu traditions and customs that did not follow these texts at all. Narayanan describes it as follows (abridged),

Many [Western] scholars point out quite correctly that women are accorded a fairly low status in the Hindu texts that deal with law and ethics (Dharma Shastra), what is not usually mentioned is that these texts were not well known and utilized in many parts of Hindu India. Custom and practice were far more important than the dictates of these legal texts. There were many legal texts and they were not in competition with each other; they were written at different times in different parts of the country, but all of them were superseded by local custom. (...) There is a sense of dissonance between scripture and practice in certain areas of dharma, and the role of women and Sudras sometimes falls in this category. Manu may have denied independence to women, but there were women of some castes and some economic classes who endowed money to temples. It is important to note that there is no direct correlation that one can generalize on between these texts and women's status, rights or behavior.

— Vasudha Narayanan, Feminism and World Religions

Ancient and medieval era Hindu texts, and epics, discuss a woman's position and role in society over a spectrum, such as one who is a self-sufficient, marriage-eschewing powerful Goddess, to one who is subordinate and whose identity is defined by men rather than her, and to one who sees herself as a human being and spiritual person while being neither feminine nor masculine. The 6th-century Devi Mahatmya text, for example, states Cynthia Humes, actually shares "the postmodern exaltation of embodiedness, divinizing it as does much of the Western feminist spirituality movement". These texts are not theoretical nor disconnected from the lives of women in the historic Hindu society, but the verses assert that all "women are portions of the divine goddess", states Humes. The Hindu goddess tradition inspired by these texts has been, notes Pintchman, one of the richest, compelling traditions worldwide, and its followers flock villages, towns, and cities all over India. Yet, adds Humes, other texts describe her creative potential not in her terms, but using the words of male virility and gendered dichotomy, possibly encouraging the heroic woman to abandon her female persona and impersonate the male.

Postmodern empirical scholarship about Hindu society, states Rita Gross, makes one question whether and to what extent there is pervasiveness of patriarchy in Hinduism. Patriarchal control is real, and the Hindu society admits this of itself, states Gross, yet the Hindu culture distinguishes between authority – which men hold, and power – which both men and women hold. Women in the Hindu tradition have the power, and they exercise that power to take control of situations that are important to them. The Goddess theology and humanity in the Hindu texts are a foundation of these values, a form that is not feminist by Western definition, but is feminist nevertheless, one with an empowering and self-liberating value structure with an added spiritual dimension that resonates with Hindu (and Buddhist) goddesses.

Kathleen Erndl states that texts such as Manusmriti do not necessarily portray what women in Hinduism were or are, but it represents an ideology, and that "the task of Hindu feminists is to rescue Shakti from its patriarchal prison". Her metaphor, explains Erndl, does not mean that Shakti never was free nor that she is tightly locked up now, because patriarchy is neither monolithic nor ossified in Hindu culture. The Shakti concept and associated extensive philosophy in Hindu texts provide a foundation to both spiritual and social liberation.

== See also ==
- Durga Puja
- List of female Hindu mystics
- Hindu Widows' Remarriage Act, 1856
- Women in Buddhism
- Women in Sikhism
- Women in Judaism
- Women in Christianity
- Women in Islam
- Women in Mormonism
- Yoga for women
- Yogini
