= Devlok with Devdutt Pattanaik =

- Genre: Indian mythology
- Presented by: Devdutt Pattanaik and Rasika Dugal
- Country of origin: India
- Original language: Hindi
- No. of seasons: 3
- No. of episodes: 73

Production
- Production company: Epic Channel Networks Pvt. Ltd.

Original release
- Network: EPIC
- Release: 21 October 2015 – present

Devlok with Devdutt Pattanaik is an Indian Hindi television series which airs on the EPIC channel. The show is based on Indian mythology and is presented by mythologist Devdutt Pattanaik. The show highlights characters, stories, events and symbols in a story of Indian mythology. Devdutt Pattanaik attempts to demystify and 'decode' the folklore and traditions that accompany Indian mythology. It is available on EPIC On, EPIC TV's streaming platform.

== Show summary ==
The show is a tête-à-tête between the host and the presenters, Rasika Dugal, Himanshi Choudhry and mythologist Devdutt Pattanaik.

In Devlok, Devdutt Pattanaik tries to redefine mythology as something that is indifferent to rationality.

In each episode, Devdutt covers one phenomenon from the texts. From the concept of the Holy Triad – Brahma, Vishnu and Shiva – to the different avatars of the Goddess Durga. The series premiered on the EPIC channel on 21 October 2015 with 26 episodes. The second season of the show started on 11 July 2016 with 30 episodes, hosted by Rasika Dugal.

== Episode themes ==
In Devlok, Devdutt attempts to answer mythology questions – fiction or non-fiction, religion or tradition, fantasy or history. He talks about the origins and evolution of various concepts through stories. In his own style, Devdutt also puts these stories into a modern-day context, explaining their relevance for our lives.

== Cast ==
- Devdutt Pattanaik as storyteller
- Rasika Duggal as presenter
- Himanshi Choudhry as Presenter
- Athar Siddiqui as Yudhishtra
- Sorabh Chauhan as Narad Muni
- Ujjwal Gauraha as Hanuman
