= The Pregnant King =

2008 book by Devdutt Pattanaik

The Pregnant King is a 2008 book by Devdutt Pattanaik. It follows the story of Yuvanashva, a childless king, who accidentally drinks a fertility aid intended for his queens. It is set in the backdrop of the Mahabharata and makes references to characters and incidents in the battle of Kurukshetra as well as the Ramayana.

Pattanaik had previously written several books on myths and rituals, but The Pregnant King is his first work of fiction. It is a retelling of the Yuvanashva sub-story within the Mahabharata, combined with original fiction. The novel examines gender roles, the blurring of lines between parental duties and the malleability of Dharma to fit a given situation.

== Synopsis ==
King Yuvanashva is the well-liked ruler of Vallabhi: an obedient son, a devoted husband who aspires to be just towards all and uphold Dharma in his kingdom. The epic battle of Kurukshetra is imminent but the king's mother, Shilavati, refuses to consent to war until Yuvanashva sires an heir. Despite all efforts, no child is born, and the king seeks the help of the two Siddhis, Yaja and Upayaja. Yuvanahva seemingly unintentionally drinks the potion they craft for his wives and ends up pregnant himself. The incident is hidden from all but his wife, Shilavati and Asanga, the healer. After the child, Mandhata, is born, he successfully impregnates his second wife, Pulomi. Yuvanashva, who has lived his whole life by the code of Dharma, begins to question his gender identity and longs to be called "mother" by his son.

Woven throughout are the stories of other characters who subvert expectations for gender and sexuality. Shilavati was widowed at a young age and became regent but, as a woman, was not permitted to keep the throne. Somvat and Sumedha, two childhood friends, decide to get married despite being men. Sthunakarna, a yaksha, temporarily gives up his manhood for the prince Shikhandi. Arjuna, the great warrior with many wives served as a dance teacher to princess of Vidarbha Adi-natha, the teacher of teachers, is worshipped as a hermit by Yaja and an enchantress by Upayaja. Ileshwar Mahadev becomes a God on full moon days and a Goddess on new moon nights.

== Adaptations ==
The book was adapted into a 2015 play, Flesh, by director and script writer Kaushik Bose, produced by Theatreworms Productions.

== See also ==
- Myth=Mithya: A Handbook of Hindu Mythology
