= Sati Savitri: And Other Feminist Stories They Don't Tell You =

Non-fiction book by Devdutt Pattanaik

- Author: Devdutt Pattanaik
- Language: English
- Subject: Mythology, feminism
- Genre: Non-fiction
- Publisher: Penguin Books India
- Publication date: March 2024
- Publication place: India
- Media type: Print (paperback)
- Pages: 256
- ISBN: 9780143467588

Sati Savitri: And Other Feminist Stories They Don't Tell You (often shortened to Sati Savitri) is a 2024 non-fiction book by Indian mythologist Devdutt Pattanaik. The book collects retellings and interpretations of stories from Hindu, Buddhist and Jain traditions that highlight women's agency, choice and alternative models of femininity within South Asian mythic traditions.

== Contents and themes ==
The book challenges popular cultural stereotypes surrounding mythology and its characters. Pattanaik argues that mythology is often treated as fixed doctrine or literal history, whereas it functions as a flexible narrative system shaped by social context and interpretation.

A central theme of the book is the reinterpretation of female figures such as Sati and Savitri. Pattanaik notes that these women are frequently reduced in modern usage to symbols of obedience or self-sacrifice, while mythological narratives portray them as individuals who actively make choices, negotiate power and act with agency. Savitri, in particular, is presented not as a passive wife but as a figure who confronts death through intelligence and determination.

The book also reflects the idea that Indian mythological traditions contain multiple and sometimes contradictory strands, including both patriarchal and empowering narratives. By revisiting myths through this plural lens, the work seeks to dismantle simplified moral readings and encourage an understanding of mythological characters as complex and context-dependent rather than fixed archetypes.

== Reception ==
Mainstream coverage around the book focused on Pattanaik's stated aim of bringing out lesser-told, empowering stories about women from South Asian traditions. In an interview with the Deccan Chronicle Pattanaik described the collection as one that highlights stories where women exercise choice, noting that the Savitri story — often invoked as an ideal of wifely devotion — can be read as an account of a woman who "outwits death and saves a man."

An NDTV video feature and interview presented Pattanaik explaining how the book "breaks" common myths about Sati and Savitri and highlights agency in women characters from mythology.

The book has also featured in recent student papers and survey articles that examine modern reworkings of myth and the construction of feminist readings of traditional narratives. Scholarly reviews and comparative pieces have used Pattanaik's retellings to discuss continuity and change in representations of women in Indian epic and Puranic literature.

== Editions ==
- Pattanaik, Devdutt. Sati Savitri: And Other Feminist Stories They Don't Tell You. Penguin Books India. Published: March 2024. 256 pages. ISBN 9780143467588.

== See also ==
- Women in Hinduism
