= Devdutt Pattanaik =

Indian mythologist and writer (born 1970)

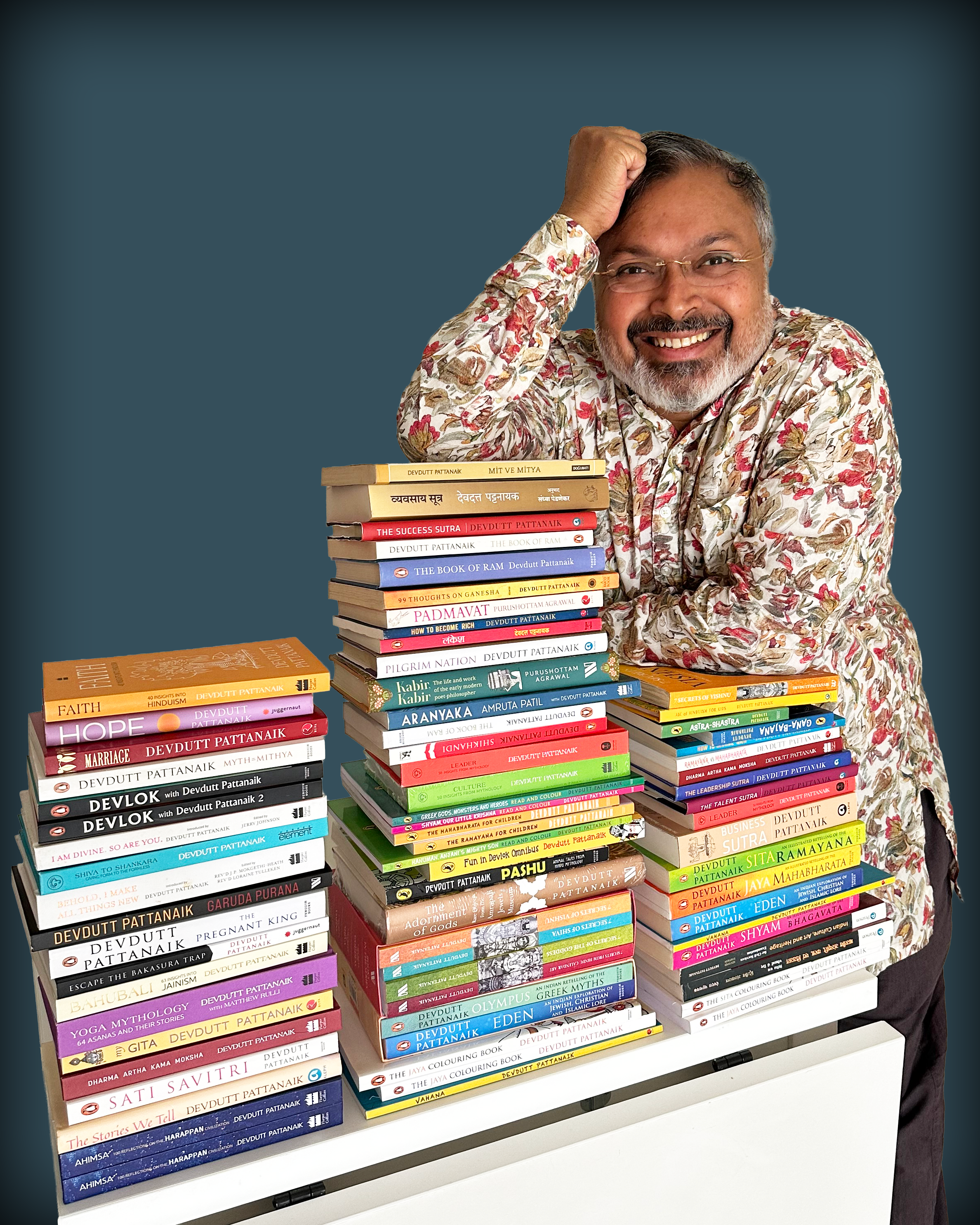
- Pattanaik with his books
- Born: 11 December 1970 (age 55); Mumbai, India
- Education: MBBS (Grant Medical College); Postgraduate Diploma in Comparative Mythology (University of Bombay)
- Occupations: Mythologist, writer, columnist, illustrator
- Known for: Works on Indian mythology
- Devdutt Pattanaik's voice Recorded January 2018
- Website: www.Devdutt.com

Signature
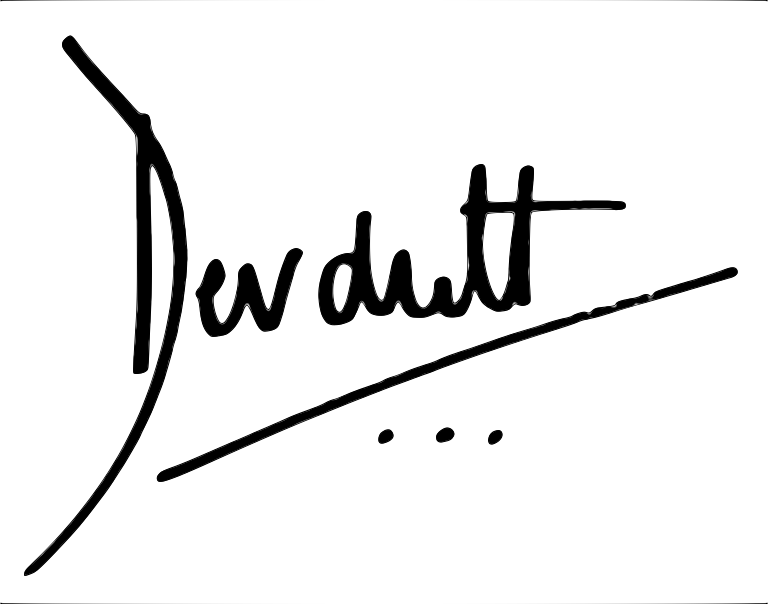

Devdutt Pattanaik is an Indian mythologist, writer, illustrator, and speaker known for explaining the relevance of Indian and World mythology in modern times, especially in management, leadership, and culture. A medical doctor by qualification, with a 15-year career in the healthcare and pharma industries, he has written over 50 books and 1,500 newspaper columns on these topics. His popular books including Jaya: An Illustrated Retelling of the Mahabharata, Business Sutra, and Escape the Bakasura Trap: Let Contentment Fuel Your Growth. His TV shows include Devlok with Devdutt Pattanaik and Business Sutra. He also consults organisations and media on art, cultural heritage, storytelling and Indian Knowledge Systems.

== Early life and education ==
Devdutt Pattanaik was born and raised in Mumbai. His mother is Sabitri Pattanaik & father is Prafulla Kumar Pattanaik. He spent his childhood and student life in Chembur, Mumbai.

He went to Our Lady of Perpetual Succour High School in Ghatkopar, and graduated in medicine (M.B.B.S.) from Grant Medical College, Mumbai, he subsequently obtained a diploma in Comparative Mythology from Mumbai University.

== Career ==
Devdutt worked in the pharmaceutical and healthcare industry (Sanofi Aventis and Apollo Group of Hospitals, respectively) for 14 years and spent his spare time writing articles and books on mythology, which eventually became his full-time profession. His first book Shiva: An Introduction was published in 1997. Devdutt illustrates his own books.

He served as Chief Belief Officer for the Future Group.

He was a speaker at the first TED conference in India held in November 2009.

Devdutt has consulted Star TV network on mythological television series like Mahabharata, Siya Ke Ram and Vighnaharta Sri Ganesha; these serials have challenged conventional views of the narratives and opened up new avenues of interpretation. In the latter serial he added the narrative of Lord Jagannatha & Puri since he is an Oriya.

He has also been the story consultant at Indian television network Star TV, where Devon Ke Dev...Mahadev is based on his work.

In 2015, Devdutt presented the Hindi television series Devlok with Devdutt Pattanaik on the "EPIC ON" channel. In the show, he attempts to demystify and decode the folklore and traditions that accompanies Indian mythology. In December 2016, he made "his debut on the Forbes India Celeb 100 list, on the 93rd spot."

Devdutt worked on Audible Originals (India)'s audiobook titled Suno Mahabharat Devdutt Pattanaik ke Saath and Revisiting Mahabharata with Devdutt Pattanaik. In his show he talks about the details of the war in the Mahabharata, how it affected the world, and what happened to India after the death of the Pandavas and the Kauravas. He also communicates the Vedic tenets which describes karma and dharma.

== Art ==
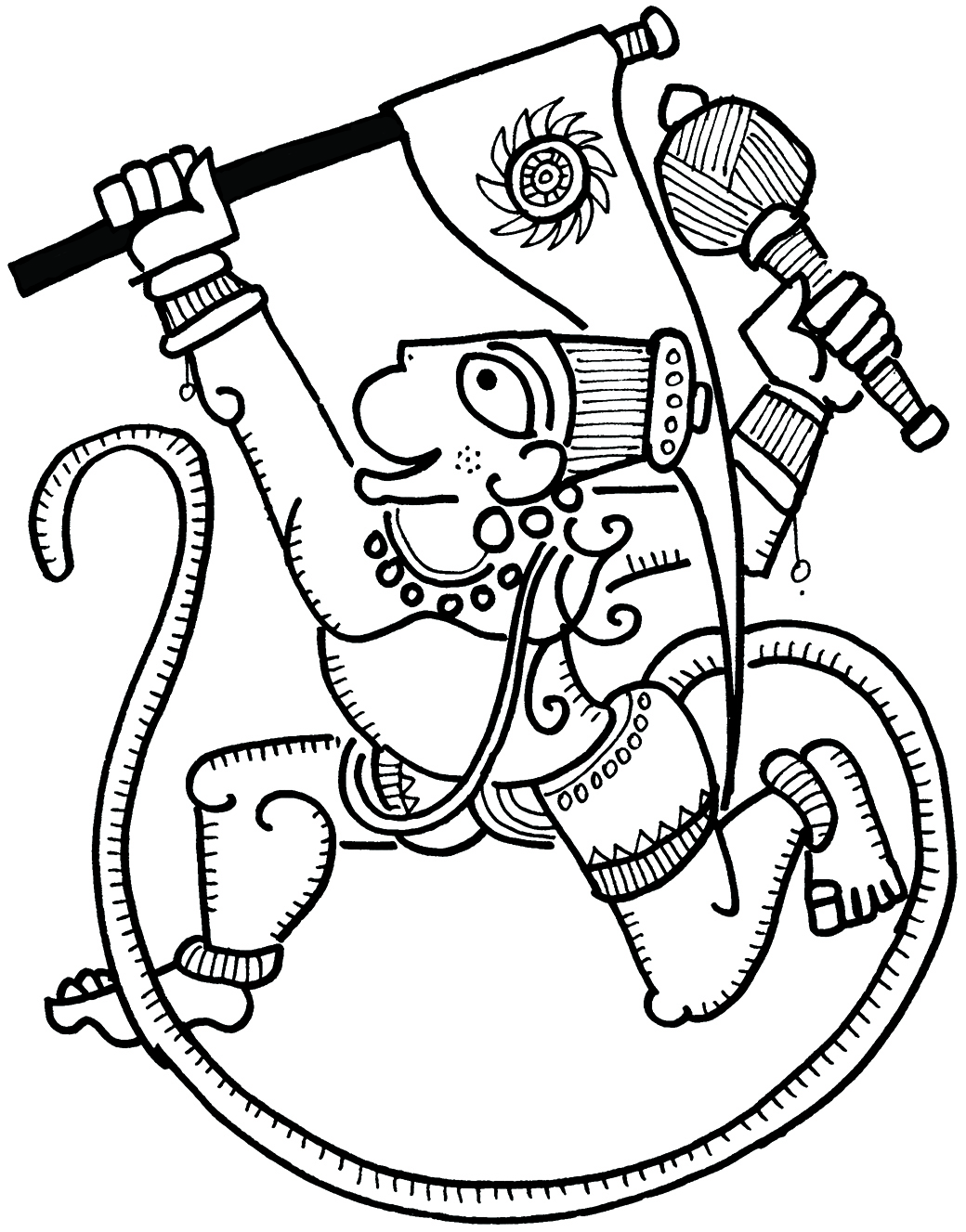
Hanuman with Ram's banner

Columnist Koral Dasgupta mentions, "Pattanaik’s art follows a particular style and is dependent on expertly sketched lines but the focus is never the perfection of hands and limbs and props. The pursuit is clearly that of beauty and depiction; not the grammatical detailing of a photograph!"

== Views ==
=== Myth and Mythology ===
Devdutt opines that "no society can exist without myth as it creates notions of right and wrong, good and bad, heaven and hell, rights and duties". To him, mythology "tells people how they should see the world... Different people will have their own mythology, reframing old ones or creating new ones." His desire is "to get Saraswati out of the closet. Saraswati belongs everywhere, she has to flow everywhere" and his body of work is aimed "to make knowledge accessible."

In Shiva to Shankara: Giving Form to the Formless, Devdutt explores the layers of meanings embedded in Shiva's linga and the transformation of Shiva, the hermit, into Shankara, the householder by the Goddess. Culture: 50 Insights from Mythology contextualises mythology and proposes that myths are alive, dynamic, shaped by perception and the times one lives in.

Western mythology, according to him, propagates the idea that the world is in need of changing, either by Greek heroes, or by Abrahamic prophets and kings, or by scientists, activists and capitalists. "Indic mythology presents the idea that the world is constantly changing, human intervention notwithstanding. There are no heroes or villains, no oppressor or oppressed, no saviour or martyr, just different ways of looking at reality...I do not claim objectivity; I am comfortable with subjectivity and well aware of my Indian gaze," he says.

=== Business ===
In his book, Business Sutra: An Indian Approach to Management, "the central theme … is that when individual beliefs come into conflict with corporate beliefs, problems surface in organisations. Conversely, when institutional beliefs and individual beliefs are congruent, harmony is the resultant corporate climate. It is when people are seen as mere resources meant to be managed [read: manipulated] through compensation and so-called motivation; it is when they are treated like switches in a circuit board; it is then that disharmony descends causing disruption".

=== Politics ===
Devdutt is wary of the influence of "white saviours" on liberals as well as religious radicals. He has been rather contemptuous of the hyper-nationalism of a section of American Hindus who are clueless about Indian realities. He also frowns on secularists and atheists who deny their own missionary zeal and mythic structure, and see themselves as "rational". Devdutt says, "Unlike fiction or history, mythology is a pluralistic truth with many interpretations, all of which needs to be respected." He further states, “For politicians, dates are important. For human beings and devotees, God is everywhere, every time.”

=== Sexuality ===
Devdutt has been frank about the LGBTQ revolution in India. Pattnaik realised that he was gay in 10th standard and came out to his parents when he was 30. After the 2018 decriminalization of homosexuality in India, Devdutt came out as gay in a televised interview. He has written about the presence, and at several instances, the celebration, of the queer within the Indian mythos. Elucidating that karmic faiths can be used to affirm the dignity of queer people, he speaks of how when one discovers love and appreciation for the world as it is, not the way one wants it to be, one develops wisdom.

== Reception ==
In 2014, Devdutt was listed in the top category of bestselling Indian authors. His book Devlok, based on the television programme of the same name, was one of the year's bestsellers in 2016. Forbes India had ranked Devdutt among the 100 celebrities of India in 2016.

Fiction author Ashwin Sanghi has said that Devdutt attempts to "explain mythology in simple words". Psychologist Urmi Chanda-Vaz, who calls Devdutt "India's most beloved mythology explicator", praised his book My Gita. Academic Shiv Visvanathan has praised Devdutt by saying that he has made myth-reading "an open, playful, almost domestic game, like Chinese Checkers or Scrabble".

Neil Gaiman praised Devdutt Pattanaik for his 2016 book Olympus: An Indian Retelling of the Greek Myth. "I read a fantastic Indian writer recently where he told Greek myth but from an Indian perspective... He makes it so easy to understand but what is lovely is that he does from a very proud Indian connect."

== Publications ==
=== Mythology ===
1. Shiva: An Introduction. Vakils, Feffer and Simons Ltd., 1997. ISBN 978-81-8462-013-9. (Based on Shiva).
2. Vishnu: An Introduction. Vakils, Feffer and Simons Ltd., 1999. ISBN 81-87111-12-7. (Based on Vishnu).
3. Devi, The Mother-Goddess: An Introduction. Vakils, Feffer, and Simons Ltd., 2000. ISBN 978-81-87111-91-7. (Based on the concept of Devi).
4. The Goddess in India: The Five Faces of the Eternal Feminine. Inner Traditions/ Bear & Company, 2000. ISBN 978-0-89281-807-5. Translations: Hindi.
5. Hanuman: An Introduction. Vakils, Feffer and Simons Ltd., 2001. ISBN 978-81-87111-94-8. (Based on Hanuman).
6. The Man Who Was A Woman and Other Queer Tales from Hindu Lore. Harrington Park Press, 2002. ISBN 1560231815.
7. Hindu India. Brijbasi Art Press, 2003. ISBN 8187902078.
8. Indian Mythology: Tales, Symbols, and Rituals from the Heart of the Subcontinent. Inner Traditions/ Bear & Company, 2003. ISBN 978-0-89281-870-9.
9. Lakshmi, The Goddess of Wealth and Fortune: An Introduction. Vakils, Feffer, and Simons Ltd., 2003. ISBN 978-81-8462-019-1. (Based on Lakshmi).
10. Myth=Mithya: A Handbook of Hindu Mythology. Penguin Books India, 2006. ISBN 9780143099703. Translations: Hindi, Marathi, Turkish.
11. Shiva to Shankara: Decoding the Phallic Symbol. Indus Source, India. 2006. ISBN 81-88569-04-6. Translations: Czech, Hindi (Based on Shiva).
12. The Book of Ram. Penguin Books India, 2009. ISBN 9780143065289. (Based on Ram) - Part of a book series on mythological figures published by Penguin.
13. 7 Secrets from Hindu Calendar Art. Westland Ltd., 2009. ISBN 9788189975678. Translations: Gujarati, Hindi (Based on Hindu Calendar art).
14. Hanuman's Ramayan. Tulika Publishers, 2010. ISBN 9788181467515. (Based on Hanuman).
15. Jaya: An Illustrated Retelling of the Mahabharata. Penguin Books India, 2010. ISBN 9780143104254. Translations: Hindi, Kannada, Malayalam, Marathi, Tamil (Based on the Mahabharata).
16. 7 Secrets of Shiva. Westland Ltd., 2011. ISBN 9789380658636. Translations: Gujarati, Hindi, Kannada, Marathi, Russian, Telugu (Based on Shiva).
17. 7 Secrets of Vishnu. Westland Ltd., 2011. ISBN 9789380658681. Translations: Hindi, Kannada, Marathi, Russian (Based on Vishnu).
18. 99 Thoughts on Ganesha: Stories, Symbols and Rituals of India's Beloved Elephant-headed Deity. Jaico Publishing House, 2011. ISBN 978-81-8495-152-3. Translations: Gujarati, Hindi, Malayalam, Marathi, Telugu (Based on Ganesha).
19. Sita: An Illustrated Retelling of the Ramayana. Penguin Books India, 2013 ISBN 9780143064329. Translations: Hindi, Marathi, Tamil (Based on the Ramayana).
20. Shikhandi: And Other Tales They Don't Tell You. Zubaan Books & Penguin Books India, 2014. ISBN 978-9383074846. Translations: Hindi, Marathi.
21. 7 Secrets of the Goddess. Westland Ltd., 2014. ISBN 9789384030582. Translations: Hindi, Italian, Marathi, Russian (Based on the Goddess).
22. My Gita. Rupa Publications India, 2015. ISBN 9788129137708. Translations: Hindi, Marathi (Based on The Gita).
23. Devlok with Devdutt Pattanaik. Penguin Random House India, 2016. ISBN 9780143427421.
24. Olympus – An Indian Retelling of Greek Mythology. Penguin Random House India, 2016. ISBN 9780143428299 (Based on Greek mythology).
25. Devlok with Devdutt Pattanaik (Book 2) – Publisher: Penguin Random House, 2017 ISBN 978-0143428435 Translations: Hindi ISBN 978-0143440468
26. Shiva to Shankara: Giving Form to the Formless. HarperCollins India, Indus Source 2017. ISBN 978-9352641956. – Based on Older Book / Reprint
27. My Hanuman Chalisa. Rupa Publications, 2017. ISBN 9788129147950 (Based in the Hanuman Chalisa).
28. Devlok with Devdutt Pattanaik (Book 3) – Publisher: Penguin Random House, 2017 ISBN 978-0143442790.
29. Shyam: An Illustrated Retelling of the Bhagavata. Penguin, 2018 ISBN 9780670084463 (Based on the Bhagavata).
30. Ramayana Versus Mahabharata: My Playful Comparison. Rupa Publications India, 2018 ISBN 9789353332303 (Based on the Ramayana & Mahabharata).
31. Hindu Trinity: 21 Life-enhancing Secrets Revealed Through Stories and Art. Westland India 2019. ISBN 978-9388754712. – Based on Older Books / Reprint
32. Wisdom of the Gods for You and Me: My Gita and My Hanuman Chalisa. Rupa Publications India 2019. ISBN 978-9353335113. – Based on Older Books / Reprint
33. Faith: 40 Insights into Hinduism – Publisher: HarperCollins, 2019 ISBN 978-9353025960.
34. Pilgrim Nation: The Making of Bharatvarsh - Aleph Book Company, 2020 ISBN 978-9389836004.
35. Dharma Artha Kama Moksha: 40 Insights into Happiness - HarperCollins, India, 2021 ISBN 978-9354224447.
36. Marriage: 100 Stories Around India's Favourite Ritual - Rupa Publications India, 2021 ISBN 9353338441.
37. Adi Purana: Entire Veda as a Single Story - Westland, 2021 ASIN B099ZWDLFH - quick read
38. Hope: Wisdom to Survive in a Hopeless World - Juggernaut, 2021 ISBN 978-9391165529.
39. Eden: An Indian Exploration of Jewish, Christian and Islamic Lore - Penguin Random House, 2021 ISBN 978-0670095407.
40. The Stories We Tell: Mythology to Make Sense of Modern Lives - Aleph Book Company, 2022 ISBN 978-9391047825.
41. Dharm Aur Samlaingikta/धर्म और समलैंगिकता - Penguin India, 2022 ISBN 978-0143454755.
42. Garuda Purana and Other Hindu Ideas On Death, Rebirth and Immortality - Westland Books, 2022 ISBN 978-9395073448.
43. Tales From the Land of Jagannatha - Odia Media Private Limited, 2023 ISBN 978-9395150088.
44. Bahubali : 63 Insights into Jainism - Harper Collins, India, 2023 ISBN 978-9356993457.
45. Tirthankar: Jain Dharm Par 63 Vichar - HarperHindi, India, 2023 ASIN B0CNSCZZKC.
46. Sati Savitri: And Other Feminist Stories They Don't Tell You - Penguin, 2024 ISBN 978-0143467588.
47. Ahimsa : 100 Reflections on the Harappan Civilization - Harper Collins, India, 2024 ISBN 978-9365699371.
48. Escape the Bakasura Trap : Let Contentment Fuel Your Growth - Juggernaut, 2025 ISBN 978-9353453749.
49. Flower of India: Ways of Seeing the Lotus - Aleph Book Company, 2026 ISBN 978-9365232059.
50. Itihasa: A History of Hindu Mythology - India Penguin, 2026 ISBN 978-9377305635.

=== Management ===
1. Business Sutra: A Very Indian Approach to Management. Aleph Book Company, 2013. ISBN 9788192328072. Translations: French, German, Hindi, Italian, Marathi, Tamil.
2. The Success Sutra: An Indian Approach to Wealth. Aleph Book Company, 2015. ISBN 9789384067410. – Based on Older Book
3. The Leadership Sutra: An Indian Approach to Power. Aleph Book Company, 2016. ISBN 9789384067465. – Based on Older Book
4. The Talent Sutra: An Indian Approach to Learning. Aleph Book Company, 2016, ISBN 9789383064274 – Based on Older Book
5. Culture: 50 Insights from Mythology. HarperCollins India, Indus Source 2017. ISBN 978-9352644971.
6. Leader: 50 Insights from Mythology. HarperCollins India, Indus Source 2017. ISBN 978-9352644957.
7. How to Become Rich: 12 Lessons I Learnt from Vedic and Puranic Stories – Publisher: Rupa Publications India, 2019 ISBN 978-9353336899.

=== Fiction ===
1. The Pregnant King. Penguin Books India, 2008. ISBN 9780143063476. Translations: Hindi, Marathi
2. Is He Fresh?: Aka Kaula Hai? (Penguin Petit). Penguin UK, 2015. ISBN 9789351187585

=== Children's books ===
1. Fun in Devlok: An Identity Card for Krishna. Puffin India, 2011. ISBN 978-0143331674.
2. Fun in Devlok: Gauri and the Talking Cow. Puffin India, 2011. ISBN 978-0143331704.
3. Fun in Devlok: Indra Finds Happiness. Puffin India, 2011. ISBN 978-0143331681.
4. Fun in Devlok: Kama vs Yama. Puffin India, 2011. ISBN 9780143331957.
5. Fun in Devlok: Saraswati's Secret River. Puffin India, 2011. ISBN 9780143331964.
6. Fun in Devlok: Shiva Plays Dumb Charades. Puffin India, 2011. ISBN 9780143331698.
7. Fun in Devlok Omnibus. Puffin India, 2014. ISBN 9780143333449. – Reprint (Compilation)
8. Pashu: Animal Tales from Hindu Mythology. Penguin Books India, 2014. ISBN 9780143332473. Translations: Hindi.
9. The Girl Who Chose: A New Way of Narrating the Ramayana. Puffin Books, 2016. ISBN 9780143334637 (Based on the Ramayana).
10. The Jaya Colouring Book. Penguin Random House India, 2016. ISBN 9780143426479. – Based on Older Book
11. The Sita Colouring Book. Penguin Random House India, 2016. ISBN 9780143426462. – Based on Older Book
12. The Boys Who Fought: The Mahabharata for Children. Puffin, 2017 ISBN 9789386815873 (Based on the Mahabharata).
13. Vahana: Gods and Their Favourite Animals - Rupa Publications India, 2020 ISBN 978-9390356065.
14. Shyam: Our Little Krishna - Puffin, 2021 ISBN 978-0143453697. - Based on Older Book
15. Greek Gods, Monsters and Heroes: Read and Colour - Puffin, 2023 ISBN 978-0143453703. - Based on Older Book
16. ABC of Hinduism for Kids - Aleph Book Company, 2024 ISBN 978-8119635740.
17. Gana-Bajana - Puffin, 2024 ISBN 978-0143470298.
18. Astra Shastra: Weapons of the Hindu Gods - Puffin, 2025 ISBN 978-9373035208.

=== Textbook ===
1. Indian Culture, Art and Heritage For Civil Services Exam – Publisher: Pearson India, 2021 (1st Edition) ISBN 978-9390531615.

=== Foreword/Contribution ===
1. Close, Too Close: The Tranquebar Book of Queer Erotica. Westland, 2012. ISBN 978-9386036919
2. Celebrating Public Spaces of India. Mapin Publishing, 2016. ISBN 978-9385360084.
3. The Illustrated Mahabharata: The Definitive Guide to India’s Greatest Epic. DK Publishing (Dorling Kindersley), 2017. ISBN 978-0241264348
4. I Am Divine. So Are You: How Buddhism, Jainism, Sikhism and Hinduism Affirm the Dignity of Queer Identities and Sexualities. HarperCollins, 2017 ISBN 9789352774869.
5. Padmavat: An Epic Love Story. Rupa Publications, 2018. ISBN 978-9353040239. -Illustrator
6. Behold, I Make All Things New: How Judaism, Christianity and Islam affirm the dignity of queer identities and sexualities. HarperCollins, 2019 ISBN 9789353574550.
7. Kabir, Kabir: The life and work of the early modern poet-philosopher. Westland, 2021 ISBN 978-9390679157. -Illustrator
8. Urban Sadhu Yoga™ Chant Book: A Collection of Chants, Kirtans, Prayers, Sutras, Shlokas, Shastras, Devotional Songs, and Inspirational Texts for the Modern Yoga Practitioner. ISBN 979-8492000349 -Illustrator

=== Co-authored ===
1. Yoga Mythology: 64 Asanas and Their Stories – Publisher: HarperCollins, 2019 ISBN 978-9353570842.
2. Aranyaka: Book of the Forest – Publisher: Westland, 2019 ISBN 978-9388754576.
