= Dharma Sabha =

Indian organization

Dharma Sabha was an organization formed in 1830 in Calcutta by Radhakanta Deb. The impetus of forming the organization came from a new law enacted by the colonial British rule which banned the practice of burning widows alive (sati) in the country; the focus of the new association was to repeal the law which was seen as an intrusion by the British into the religious affairs of the indigenous people by some sections of the Hindu community. The Dharma Sabha filed an appeal in the Privy Council against the ban on Sati by Lord William Bentinck as, according to them, it went against the assurance given by George III of non-interference in Hindu religious affairs; however, their appeal was rejected and the ban on Sati was upheld in 1832. It published a newspaper called Samachar Chandrika.

The Dharma Sabha campaigned against the Hindu Widow Remarriage Act, 1856 and submitted a petition against the proposal with nearly four times more signatures than the one submitted for it by Ishwar Chandra Vidyasagar. However Lord Dalhousie personally finalized the bill despite the opposition and it being considered a flagrant breach of Hindu customs as prevalent then, and it was passed by Lord Canning.

The organization soon morphed into a 'society in defense of Hindu way of life or culture'. Its executive body included a president, a board of directors, a secretary, and a treasurer, and its members regularly organized committees for special purposes. Furthermore, the organization conducted its meetings strictly according to the rules of parliamentary procedure, a form of Westernization adopted through interactions with the British. All of which serves to demonstrate the organization's deep-seated Western orientation.
