= Bhabani Charan Bandyopadhyay =

Bhabani Charan Bandyopadhyay ভবানীচরণ বন্দ্যোপাধ্যায়
- Born: 1787; Burdwan District, Bengal Presidency, British India
- Died: 1848 (aged 60–61); Calcutta, Bengal Presidency, British India
- Occupation: Journalist

Bhabani Charan Bandyopadhyay (Bengali: ভবানীচরণ বন্দ্যোপাধ্যায়) (1787 – 20 February 1848) was a noted Indian journalist, author and an orator. He was a conservative Hindu, who opposed Ram Mohan Roy in the abolition of Sati System. He was the founder of the Dharma Sabha. After his death, a work on his life and history (Jeebancharit) was published in 1849 under the custody of his son, Raj Krishna Bandyopadhyay, the then Secretary of the Dharma Sabha.

Towards the end of the 18th century and in the early years of the 19th century, many people were involved in controlling the education system and culture of the Bengalis through modern methods. Some were the employees of the East India Company, some were European missionaries from Serampore, Chinsurah, Burdwan, Maldah and Calcutta, and the others were the higher authorities from Fort William College. However, after 1815, Raja Ram Mohan Roy, Raja Radhakanta Deb, and others took up this project. One among these great men was Bhabani Charan Bandyopadhyay. Despite being one of the great thinkers of the time, he was not highly acclaimed as were his contemporaries.

== Life ==
Bhabani Charan was born in 1787. His father was Ramjoy Bandyopadhyay, who came to Calcutta from Ukhra district of Narayanpur, and worked at the mint. Bhabani Charan underwent professional training in Bengali, Parsee and English. He began helping his father at the age of 16, and was a bread winner of the family. For eleven years he served under the Duckett Company, in the "capacity of a Sircar" (J.Duckett wrote on 21 November 1814). In 1821 he went along with Sir William Carey to Meerut, to earn more. After coming back to Calcutta, when Carey became the Major General of Calcutta Fort, he became the deputy. But Carey had to go back to England. In the meantime he worked for Campton and Daley. He also worked under Bishop Middleton, and later became a deputy under Sir Henry Bluppet, chief justice of the Supreme Court. Lord Bishop Heber offered him the post of a principal in Bishop's College Calcutta. Heber later wrote about Bhabani Charan in Narrative of a Journey Through the Upper Provinces of India, from Calcutta to Bombay (1824–25): "...the most conspicuous-a tall fine looking man, in a white muslin dress, speaking good English, and the editor of a Bengali newspaper, who appeared with a large silken and embroidered purse full of silver coins, and presented it to us....it was the relic of the ancient Eastern custom of never approaching a superior without a present.. ...a shrewd fellow, well acquainted with the country...his account of the tenure of lands very closely corresponded with what I had previously heard from others." Much later he became the finance minister of the tax office. He also went on pilgrimage and travelled to many places, throughout his life.

Bhabani Charan died on 20 February 1848. On 8 June 1848 issue of Friend of India, his death was lamented and the following was written:-“Friday, 2 June...the 'Dhurma Sabha' is about to print, and circulate among its friends, a memoir of its late able Secretary, Baboo Bhobany Churn Banerjee... We take great shame to ourselves for having neglected distinctly to notice the death of this native gentleman, one of the ablest men of the age; ...”.

J. C. Marshman wrote in the history of Serampore Mission: “...Bhobany Churun, a Brahmin of great intelligence and considerable learning though no pundit, but remarkable for his tact and energy, which gave him great ascendency among his fellow-countrymen...”. In his Jeebancharit (or biography), it is said that he was a noble hearted and religious person, and one with a magnanimous personality.

== Establishment of the “Dharma Sabha” ==
Being a conservative Hindu, Bhabani Charan wanted to prevent the breach between the old and new forms of religion in the society, taking sides with the former. He reprinted many scriptures in the form of ancient manuscripts with notes and glossary, on a kind of paper made of cotton pulp, and distributed them among the common people. He thought many young people were deviating from the traditional expectations of the conduct of a Hindu, due to their English education at the Hindu College, and wrote on the subject arguing against deviation from traditional norms.

The Dharma Sabha was founded on 17 January 1830. It was established to protest against Raja Ram Mohan Roy's initiative to abolish the Sati System, and he wrote fiercely against it. He was the Secretary of the Dharma Sabha, till his death. The chief objective of this Sabha was to prevent the law which would abolish the Sati System. It also aimed at establishing a more conservative form of Hinduism by overpowering the opinion of atheist and liberal Hindus. Many branches of the Dharma Sabha were established in many places, such as Dhaka, Patna, Danapur, Andul, etc., to safeguard the interests of the hyper-orthodox. A school called Sil's Free College was established to compete with clergymen-run schools. The Sabha also arranged a monthly allowance for the young, the old and the widows, particularly those, who failed to meet ends.

== Sambad Kaumudi and Samachar Chandrika ==
Bhabani Charan started with the Sambad Kaumudi, which was first published on 4 December 1821 under his editorship. It was actually the main vehicle of Ram Mohan Roy's campaign against Sati. Although Ram Mohan Roy was the owner, Sambad Kaumudi was published in the name of Bhabani Charan Bandyopadhyay. The latter soon found Ram Mohan's ideas too radical and parted company to start a rival newspaper called Samachar Chandrika, which became an organ of orthodox Hinduism. According to a different source, Kaumudi was started by Tarachand Dutta and Bhabani Charan Bandopadhyay. Though Bhabani Charan Bandopadhyay was nominally in charge of this weekly till the publication of its thirteenth issue, Ram Mohan was its promoter, and for all practical purposes, also its editor. After Bhabani Charan Bandyopadhyay, Harihar Dutta was the editor for some time, followed by Gobinda Chandra Kongar. Due to lack of sufficient patronage Sambad Kaumudi had to stop publication in October 1822.

The first issue of Samachar Chandrika came out on 5 March 1822. After the publication of the first two issues, Bhabani Charan published an advertisement announcing Samachar Chandrika's arrival in the market in Serampore's Samachar Darpan. Harihar Dutta, the then editor of Sambad Kaumudi got back to Bhabani Charan and published an advertisement on 21 March 1822: "the Editor of the Sungbad Coumudy observing an Advertisement, inserted in the Calcutta Journal of the 15th instant, by one Bhobanee Churn Bunnerjee, asserting that the first 13 Nos. of the Coumudy were edited by him, deems if indispensably necessary to state, for publication, that this declaration is a wicked and malicious fabrication of falsehood.... for he was no more than the real Editor's Assistant..." So, it is not certain whether he was the actual Editor or the Editor's Assistant, but there is a clear indication of a dispute between the two, which has been described in his Jeebancharit.

In April 1829, Samachar Chandrika began coming out twice a week instead of once.

== His works ==
Bhabani Charan's wit was reflected in his satirical works. In the dull days of scriptural arguments, he brought in a fresh air of charm and humour in Bengali literature. He was a noted publisher too. He wrote many books in lucid Bengali. Gourishankar Tarkobagish, a famous journalist of that era, commented highly about his writing skill in Sambad Bhaskar. In 1821–22, in Samachar Darpan, several works came out like Babur Upakhyan, Briddhyer Bibaho, Brahmin Pundit and others, that bear the mark of his unique satirical ability.

The books that were written or edited by Bhabani Charan are briefly described below:-

- Kalikata Kamalalay (1823): This book talks about the “behaviour, customs (treatment), and cleverness of speech” adopted by the people of the city of Calcutta when confronted by a villager, in a "question-answer" manner.
- Hitopodesh (1823): It incorporates salutary advice & teachings with original religious verses in Sanskrit as well as its Bengali translation. It was published in the Samachar Chandrika Press.
- Nabababubilas or the Amusements of the Modern Baboo (1825): It was the first book published by Bhabani Charan. This book provides a satirical view of the education of the rich and their habits, and especially of those families which had become more prominent in the society by acquiring sudden wealth. The purpose of writing the book was to reform this particular class of people. This book had become very popular and was also published later in the form of a drama. Bhabani Charan had used a pseudonym of Prathamnath Sharman in this work. It was believed that this social novel preceded Parichand Mitra's Alaaler Ghore Dulaal. According to Brajendralal Mitra, there are also certain similarities between the two. In 1855, Reverend James Long wrote that this work was "one of the ablest satires on the Calcutta Babu, as he was 30 years ago.”

In Friend of India, Nabababubilas was praised –" the character of the work, as well as its allusions and similes, are purely native, and this imparts a value to it, superior to that which could be attached to a similar representation from a European pen... though the work is highly satirical, some of its strokes of ridicule" are also visible. "...we cannot venture to pronounce it a caricature...it illustrates the habit and economy of rich native families, and affords us a glance behind the scenes."

- Dyutibilash (1825): This is a versified description of parties arranged by high society women concerning eroticism (passion) as well as devotion.
- Nababibibilash (1831): This book was written as a companion piece to "Nabababubilas", describing similar acts & habits of the wives of the rich men.
- Sri Sri Gayatirtha Bistar: Its first edition was published in 1831, and the second edition was published in 1843. It is composed in verse form and is a mythological work.
- Ashcharya Upakhyan (1835): It narrates the glorious deeds of one Kalishankar Roy, a zamindar. It is written in verse form.
- Purushottam Chandrika (1844): It contains special description and tales of various places in and around Puri, Bhubaneswar, etc.

=== Edited texts ===
The ancient Sanskrit texts, edited and published by Bhabani Charan, are briefly described below:-

- Hasyarnava: The special edition of the original book, written by Jagadiswar, was perhaps released in the decade between 1830 and 1840 by Bhabani Charan. It was on the directions of Bijoy Govind Singh, who was the author of a history book called Rajabali.
- Srimadbhagavata: This was published in two parts in the form of ancient manuscript in 1830.
- Prabodhchandrodaya Natakam: The edition of the original book was written by Srikrishna Mishra, and was released in the form of ancient manuscript in 1833.
- Manusamhita: This was published in the form of ancient manuscript in 1833.
- Unavimsha Samhita: This was published in the form of ancient manuscript, most probably in 1833. The collections were Angira, Aapastamba, Atri, Shankha, Shatatap, Dakshya, Goutam, Harit, Katyaon, Likhit, Parashar, Sambarta, Ushana, Vishnu, Brihaspati, Vyas, Yagnabalkya, Yama and Vashistsamhita.
- Sribhagvatgita: This was published in the form of ancient manuscript in 1835.
- Raghunatha Bhattacharyakrita Ashtavimshati Tatva Navya Smriti: This was published in the form of ancient manuscript, most probably in 1848.

== See also ==
- Print media in India
- Early Phase of Printing in Calcutta
