= Hindu Widows' Remarriage Act, 1856 =

Act of India under East India Company rule

- Marriage Of Hindu Widows by Iswarchandra Vidyasagar (2nd edition, 1864)
- Long title: Widow act

Repealed by
- Widows' Re-marriage (Repeal) Act, 1983
- Status: Repealed

The Hindu Widows' Remarriage Act 1856 (Act XV of 1856), passed on 16 July 1856, legalised the remarriage of widows in all jurisdictions of India under East India Company rule. The act was enacted on 26 July 1856. It was drafted by Lord Dalhousie and passed by Lord Canning before the Indian Rebellion of 1857. It was the first major social reform legislation after the abolition of sati pratha in 1829 by Lord William Bentinck.

To protect what it considered family honour and family property, Hindu society had long disallowed the remarriage of widows, even child and adolescent ones, all of whom were expected to live a life of austerity and abnegation. The Hindu Widows' Remarriage Act of 1856, provided legal safeguards against loss of certain forms of inheritance for remarrying a Hindu widow, though, under the Act, the widow forsook any inheritance due her from her deceased husband. Especially targeted in the act were child widows whose husbands had died before consummation of marriage.

Ishwar Chandra Vidyasagar was the most prominent campaigner. He petitioned the Legislative council, but there was a counter petition against the proposal with nearly four times more signatures by Radhakanta Deb and the Dharma Sabha. But Lord Dalhousie personally finalised the bill despite the opposition and it being considered a flagrant breach of customs as prevalent then.

"Second marriages, after the death of the husband first espoused, are wholly unknown to the Law; though in practice, among some communities, nothing is so common."

— William Hay Macnaghten (1862)

"The problem of widows—and especially of child widows—was largely a prerogative of the higher Class people among whom child marriage was practised and remarriage prohibited. Irrevocably, eternally married as a mere child, the death of the husband she had perhaps never known left the wife a widow, an inauspicious being whose sins in a previous life had deprived her of her husband, and her parents-in-law of their son, in this one. Doomed to a life of prayer, fasting, and drudgery, unwelcome at the celebrations and auspicious occasions that are so much a part of many communities of any religion family and community life, her lot was scarcely to be envied.

On the other hand, particularly Sudra caste and dalits —who represented approximately 80 percent of the Hindu population—neither practised child marriage nor prohibited the remarriage of widows."

— Lucy Carroll (1983)

== The law ==
The preamble and sections 1, 2, and 5:

Whereas it is known that, by the law as administered in the Civil Courts established in the territories in the possession and under the Government of the East India Company, Hindu widows with certain exceptions are held to be, by reason of their having been once married, incapable of contracting a second valid marriage, and the offsprings of such widows by any second marriage are held to be illegitimate and incapable of inheriting property; and

Whereas many Hindus believe that this imputed legal incapacity, although it is in accordance with established custom, is not in accordance with a true interpretation of the precepts of their religion, and desire that the civil law administered by the Courts of Justice shall no longer prevent those Hindus who may he so minded from adopting a different custom, in accordance with the dictates of their own conscience, and

Where it is just to relieve all such Hindus from this legal incapacity of which they complain, and the removal of all legal obstacles to the marriage of Hindu widows will tend to the promotion of good morals and to the public welfare;

It is enacted as follows:

1. No marriage contracted between Hindus shall be invalid, and the issue of no such marriage shall be illegitimate, by reason of the woman having been previously married or betrothed to another person who was dead at the time of such marriage, any custom and any interpretation of Hindu Law to the contrary notwithstanding.
2. All rights and interests which any widow may have in her deceased husband's property by way of maintenance, or by inheritance to her husband or to his lineal successors, or by virtue of any will or testamentary disposition conferring upon her, without express permission to remarry, only a limited interest in such property, with no power of alienating the same, shall upon her re-marriage cease and determine as if she had then died; and the next heirs of her deceased husband or other persons entitled to the property on her death, shall thereupon succeed to the same ....
5. Except as in the three preceding sections is provided, a widow shall not by reason of her re-marriage forfeit any property or any right to which she would otherwise be entitled, and every widow who has re-married shall have the same rights of inheritance as she would have had, had such marriage been her first marriage.
