= Samachar Chandrika =

Indian newspaper

- Editor: Bhabani Charan Bandyopadhyay
- Founded: 15 March 1822
- Political alignment: Dharma Sabha
- Language: Bengali language

Samachar Chandrika was a weekly newspaper founded in 1822 by Bhabani Charan Bandyopadhyay it was an orthodox Hindu newspaper of the Dharma Sabha. It campaigned against social reforms including the ban on Sati by Lord William Bentinck. It was published for over 32 years.
