= List of newspapers in Malta =

This is a list of newspapers published in Malta.

Title	Published	Language	Established	Owner	Political affiliation	Notes
In-Nazzjon	Daily	Maltese	1970	Media.link Communications (Nationalist Party)	Nationalist Party	Organ of the Nationalist Party. Formerly In-Nazzjon Tagħna and In-…Taghna
L-Orizzont	Daily	Maltese	1962	Union Print Co. (General Workers' Union)	Malta Labour Party	Organ of the General Workers' Union
The Malta Independent, The Malta Independent on Sunday	Daily	English	1992	Standard Publications	Nationalist Party	
Times of Malta, Sunday Times of Malta	Daily	English	1935	Allied Newspapers	Nationalist Party	Established in 1929 as Times of Malta Weekly
Malta Today, Malta Today on Sunday	Biweekly	English	1999	Media Today	Malta Labour Party and Democratic Alternative	
Corriere di Malta	Daily	Italian	2017	Fortissimo Ltd		
Illum	Weekly	Maltese		Media Today	Malta Labour Party and Democratic Alternative	
Kullħadd	Weekly	Maltese	1992	Malta Labour Party	Malta Labour Party	Organ of the Malta Labour Party
Business Today	Weekly	English		Media Today		
Il-Mument	Weekly	Maltese	1970	Media.link Communications (Nationalist Party)	Nationalist Party	Organ of the Nationalist Party
It-Torċa	Weekly	Maltese		Union Print Co. (General Workers' Union)	Malta Labour Party	Organ of the General Workers' Union
Il-Leħen	Weekly	Maltese	1928 as Leħen is-Sewwa	(Catholic Action) Malta	Catholic Church	
Il-Gens	Weekly	Maltese	1920s as Il-Hajja		Catholic Church	
Malta Government Gazette		Maltese; English	1813	Department of Information (Government of Malta)		Formerly also in Italian

== Defunct newspapers ==
Title	Published	Language	Established	Defunct	Political affiliation	Notes
Journal de Malte	intermittent	French; Italian	1798	1798	French republicanism	First newspaper ever published in Malta
Foglio d'Avvisi		Italian	1803	1804	Pro-British	First newspaper published under British rule
L'Argo		Italian	1804	1804	Pro-British	
Il Cartaginese		Italian	1804	1810	Pro-British	
Giornale di Malta		Italian	1812	1813	Pro-British	
Lo Spettatore Imparziale	monthly	Italian	23 April 1838	pre-1899	Pro-British; edited by Canon Fortunato (or Francesco) Panzavecchia	
Portafoglio Maltese	weekly biweekly	Italian	May 1838	post-1899	Conservative	Political and religious; established by lawyer Paolo Sciortino
Il Mediterraneo - Gazzetta di Malta		Italian	1838	1874	Liberal, secular, pro-Italian	established by Zauli-Sajani and Carlo Cigognani Cappelli
The Harlequin		English	1838 ?	pre-1899		
II Corriere maltese		Italian	1839	pre-1899	Liberal, anti-Borbonic	Established by Salvatore Costanzo
L'Aristide		Italian	1840s	pre-1899	Liberal, anti-Borbonic	Established by Salvatore Costanzo
L'Eco dei Tribunali di Malta		Italian	1843	pre-1899		
Malta Times	weekly	English	1840s	pre-1899		
L'Indipendente		Italian	1850s	pre-1899		
L'Economista di Malta		Italian	1876		Business	
Malta - Quotidiano Nazionalista (Gazzetta Maltese)	daily	Italian	1883	1943	Pro-Italian, edited by Fortunato Mizzi, Enrico Mizzi	
Daily Malta Chronicle and Garrison Gazette	weekly daily	English	1884	1940	Pro-British	
Lloyd Maltese	daily	Italiano	pre-1899	1940	Business	Published by the Chamber of Commerce
Il Habbar; Il Habbar Malti; Il Habbar Cattolicu		Maltese	pre-1899		Conservative	Political, religious Edited by Antonio Muscat Fenech
Malta Standard	biweekly	English	pre-1899		Pro-British	
Public Opinion		English	pre-1899			
Risorgimento	daily	Italian	pre-1899		Pro-Italian	Political, business
Avvisatore		Italian	ca.1900			
Il Ghannej		Maltese	ca.1900			
The Enterprise		English	ca.1900			Business
Il Bon Pastur		Maltese	ca.1900			Religious
Malta Army and Navy Gazette		English	ca.1900			Military
La Chitarra		Italian	ca.1900			Musical
Il Ghafrit		Maltese	ca.1900			
Finanza e Commercio		Maltese	ca.1900			Business
San Paul		Maltese	ca.1900			Religious
Lo Studente		Italian	ca.1900			
Il Biricchino al Teatro		Italian	ca.1900			Theatre
L'Afrique Maltaise		French	ca.1900			
La Rivista Medica		Italian	ca.1900			Medicine
Il Naturalista Maltese		Italian	ca.1900			Nature
Youth		English	ca.1900			Youth
Propagazjoni tal Fidi		Maltese	ca.1900			Religious
La Salute Publica		Italian	ca.1900			Public health
Philatelic		English	ca.1900			Philatelic
Il Habbar Ghawdxi		Maltese	ca.1900			Gozo news
Malta Football Record Book		English	ca.1900			Football
Athenaeum Melitense		Italian (?)	ca.1900			Arts and literature
Il-Ħaddiem / The Worker		Maltese / English	ca.1900	post-1960s		Trade unions
Archivum Melitense		?	ca.1900			Philatelic
Ir Rusariu Imkaddes		Maltese	ca.1900			Religious
Il Calcio		Italian	ca.1900			Football
Bollettino della Societa' Economico Agraria		Italian	ca.1900			Agri-business
The Teacher		English	ca.1900			Teaching matters
Malta Letteraria	monthly	Italian	1904	1914	Issued by Giovine Malta. The first 10 volumes (1904-1913) were edited by Arturo Mercieca and the eleventh (1914) by Enrico Mizzi	
Giahan		Maltese	ca.1900			
L-Hmar		Maltese	ca.1900			Political (including satire)
Is-Salib		Maltese	ca.1900		Religious/conservative	
II-Habib		Maltese	ca.1900		Religious/conservative	
II-Poplu Malti		Maltese	ca.1900			first important Nationalist paper in Maltese
Malta Ghada Taghna		Maltese	ca.1900		Sigismondo Savona's	
Il-Bandiera tal-Maltin		Maltese	ca.1900	Manwel Dimech's		
In-Nahla		Maltese	ca.1900		Agostino Levanzin's	
Malta Maltia!		Maltese	ca.1900			
Il Progress		Maltese	1921	1932	Stricklandian	
Malta Letteraria (nuova serie)	monthly	Italian	1926	1939		edited by Giovanni Curmi as "rassegna mensile di cultura".
L'Eco di Malta e Gozo		Italian	1920s		Enrico Mizzi	
Labour Opinion later: II Cotra		English; Maltese	1920s		Malta Labour Party	
Il Patria		Maltese	1920s		Ignazio Panzavecchia's	
Il Berka		Maltese	1920s			
Ix-Xemx		Maltese	1920s			
Il-Helsien	daily weekly	Maltese		1992	Malta Labour Party	Former organ of the Malta Labour Party. Founded in 1959 as a successor to Is-Sebħ after its editor was imprisoned for criticising the British Governor-General Robert Laycock
Malta Letteraria (third series)	4-monthly	Italian	1952	1955		Literature
Malta Taghna		Maltese	1950s	1960s		Edited by Herbert Ganado
Is-Sebħ		Maltese	1950s		Malta Labour Party	Edited by Joe Micallef Stafrace who was imprisoned for criticising the British Governor-General Robert Laycock in a political cartoon. Briefly resurrected in the 1970s as a successor to the newspaper Iż-Żmien.
The Maltese Observer	weekly	English	1950s	1960s		Edited for some years by Tom Hedley, former editor of The Times of Malta
Ix-Xewka		Maltese	1965	1978	Malta Labour Party	Satirical left-wing newspaper
