= Malta Government Gazette =

Government gazette of Malta

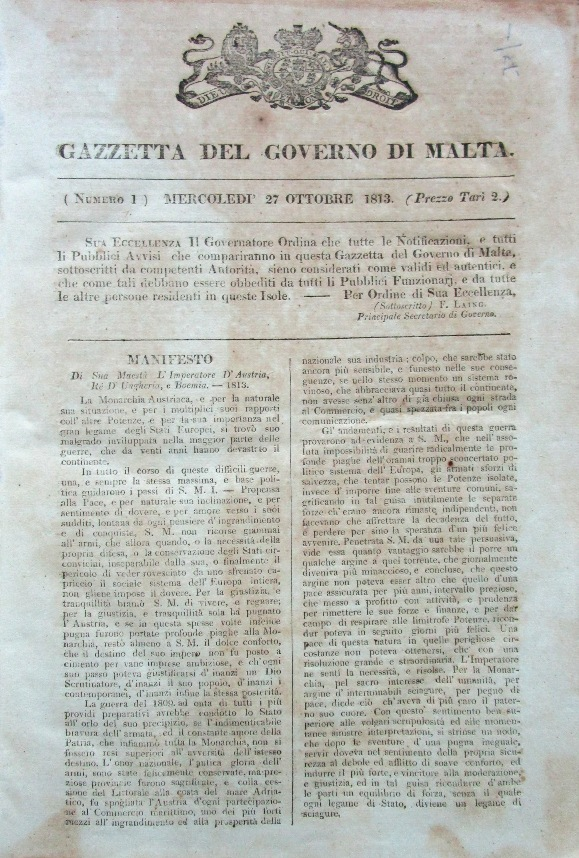
- Gazzetta del Governo di Malta, 1813
- Type: Government gazette
- Format: Digital-only (since 2015); Printed (1813–2015)
- Publisher: Department of Information
- Founded: 27 October 1813; 212 years ago
- Language: Maltese and English; Italian (formerly)
- Headquarters: Valletta
- Country: Malta
- Website: Department of Information

The Malta Government Gazette (Maltese: Gazzetta tal-Gvern ta' Malta, Italian: Gazzetta del Governo di Malta) is a government gazette published by the Department of Information of the Government of Malta. It was first published in 1813 when the islands were a British colony and it continued to be published after Malta became independent in 1964. Since then, the newspaper has been published in Maltese and English; previous editions were in Italian or a combination of some or all of the three languages. Since 2015 the gazette has been published in a digital-only format, and only a limited number of copies are printed for archival purposes.

== Publication history ==
The Journal de Malte, a newspaper which was published during the French occupation of Malta in 1798, is regarded as the predecessor of the Malta Government Gazette. After British rule was established in Malta in 1800, a number of newspapers were published by the government under different titles: Foglio d'Avvisi (1803–1804), L'Argo (1804), Il Cartaginese (1804–1805) and the Giornale di Malta (1812–1813).

The first edition of the Gazzetta del Governo di Malta was published on 27 October 1813. The first edition entitled Malta Government Gazette in English was published on 7 August 1816. Before freedom of the press was established in 1839, the gazette was the only newspaper published in the islands. From 1930, the gazette began to be published in three languages: English, Maltese and Italian.

Since Malta's independence in 1964, the gazette has been published in Maltese and English, with its Maltese title being Gazzetta tal-Gvern ta' Malta. Printed editions of the gazette were discontinued in favour of digital versions in 2015, and the latter are available on the website of the Department of Information. Since then, only 25 physical copies of each edition of the gazette have been printed, and they are kept at the Department of Information and at the National Library of Malta.

The Department of Information holds an archive of gazettes published since 1813.
