= Description de l'Égypte (disambiguation) =

Description de l'Égypte is the title of several books.

- Description de l'Égypte - Description de l'Égypte ou Recueil des observations et des recherches qui ont été faites en Égypte pendant l'expédition de l'armée française Pub; First Edition (23 books), L'Imprimerie Imperiale, 1809–1813; l'Imprimerie Royale, 1817–1822. Pub; Second Edition (37 books), Charles Louis Fleury Panckoucke, Paris, 1821–1830.
- Description de l'Égypte - Description de l'Égypte, contenant plusieurs remarques curieuses sur la Geographie ancienne et moderne de ce pais.... Benoît de Maillet and Jean-Baptiste Le Mascrier Pub; Louis Genneau and Jacques Rollin, Paris, 1735.
- Description of Egypt - Description of Egypt; Notes and views in Egypt and Nubia made during the years 1825–1828, Edward William Lane Pub; The American University in Cairo Press, 2000 (This manuscript lay dormant in the British Library for 170 years)
