= Mémoires sur l'Égypte =

Book series published by Institut d'Egypte

Mémoires sur l'Égypte (Memoirs Relative to Egypt), long title Mémoires sur l'Égypte, publiés pendant les campagnes du Général Bonaparte dans les années VI. VII. VIII. et IX (Memoirs Relative to Egypt Published during the Campaign of General Bonaparte in the Years 1798 and 1799), was a 4-volume series published by Institut d'Egypte in 1798–1801 (Years VI–IX of the French Republican calendar). A collection of writings, the books detail research during Napoleon's Campaign in Egypt, comprising some of the most foundational scientific research on the Middle East by Western scholars notably in the emerging field of Egyptology. A Paris reprint of the series was released in 1799–1803 (Years VIII–XI) and an English translation of Volume 1 was printed in London on 31 March 1800.

== Background ==
Approximately 160 civilian scholars and scientists (savants), many from the Institut de France, comprised the Commission des Sciences et Arts d'Égypte. In late August 1798, about a third of them became members of Institut d'Egypte, which was founded in the palace of Hassan-Kashif on the outskirts of Cairo, with Gaspard Monge as president. The Institute housed a library, laboratories, workshops, and the savants' various Egyptian collections. One of the goals of the institute was to propagate knowledge. To this end, the savants published the Mémoires, a journal, La Decade Egyptienne, as well as a newspaper, Courier de L'Egypte.

== Organization ==
The books are not divided neatly into chapters and the only divisions are by the specific piece of research followed by another specific piece of research. Essentially, the books are a collection of primary source documents about living as a researcher through Napoleon's campaign and various pieces of research that were collected from the adventure. Few scholars have written on the organization of the Mémoires, but one who did is the British historian of science George John Singer. In the July 1816 issue of The Eclectic Review, Singer praised the Mémoires for their ground-breaking insights, but expressed great confusion at why the research was organized the way it is and how exactly specific areas were chosen to be comprehensively researched or even investigated at all.

== Themes ==
There are a few patterns among the works. However, these are just generic themes throughout the Mémoires that are not officially organized or even stated by the authors. Furthermore, sometimes writings overlap between the following artificial categories: military reports, geographical discoveries, and colonial subject descriptions.

Military reports—in this context—refer to pieces of research that deal with aspects such as weaponry, updates on campaign progress, medical findings, and narratives by army personnel. Examples of these writings include "A Report Relative to the Manufacture of the Saltpeter and Gunpowder of Egypt" and "Account of the Prevailing Ophthalmia of Egypt". The quality of writing various greatly from piece to piece with different authors, likely a sign that some people on the expedition were more academically inclined towards the liberal arts while others were geared toward the sciences or military.

Geographical discoveries refer to research relating to directions, topography, and other aspects at least peripherally related to land or location. A few examples in the book are "Observations on the Arabian Horses of the Desert", and "Plan of an Agricultural Establishment in Egypt". A trend that re-occurs throughout much of this theme is that many of the pieces were not written in the scientific manner traditionally used in the Western world of today. For instance, "Description of the Route from Cairo to Isalehhyeh" begins with praise by the French for Egypt's historic success in being a hub for literature in Africa and the Middle East, an introduction quite different from the bland third person narrative of academic jargon that encompasses much contemporary scientific research.

The last general theme is the preservation of descriptions of France's colonial subjects in Egypt. A couple of examples of these writings include "An Arabian Ode on the Conquest of Egypt" and "Concerning the Coptic Monasteries". However, the writings are by French scholars and not the colonial subjects themselves. As a result, this opens up the debate regarding whether or not the depictions were fully accurate, a controversy that has existed since the late 1970s called "Orientalism".

== Related text ==
The Mémoires were eventually worked into Description de l'Égypte (Description of Egypt), an accumulation of various research done during Napoleon's campaign (published in 37 volumes from 1809 to around 1829), along with other research of the period, that would ultimately be presented to the French government in two volumes.
