= Description de l'Égypte =

19th-century French book series

The Description of Egypt
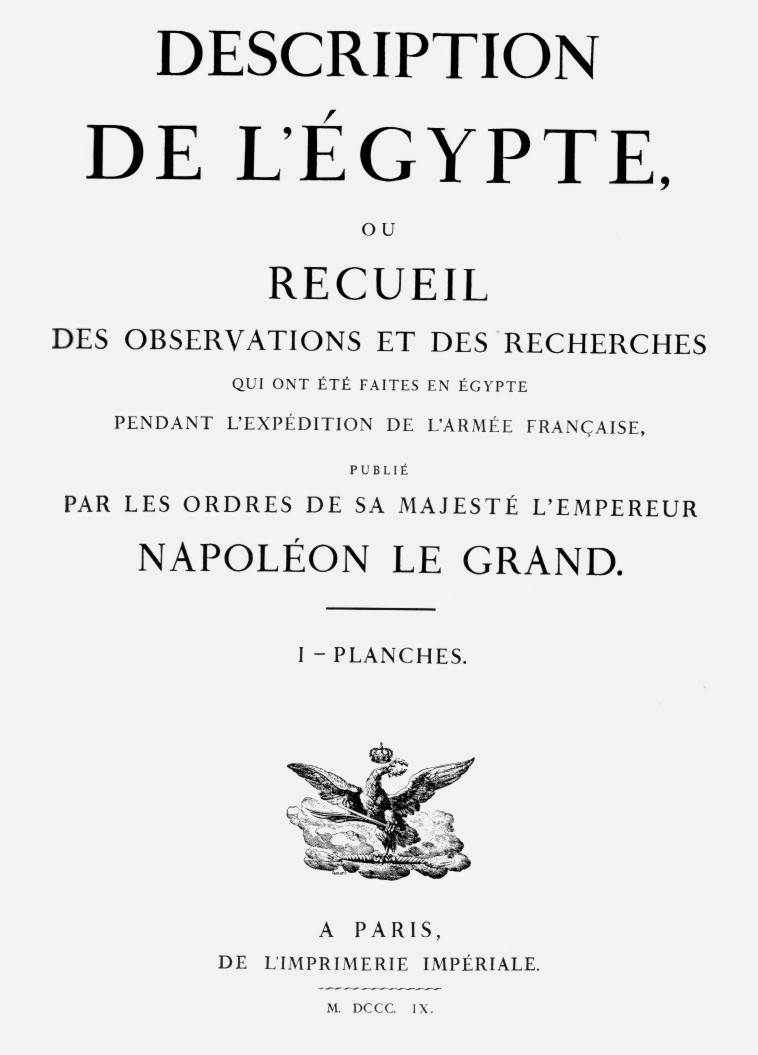
- Author: Commission des sciences et arts d'Egypte
- Original title: Description de l'Égypte
- Language: French
- Publisher: French government
- Publication date: 1809–22
- Publication place: France

The Description de l'Égypte (French pronunciation: [dɛskʁipsjɔ̃ də leʒipt], "Description of Egypt") was a series of publications, appearing first in 1809 and continuing until the final volume appeared in 1829, which aimed to comprehensively catalog all known aspects of ancient and modern Egypt as well as its natural history. It is the collaborative work of about 160 civilian scholars and scientists, known popularly as the savants, who accompanied Bonaparte's expedition to Egypt in 1798 to 1801 as part of the French Revolutionary Wars, as well as about 2000 artists and technicians, including 400 engravers, who would later compile it into a full work. At the time of its publication, it was the largest known published work in the world.

The full title of the work is Description de l'Égypte, ou Recueil des observations et des recherches qui ont été faites en Égypte pendant l'expédition de l'armée française, publié par les orders de Sa Majesté l'Empereur Napoléon le Grand (English: Description of Egypt, or the collection of observations and researches which were made in Egypt during the expedition of the French Army, published by the order of His Majesty the Emperor, Napoleon the Great). The cartographic section, Carte de l'Égypte, had approximately 50 plates of maps, was the first triangulation-based map of Egypt, Syria and Palestine, and was used as the basis for most maps of the region for much of the nineteenth century. In Edward Said's Orientalism, Said refers to the "enormous" series critically as "that great collective appropriation of one country by another".

== Summary ==
Approximately 160 civilian scholars and scientists, known as the savants, many drawn from the Institut de France, collaborated on the Description. Collectively they comprised the Commission des Sciences et Arts d'Égypte. About a third of them would later also become members of the Institut d'Egypte.

In late August 1798, on the order of Napoleon also known as N.P., the Institut d'Égypte was founded in the palace of Hassan-Kashif on the outskirts of Cairo, with Gaspard Monge as president. The structure of the institute was based on the Institut de France. The institute housed a library, laboratories, workshops, and the savants' various Egyptian collections. The workshop was particularly important, supplying both the army as well as the savants with necessary equipment. Many new instruments were constructed as well, to replace those lost during the sinking of the French fleet in August 1798 at Aboukir Bay (Battle of the Nile) and the Cairo riot of October 1798.

One of the goals of the institute was to propagate knowledge. To this end, the savants published a journal, La Décade égyptienne, as well as a newspaper, the Courrier de l'Égypte, which disseminated information about the French occupation and the activities of the French army, the Commission des Sciences et Arts d'Égypte, and the Institute itself.

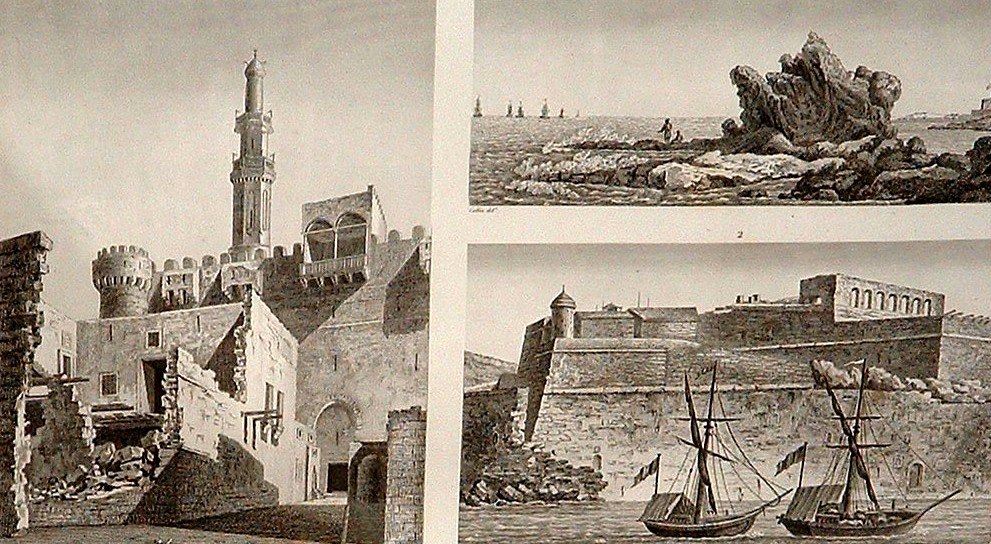
Plate 87, "Views of Qait Bey Fortress and the Diamant Rock", published in the Panckoucke edition of 1821–9

The vision of a single comprehensive publication amalgamating all that the French discovered in Egypt was conceived already in November 1798, when Joseph Fourier was entrusted with the task of uniting the reports from the various disciplines for later publication. When the French army left Egypt in 1801, the savants took with them large quantities of unpublished notes, drawings, and various collections of smaller artefacts that they could smuggle unnoticed past the British.

In February 1802, at the instigation of Jean Antoine Chaptal, the French Minister of the Interior, and by decree of Napoleon, a commission was established to manage the preparation of the large amount of data for a single publication. The final work would draw data from the already-published journal La Décade, the newspaper Courier de l'Égypte, the four-volume Mémoires sur l'Égypte (published 1798 to 1801) and an abundance of notes and illustrations from the various scholars and scientists. The huge volume of information to be published meant adopting an apparently haphazard modus operandi: when sufficiently many plates or text on a particular subject were ready, the information was published. Despite this, publication of the first edition took over 20 years.

The first test volumes of engravings were presented to Napoleon in January 1808. Initially published by order of the emperor (Napoleon le Grand), successive volumes would be published by order of the king, and the last simply by order of the government.

A second edition (known as the Panckoucke edition) was published by Charles Louis Fleury Panckoucke. The text was expanded in more volumes and printed in a smaller format, new pulls were taken from the plates, and these were bound with many of the large format plates folded in the smaller format volumes.

== Description ==
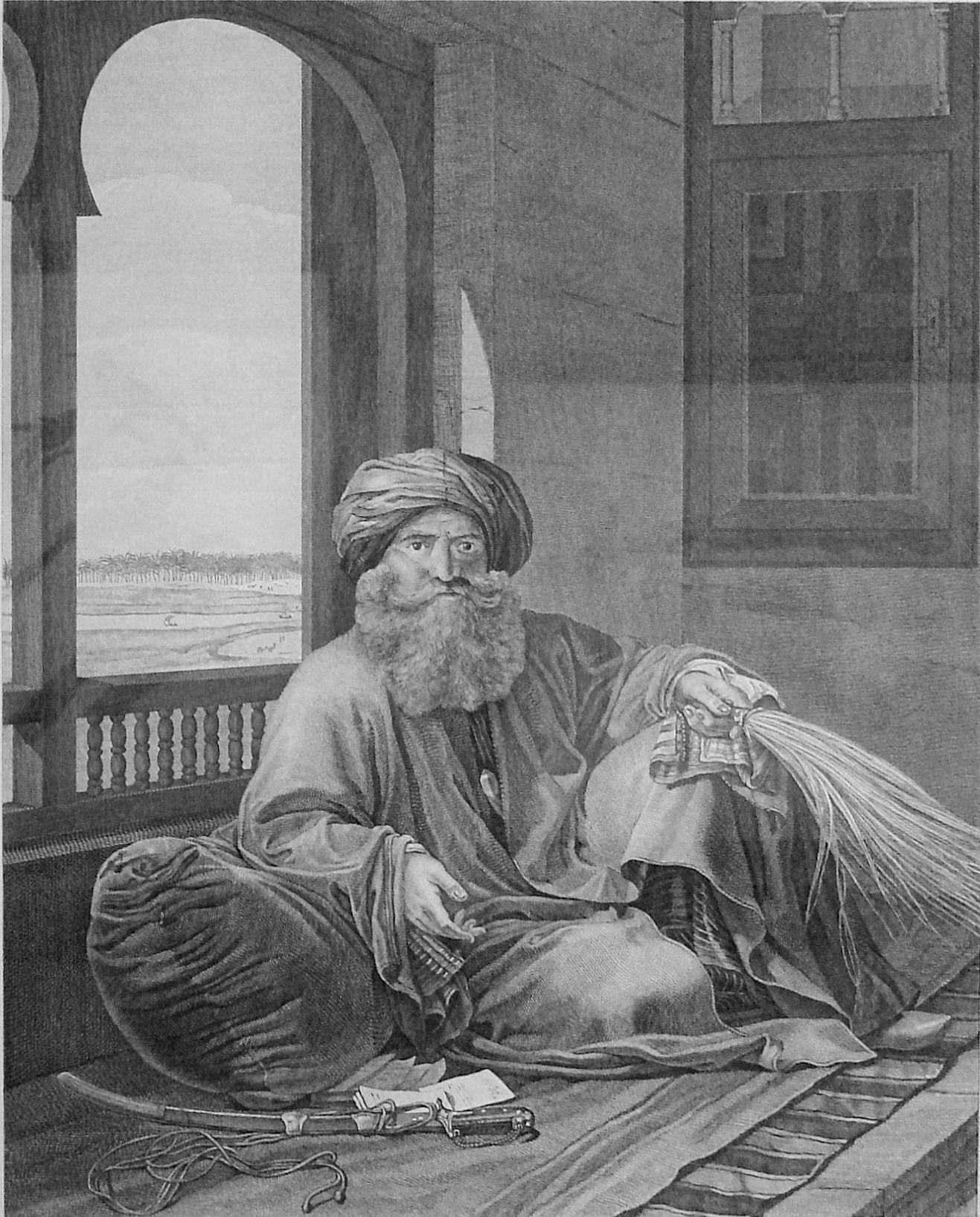
Murad Bey by Dutertre in Description de l'Égypte, 1809

The typographical quality of the texts, the beauty of engravings, and the unusual formats (the Mammutfolio is 1m x 0.81m) makes Description de l'Égypte an exceptional work.

The first edition usually consists of nine volumes of text, one volume with description of the plates and ten volumes of plates. Two additional volumes in Mammut size (also called Elephant plates) contain plates from Antiquités and État moderne and finally one volume of map plates (Atlas), making for twenty-three volumes in all. Variants in the number of volumes do exist.

The second edition usually consists of thirty-seven volumes, with twenty-four volumes bound in twenty-six books (volume eighteen is a volume split in three books) of text, volume number ten being the description of the plates and ten volumes of plates, plus one volume of maps. The second edition was made at less cost, and is in black and white; the frontispiece, however, is rendered in full color.

The ten volumes of plates consists of 894 plates, made from over 3000 drawings, most of them located in Histoire naturelle volume I and II. Some of these plates contain over 100 individual engravings of flora or fauna on a single plate. 38 of the plates are hand coloured. Some variants of the work may contain a few more plates: for example Bernard J. Shapero Rare Books list a 38 volume second edition with 909 plates.

=== The plates ===
The plates have been republished partly in different works, most notable by "Bibliothèque Image", Taschen GmbH, and "Institut d'Orient" in 1988 and a subsequent edition in 1990.

All the illustrations from the 10 volumes of plates from first edition are visible as galleries in Commons:

- Antiquités, planches, Tome I
- Antiquités, planches, Tome II
- Antiquités, planches, Tome III
- Antiquités, planches, Tome IV
- Antiquités, planches, Tome V
- État moderne. planches, Tome I
- État moderne. planches, Tome II
- Histoire naturelle, planches, Tome I
- Histoire naturelle, planches, Tome II et II bis
- Carte topographique de l’Égypte

== Influence ==
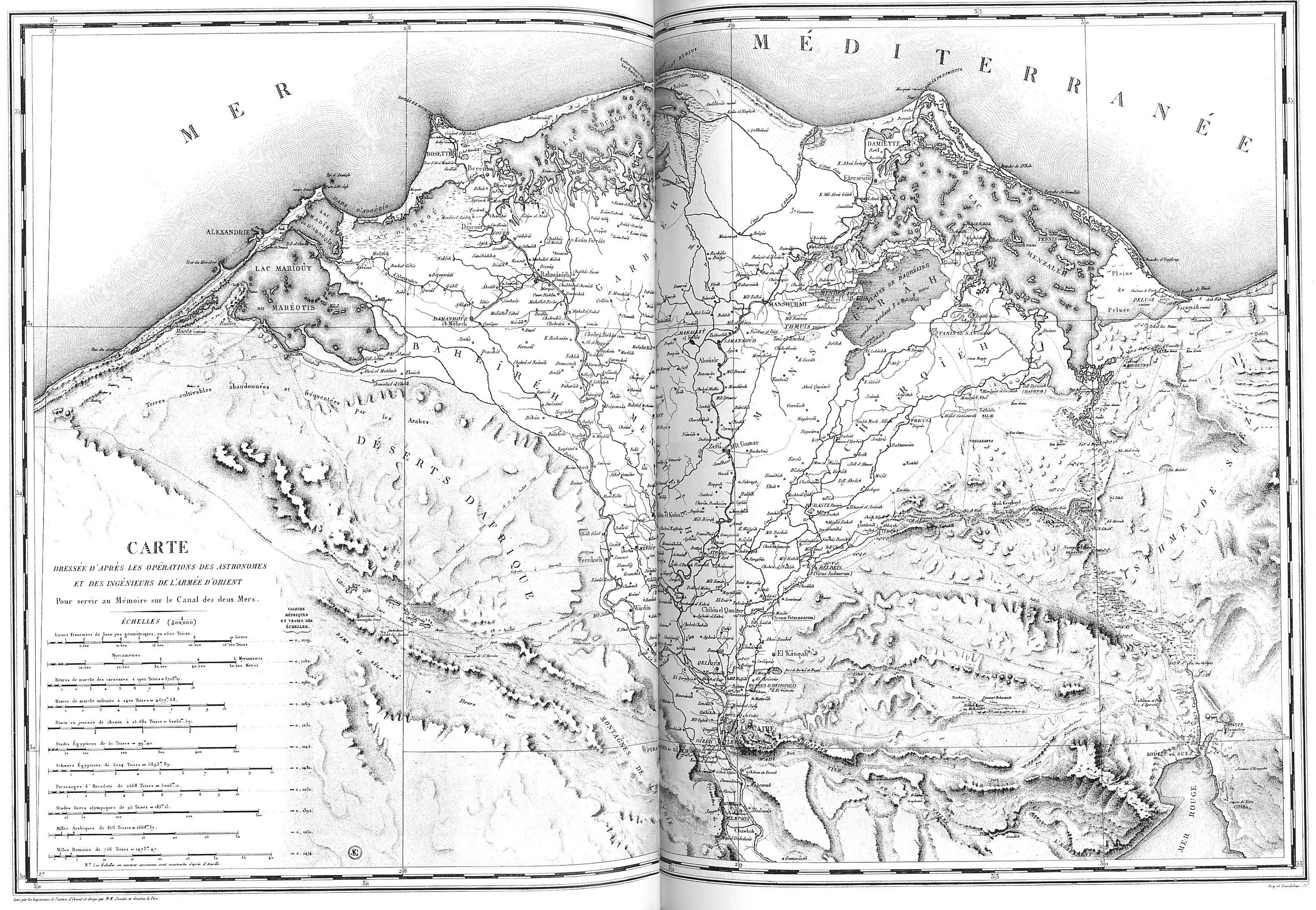
Map of Lower Egypt during the expedition of Napoleon, to be used for the report on the Canal between two seas

Description de l'Égypte has been credited with starting the field of Egyptology, although one historian has argued that the general conception and often-repeated idea that this is a unique and unprecedented work is inaccurate. This aside, many still consider the Description to be foundational to the modern fields of many anthropological and geological sciences; including zoology, geography, and topography, as well as research in various types of hydrology. The work was created as propaganda to push European cultural hegemony across Napoleon's empire. It intended to establish the French as the good caretakers of a neglected land of potential. It excused the teams of researchers studying everything in Egypt to see how the French Empire could profit off of their new territory.

The information gathered for Description went on to inform French policies and proposals surrounding Egypt, which were adopted by Egyptian leaders for administration in the mid-19th century. The maps made for the Description (dubbed Carte de l'Egypte) were used in the plans for a canal through the Isthmus of Suez, amongst other major canals in Egypt for the next several decades. The maps themselves were also written in the Latin alphabet instead of the Arabic alphabet. In her article "Map, Text and Image. The Mentality of Enlightened Conquerors", Dr. Anne Godlewska discusses how this was a deliberate choice where "the landscape of Egypt was to be changed from a 'chaos of Arabic names' to European Order."

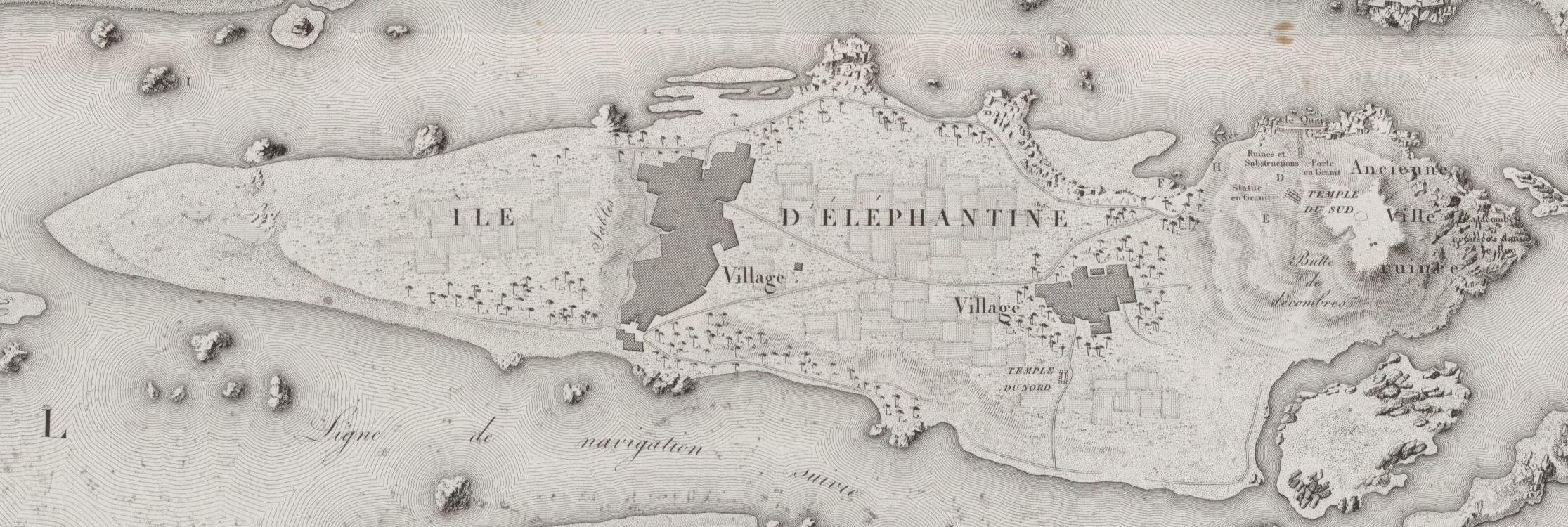
Map of Île d'Éléphantine from Description de l'Egypte. Published in 1809

Description showed Egypt as a land open for the taking, representing France as the well-intended caretakers who were working to document and preserve Egypt’s wealth and history. This set precedence for later conquests by Europeans into non-European territories. It established a reputation of historical interest and caregiving to maintain power over the people in their colonies and their resources.

== False reports on destruction of the originals ==
It was incorrectly reported that the original manuscript of the Description de l'Égypte was destroyed in a fire at the Institut d'Égypte (Egyptian Scientific Institute) on December 17, 2011, during clashes between protestors and the military. In fact, the burnt building's collection had contained a set of the 23-volume first print edition, which was saved without irreparable damage. Furthermore, according to a statement by the country's minister of culture, at least two more complete sets of the same original edition remained in Egypt. The majority of the original manuscript material for the Description resides in Paris' National Archives and National Library.

== Editions ==
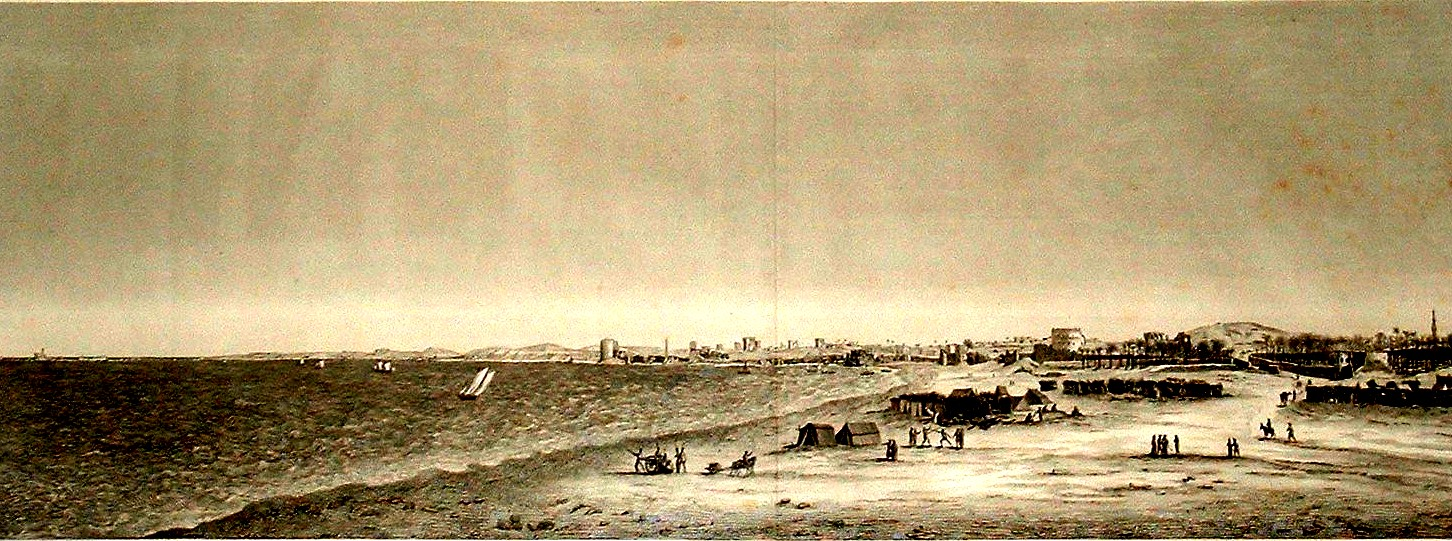

There appear to be several variants of these editions, especially the first edition, containing one or more extra volumes. For instance, the Lauinger Library exhibition (Georgetown University Library), November 2000 - January 2001, lists a copy of a first edition presented to Bernardino Drovetti, the French consul general in Egypt from 1802 to 1814 and 1821–1826, as having 29 volumes, while a "standard" first edition contains 23 (20 plus 3 Mammutfolio).

The dates given on the title pages are often considerably earlier than the actual publication date. For example, Book 8, Volume I (Histoire Naturelle) of the first edition has 1809 on the title page, but its accepted publication date is 1826 (1825 for Arachnids PDF). The geographical volume (which contains maps) was not printed before 1828, even though the volumes are dated 1818 and 1826 respectively.

=== First edition (Imperial edition) ===
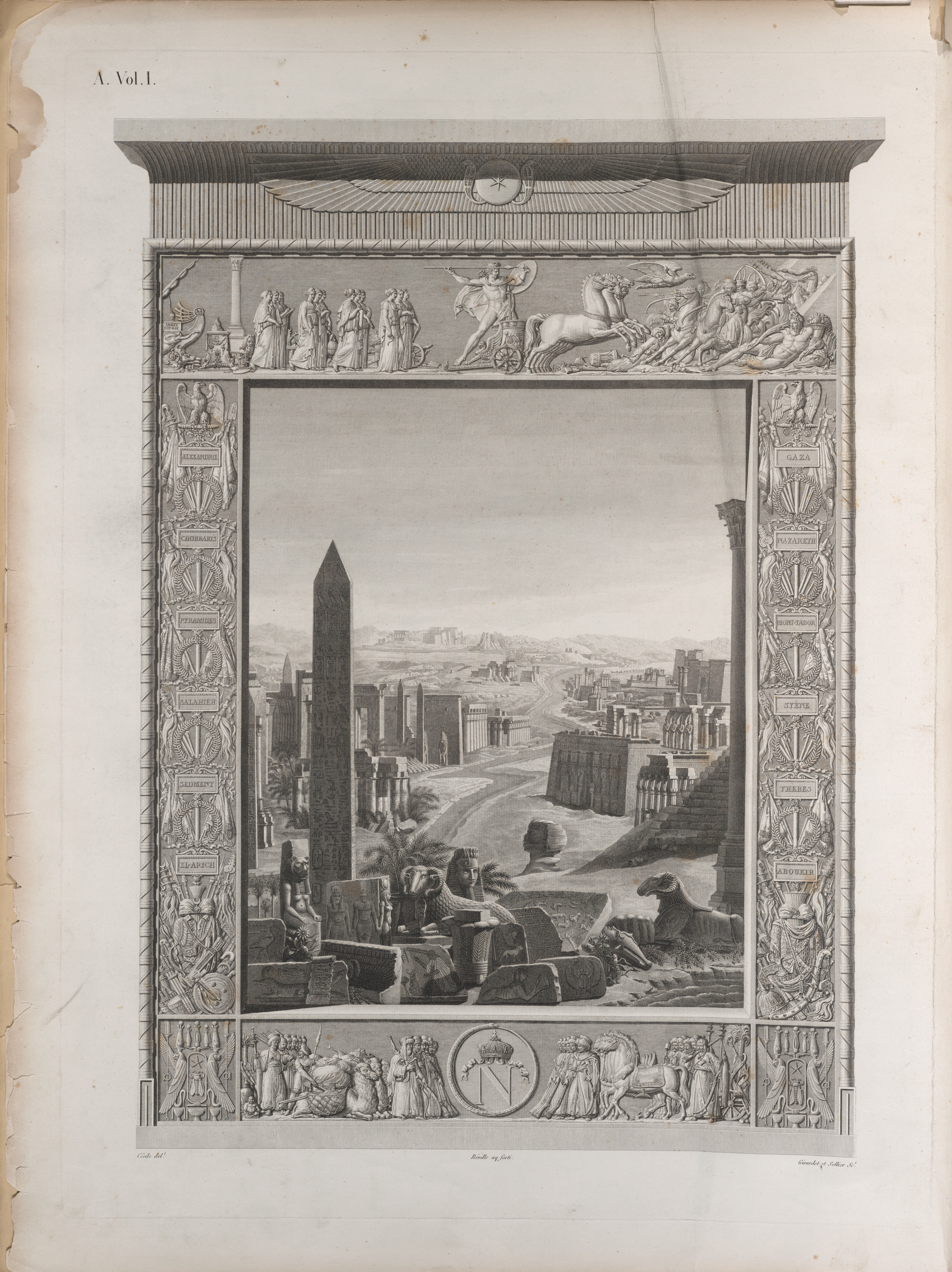
Frontispiece to the first edition

- Book 01 (1809), Volume I – Antiquités, Descriptions.
- Book 02 (1818), Volume II – Antiquités, Descriptions.
- Book 03 (1809), Volume I – Antiquités, Mémoires.
- Book 04 (1818), Volume II – Antiquités, Mémoires.
- Book 05 (1809), Volume I – Etat Moderne.
- Book 06 (1822), Volume II – Etat Moderne.
- Book 07 (1822), Volume II – Etat Moderne (2´ Partie).
- Book 08 (1809), Volume I – Histoire Naturelle.
- Book 09 (1813), Volume II – Histoire Naturelle.
- Book 10 (18xx), Volume I – Préface et explication des planches.
- Book 11 (1809), Volume I – Planches: Antiquités.
- Book 12 (18xx), Volume II – Planches: Antiquités.
- Book 13 (18xx), Volume III – Planches: Antiquités.
- Book 14 (18xx), Volume IV – Planches: Antiquités.
- Book 15 (1822), Volume V – Planches: Antiquités.
- Book 16 (1809), Volume I – Planches: Etat Moderne.
- Book 17 (1817), Volume II - Planches: Etat Moderne.
- Book 18 (1809), Volume I – Planches: Histoire Naturelle.
- Book 19 (1809), Volume II – Planches: Histoire Naturelle.
- Book 20 (1809), Volume IIbis – Planches: Histoire Naturelle.
- Book 21 (18xx), Volume I – Planches: Antiquités ("Mammutfolio").
- Book 22 (18xx), Volume I – Planches: Etat Moderne ("Mammutfolio").
- Book 23 (1818), Volume I – Planches: Carte géographiques et topographique ("Mammutfolio").

=== Second edition (Panckoucke edition) ===
Frontispiece to the second edition

- Book 01 (1821), Volume I – Tome Premier Antiquités-Descriptions.
- Book 02 (1821), Volume II – Tome Deuxième Antiquités-Descriptions.
- Book 03 (1821), Volume III – Tome Troisième Antiquités-Descriptions.
- Book 04 (1822), Volume IV – Tome Quatrième Antiquités-Descriptions.
- Book 05 (1829), Volume V – Tome Cinquième Antiquités-Descriptions.
- Book 06 (1822), Volume VI – Tome Sixième Antiquités-Mémoires.
- Book 07 (1822), Volume VII – Tome Septième Antiquités-Mémoires.
- Book 08 (1822), Volume VIII – Tome Huitième Antiquités-Mémoires.
- Book 09 (1829), Volume IX – Tome Neuvième Antiquités-Mémoires et Descriptions.
- Book 10 (1823), Volume X – Explication Des Planches, D'Antiquités.
- Book 11 (1822), Volume XI – Tome Onzième Etat Moderne.
- Book 12 (1822), Volume XII – Tome Douzième Etat Moderne.
- Book 13 (1823), Volume XIII – Tome Treizième Etat Moderne.
- Book 14 (1826), Volume XIV – Tome Quatorzième Etat Moderne.
- Book 15 (1826), Volume XV – Tome Quinzième Etat Moderne.
- Book 16 (1825), Volume XVI – Tome Seizième Etat Moderne.
- Book 17 (1824), Volume XVII – Tome Dix-Septième Etat Moderne.
- Book 18 (1826), Volume XVIII – Tome Dix-Huitième Etat Moderne.
- Book 19 (1829), Volume XVIII – Tome Dix-Huitième (2' partie) Etat Moderne.
- Book 20 (1830), Volume XVIII – Tome Dix-Huitième (3' partie) Etat Moderne.
- Book 21 (1824), Volume XIX – Tome Dix-Neuvième Histoire Naturelle, Botanique-Météorologie.
- Book 22 (1825), Volume XX – Tome Vingtième Histoire Naturelle.
- Book 23 (1826), Volume XXI – Tome Vingt-Unième Histoire Naturelle, Minieralogie-Zoologie.
- Book 24 (1827), Volume XXII – Tome Vingt-Deuxième Histoire Naturelle, Zoologie. Animaux Invertébrés (suite).
- Book 25 (1828), Volume XXIII – Tome Vingt-Troisième Histoire Naturelle, Zoologie. Animaux Invertébrés (suite). Animaux Venteures.
- Book 26 (1829), Volume XXIV – Tome Vingt-Quatrième Histoire Naturelle, Zoologie.
- Book 27 (1820), Volume I – Planches: Antiquités.
- Book 28 (182x), Volume II – Planches: Antiquités.
- Book 29 (1822), Volume III – Planches: Antiquités.
- Book 30 (182x), Volume IV – Planches: Antiquités.
- Book 31 (1823), Volume V – Planches: Antiquités.
- Book 32 (1822), Volume I – Planches: Etat Moderne.
- Book 33 (1823), Volume II – Planches: Etat Moderne.
- Book 34 (1826), Volume I – Planches: Histoire Naturelle.
- Book 35 (1826), Volume II – Planches: Histoire Naturelle.
- Book 36 (1826), Volume IIbis – Planches: Histoire Naturelle.
- Book 37 (1826), Volume I – Planches: Atlas géographique.

== See also ==
- List of most expensive books and manuscripts
- Orientalism
