= Tessie Camilleri =

First female graduate at the University of Malta

- Born: January 6, 1901
- Died: October 2, 1930 (aged 29)
- Education: University of Malta

Tessie Camilleri (6 January 1901 – 2 October 1930) was the first female graduate at the University of Malta.

== Life ==
Camilleri was born into a well-educated family from Sliema. One of her aunts was an inspector of schools, while three others ran a private school in Valletta.

Camilleri matriculated in June 1919, and entered the University of Malta in October 1919. At the university, she read English literature, philosophy and Latin literature. She graduated B.Litt on 2 May 1922. She later married Edgar Staines OBE, an administrator at the University of Malta (Secretary to the University Council), who in later years was a prominent Civil Servant, Custodian of Enemy Property during and after the War, and a Member of the Executive Council in the British Administration, with whom she had four children, notably Robert (a Rhodes Scholar at Oxford University) and Patrick (a graduate of Manchester University and a prominent Civil Servant, economist and historian). She died at the age of 29 on 2 October 1930.

The 2 May 1922 edition of the Daily Malta Chronicle reported on her graduation, stating "Miss Camilleri had greatly distinguished herself in the course of literature, revealing intellectual endowments and attainments of no mean order, and we heartily congratulate her on her well-deserved success which has gained for her the distinction of being the first lady graduate of the University of Malta."

== Legacy ==
In 2007, the University of Malta named one of its walkways Vjal Tessie Camilleri in tribute to her.
