= Xagħra Stone Circle =

Archaeological site on Gozo, Malta

- Iċ-Ċirku tax-Xagħra (Maltese)
- Xagħra Hypogeum; Brochtorff Circle
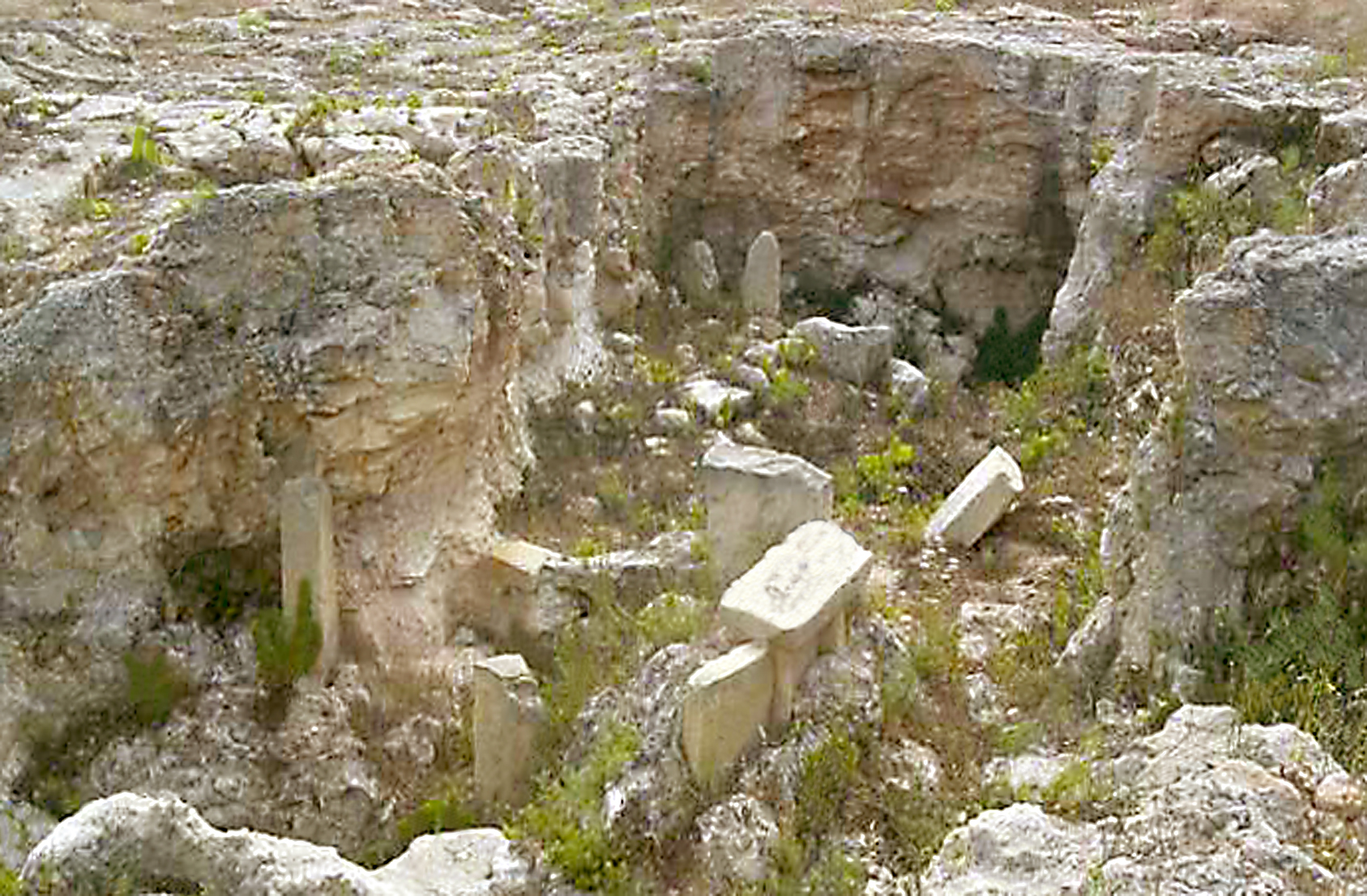
- Remains of the Xagħra Stone Circle

- Location within Malta
- 36°2′47″N 14°15′53″E
- Type: Hypogeum
- Periods: Żebbuġ phase Tarxien phase Tarxien Cemetery phase Borġ in-Nadur phase
- Location: Xagħra, Gozo, Malta

History
- Built: c. 4100–3800 BC (earliest remains) c. 3000–2400 BC (main burial ground)
- Abandoned: before 2000 BC

Site notes
- Material: Limestone
- Excavation dates: 1826 and 1987–1994
- Condition: Ruins
- Owner: Government of Malta
- Management: Heritage Malta
- Public access: No

The Xagħra Stone Circle (Maltese: Iċ-Ċirku tax-Xagħra), also known as the Xagħra Hypogeum or the Brochtorff Circle, is a Neolithic funerary complex located in Xagħra, Gozo, Malta. It consists of a series of caves which were used to bury the dead, and which were surrounded by a walled enclosure. It mainly dates back to around 3000 to 2400 BC, although the earliest tombs at the site date back to 4100 to 3800 BC. The caves collapsed sometime before 2000 BC, and the site was later used for domestic and agricultural purposes.

After being discovered in the late 18th century, the site was excavated in the 1820s before being reburied and forgotten. It was rediscovered in 1964, and major excavations took place from 1987 to 1994. It is the only prehistoric stone-enclosed hypogeum in Europe, and is regarded as one of the most important archaeological sites in Malta along with the megalithic temples and the Hypogeum of Ħal-Saflieni. Recent dating through AMS has added scores of new date estimates of the burials as part of the ERC-funded FRAGSUS project and the ToTL project. The isotopic studies indicate changing dietary and climatic conditions and link with broader changes in the local environment.

== Etymology ==
When first discovered in 1788, the site was simply described as an "ancient structure" without a name or description. After it was depicted in paintings by Charles Frederick de Brocktorff in the 1820s, the site was commonly referred to as the Brochtorff Circle, although it is not known who came up with this name.

The site eventually became known as the Xagħra Stone Circle or the Gozo Stone Circle. According to the archaeologist David Trump, these names are misnomers because 'Stone Circles' in northern Europe and the British Isles refer to a different type of Neolithic structure. In 2009, Trump coined the term Xagħra Circle as the name best describing the site.

== Site ==
The Xagħra Stone Circle originally consisted of a walled enclosure surrounding caves which were used as a necropolis. It has some similarities to the Hypogeum of Ħal-Saflieni, a prehistoric funerary complex on the main island of Malta. However, Ħal-Saflieni is a man-made carved structure, while the Xagħra Stone Circle consists of natural caves which were adapted into a cemetery. Excavations at the site have shown that the bodies of the deceased were dismembered, and the different body parts were buried at separate places.

The site was the burial ground of the same community which built the nearby Ġgantija temple, which is now well-preserved. Several other temples might have stood in the vicinity, including at Santa Verna (where a few megaliths which are probably the remains of an important temple were found) and Ta' Ġesù.

The earliest tombs at the site date back to between 4100 and 3800 BC, during the Żebbuġ phase (although new chronology suggests the start date is probably closer to 3800 BC) of Maltese prehistory. There was limited activity from 3800 to 3000 BC, but pottery and dated bones demonstrate that burials were taking place in the caves and rock cut tomb, even though much of this material was probably reworked when the site was expanded and elaborated during the later Ggantija and Tarxien periods. Thus most of the site activity dates from 3000 to 2400 BC, associated with the insertion of megalithic stones into the subterranean complex to form compartments for burial areas. The caves in which the complex was built were prone to collapse, and they weakened over time so megaliths were used in an attempt to stabilize the roof. The structure finally collapsed at some point before 2000 BC. When excavated, parts of the roof were found sunken into the top of the cave in the East Cave zone.

During the Bronze Age, the site was probably used for non-funerary domestic purposes, and remains from the Tarxien Cemetery and Borġ in-Nadur phases were uncovered in the area. The land was subsequently used for agricultural purposes until the 20th century.

== Discovery, excavations and recent history ==
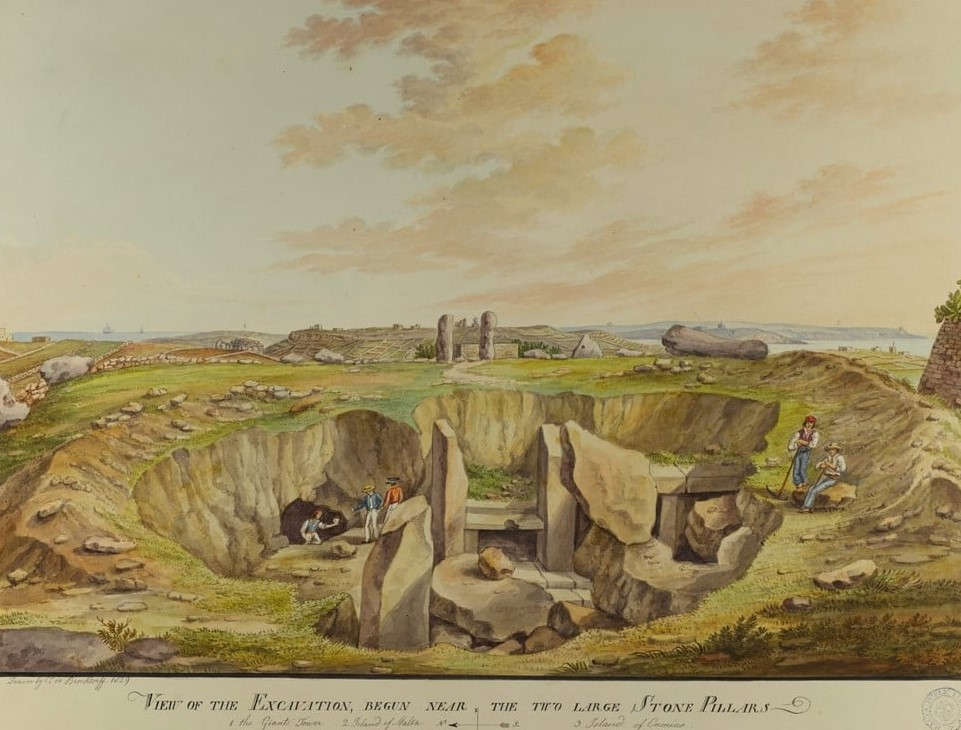
Painting of the Xagħra Stone Circle by Charles Frederick de Brocktorff

The Xagħra Stone Circle was first recorded by Jean Houel in 1788. In the 1820s, Otto Bayer excavated part of the complex through a collapsed cave roof, and Charles Frederick de Brocktorff painted several paintings showing the site during this excavation. The site was filled in by the late 1830s, and its exact location was lost over time. The two monumental pillars which formed the circle's entrance still stood in 1828, but they were subsequently removed.

The complex was rediscovered by the Gozitan researcher Joe Attard Tabone in 1964. It was excavated between 1987 and 1994 by a joint team from the University of Malta, the Maltese Museums Department and the University of Cambridge. The fieldwork and post-excavation study was directed by David Trump, Caroline Malone and Simon Stoddart, assisted by Prof Anthony Bonanno. A succession of student and professional volunteers assisted (see 2009 Malone et al, Mortuary Practices in Prehistoric Malta, Mortuary Customs). These excavations revealed the remains of one of the largest funerary complexes in the Mediterranean, and led to a better understanding of the society who built Malta's megalithic temples. About 220,000 human bones belonging to between 450 and 800 individuals were uncovered during the excavations, along with some animal bones and a series of artifacts, including figurines and architectural fragments. The human remains archive was further analysed as part of the FRAGSUS ERC Advanced Project, headed by Caroline Malone, and published as vol 3 of the Fragsus Monographs, see references below. The new work has extracted aDNA from three individuals, showing that people originated from the eastern Mediterranean area as well as from the Adriatic-central Europe area in the third millennium BC. The new work also examines the 11000 teeth recovered in the excavations and identifies a range of pathologies and health issues in the prehistoric population.

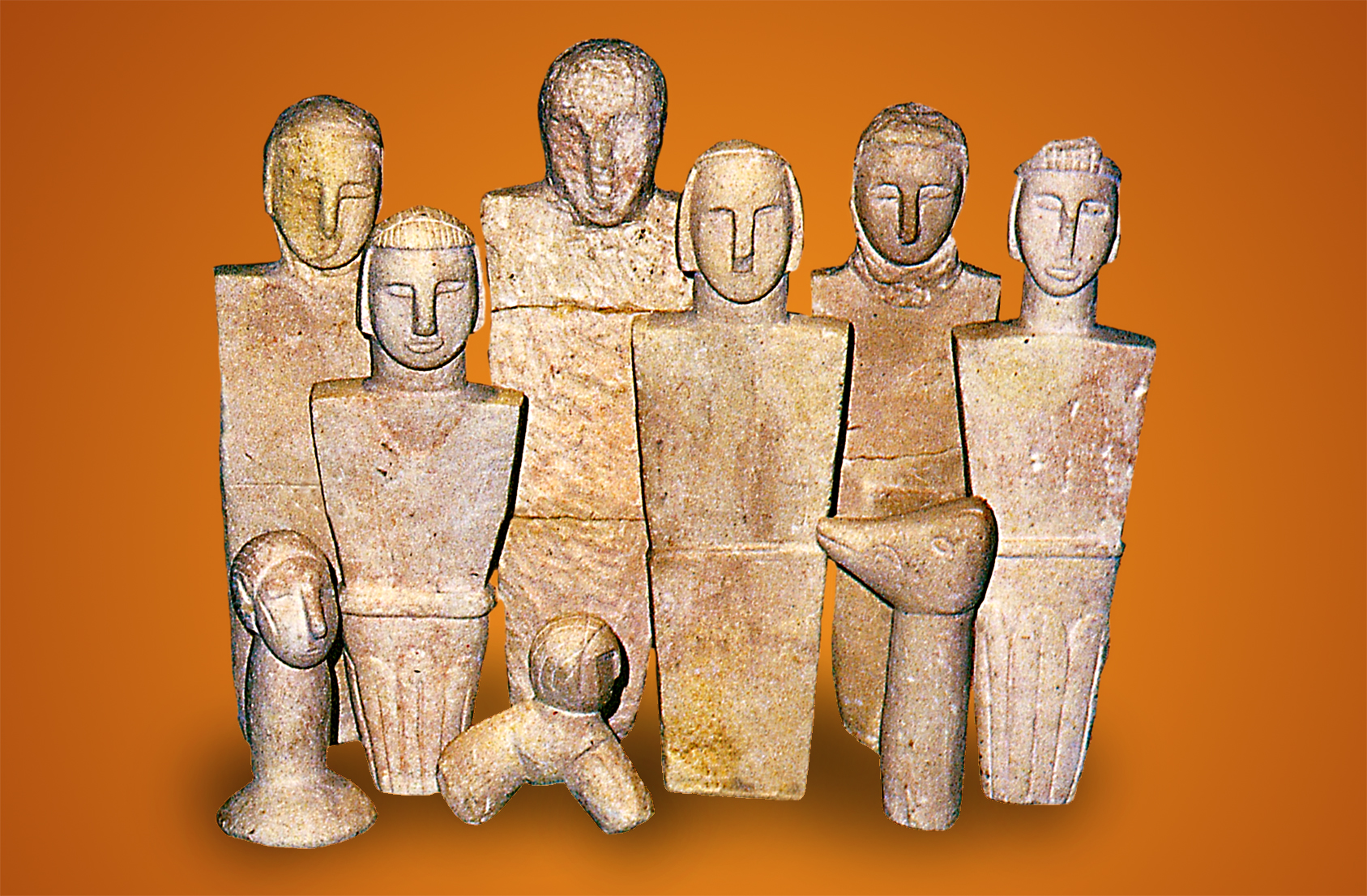
Stone figurines found at the Xagħra Stone Circle, now displayed at the Ġgantija museum

The Xagħra Stone Circle is regarded as one of the most important archaeological sites in Malta. It is the only stone-enclosed hypogeum in Europe, and the only prehistoric necropolis in Malta which was properly excavated – no records were kept when the human remains and artifacts at Ħal-Saflieni were cleared in the early 20th century. Parts of the site remain unstudied, and efforts are being made to preserve the complex, since it is fragile and prone to collapse.

The site is on government-owned land, and it is managed by Heritage Malta. The remains have Class A protection, and they are listed on the National Inventory of the Cultural Property of the Maltese Islands. The site is not accessible to the public.
