= Jacques Renaud Benard =

French engraver (1731 – 1794)

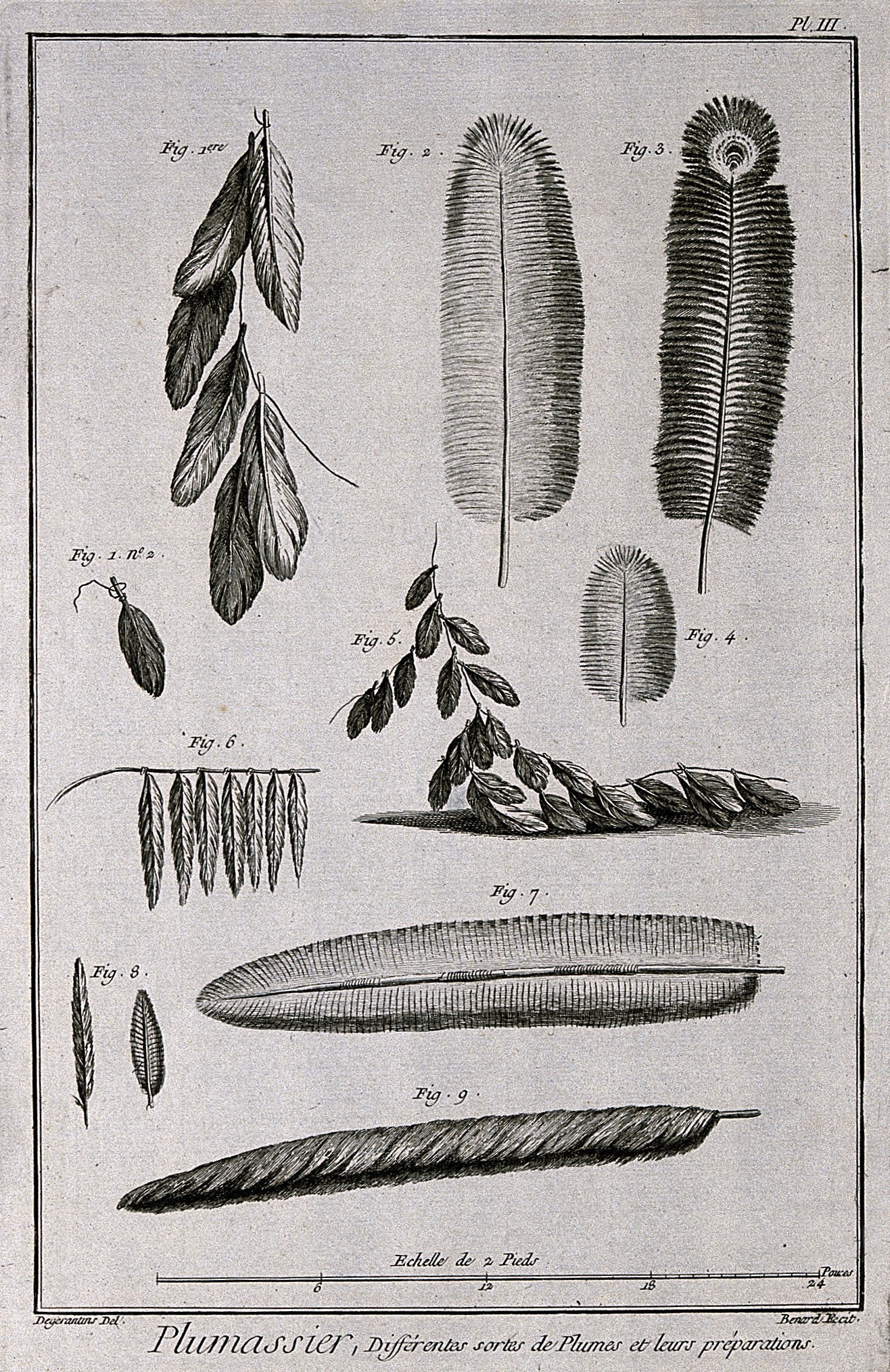
A variety of plumes. Engraving by Jacques Renaud Benard after Degerantin (Wellcome)

Jacques Renaud Benard (13 April 1731 – 4 July 1794), before 2019 incorrectly called Robert Bénard, was a French engraver.

Specialized in the technique of engraving, Benard is mainly famous for having supplied a significant amount of plates (at least 1,800) to the Encyclopédie by Diderot & d'Alembert from 1751.

Later, publisher Charles-Joseph Panckoucke reused many of his productions to illustrate the works of his catalog.

Biographical research established in 2019 that his real name was Jacques Renaud Benard, that he was born in 1731 at Rosny-sous-Bois, and that he died in Paris in 1794.

The signature "Benard fecit" on plates probably indicates the work of his own hand; the signatures "Benard Direx" and "Benard Direxit" indicate the work of the atelier of engravers he directed for many years.
