= Charles-Joseph Panckoucke =

French writer and publisher

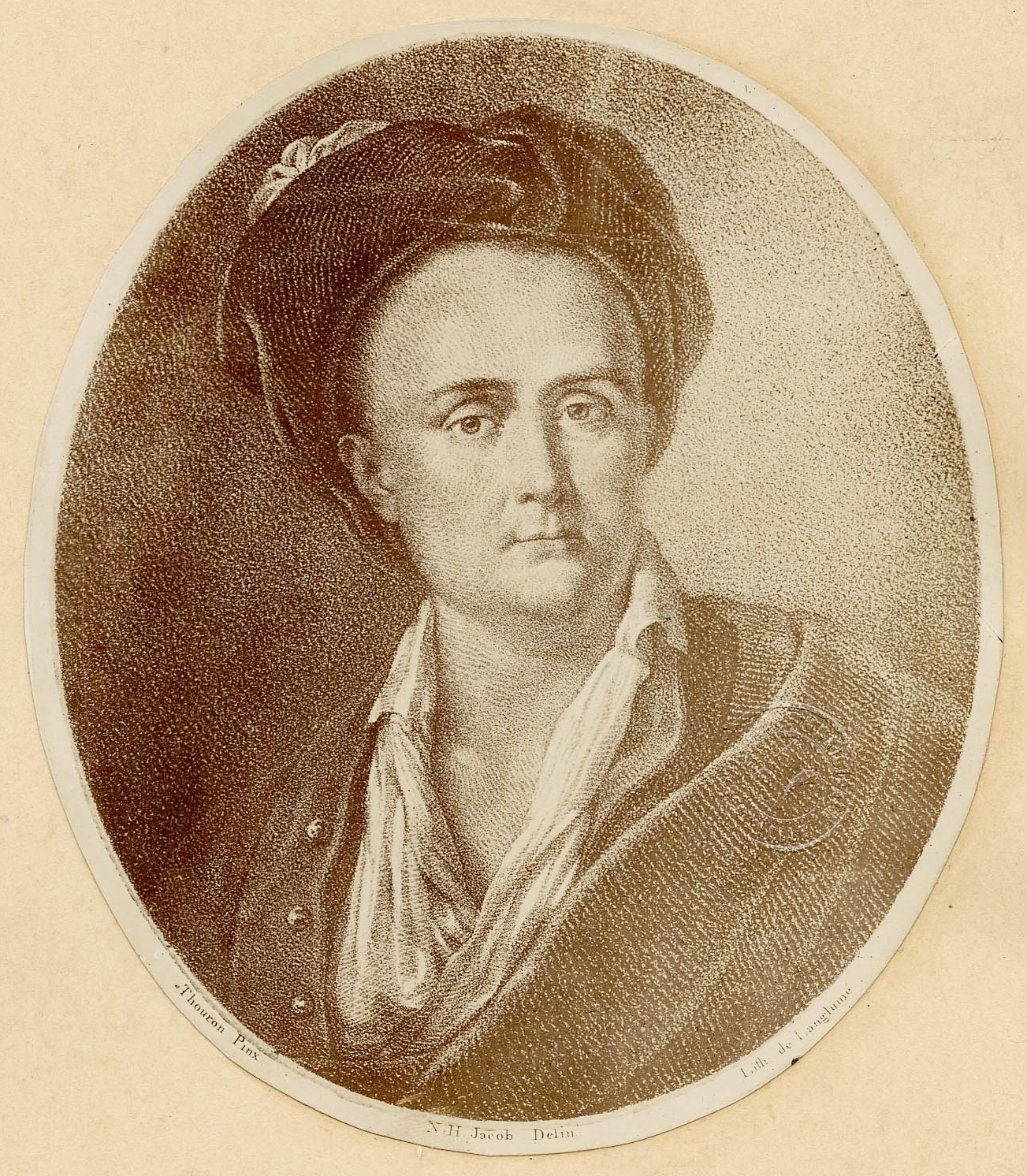
Charles-Joseph Panckoucke

Charles-Joseph Panckoucke (French: [ʃaʁl ʒozɛf pɑ̃kuk]; 26 November 1736 – 19 December 1798) was a French writer and publisher. He was responsible for numerous influential publications of the era, including the literary journal Mercure de France and the Encyclopédie Méthodique, a successor to the Encyclopédie by Denis Diderot.

== Early life ==
Pancoucke was brought up in Lille by his father, who was also an author and a bookseller. Before moving to Paris in 1760, Pancoucke had turned both to writing and translation. Once in Paris, he bought two substantial bookselling and publishing houses. On top of this, he further bolstered his position in the literary world by marrying the sister of Suard, another noteworthy literary figure. When illustrating his catalog, he reused many of engraver Jacques Renaud Benard's productions.

== Publishing Career ==
His first suggestion of a supplement to the Encyclopédie, in 1769 was turned down by Diderot, but Panckoucke persisted. By 1775, Panckoucke had secured a license to publish his supplement, and it appeared as five volumes in 1776 and 1777. Panckoucke also published two volumes of index to the Encyclopédie, prepared by Pierre Mouchon, and appearing in 1780.

Panckoucke's great effort was the Encyclopédie Méthodique, an expansion and rearrangement of the Encyclopédie, with the subject matter organized by subject area rather than alphabetically. He received the license in 1780, and published a first prospectus in 1782. The work outlived him, with his daughter Thérèse-Charlotte Agasse (widow of Panckoucke's partner Henri Agasse) publishing the last of 166 volumes in 1832.

One of Panckouke's influential efforts as a publisher involved the Compte rendu of Jacques Necker. Along with the royal printers, Panckoucke printed 20,000 copies of the Compte, which was sold out within a few weeks.

== Newspapers ==
Pancoucke's career also extended to establishing various newspapers in pre-revolutionary France. He put out two important newspapers, the Journal de Genève and the Journal de Bruxelles and in 1774 he hired Simon-Nicolas-Henri Linguet to edit the latter. However, after only two years editing the Journal de Bruxelles, Pancoucke removed Linguet from his post and replaced him with a new editor, La Harpe, finding Linguet's sniping at his own favoured authors too controversial. Pancoucke further expanded his foothold in journalism when he launched the first daily newspaper, the Jounrnal de Paris.

In 1778, Panckouke also took over publication of the magazine Mercure de France, and later established the Moniteur Universel. The Mercure de France was a venerable publication of great influence among the French arts and humanities, and it has been called the most important literary journal in pre-revolutionary France. The Mercure included news reports from European and American capitals, but also puzzles and riddles and reviews of music, theatre and literature, with the May 8 1784 edition lending 16 pages to a review of the Marriage of Figaro by Pierre-Augustin de Beaumarchais. By the eve of the revolution, the circulation of the Mercure had reached some 20,000.

== Death and legacy ==
He died, aged 62, in Paris. Panckoucke's son, Charles Louis Fleury Panckoucke, continued in the writing and publishing business as well.
