= Il Mediterraneo =

Maltese newspaper published in Italian

- Type: Weekly newspaper
- Founder(s): Carlo Cicognani Cappelli; Tommaso Zauli Sajani
- Language: Italian and English
- Headquarters: Malta
- Country: Malta

Il Mediterraneo (also known as Il Mediterraneo - Gazzetta di Malta) was a newspaper founded in Malta in 1838 by the Italian exiles Carlo Cicognani Cappelli and Tommaso Zauli Sajani, and it remained in circulation until 1874. Published primarily in Italian (with some sections in English), it was one of the main newspapers of the British colonial era in Malta, playing a fundamental role in supporting the exiles of the Italian Risorgimento and in the diffusion of liberal ideals.

== History ==
The newspaper was founded in 1838, at a crucial moment for publishing and politics on the island. At that time, Malta was under the rule of the British Empire and, after decades of strict censorship, the pressure of public opinion led to historic reforms that would culminate in the granting of freedom of the press in 1839.

The founders of the publication were Carlo Cicognani Cappelli and Tommaso Zauli Sajani (1802–1872), two professors and Italian exiles originally from Forlì who had found refuge on the island. The publication was released on a weekly basis.

== Editorial line ==
Il Mediterraneo distinguished itself from the beginning with an explicitly liberal, secular editorial line that was opposed to all forms of despotism. It quickly became the voice of Italian patriots exiled in Malta, openly supporting the unification process of the Peninsula.

The periodical gave great importance to the movements of the Risorgimento: in January 1848, for example, it foreshadowed and actively supported the political unrest that led to the outbreak of the revolution in Sicily, keeping readers and political refugees informed about the developments of the revolts against the House of Bourbon.

Beyond international politics, the newspaper actively dealt with internal Maltese issues. Its pages hosted frequent polemics against the educational policies of the British administration, which was accused of neglecting elementary and higher education on the island, in a climate of strong cultural conflict between state and religious institutions.

== See also ==
- List of newspapers in Malta
