= Michel-Louis-Étienne Regnaud de Saint-Jean d'Angély =

French politician

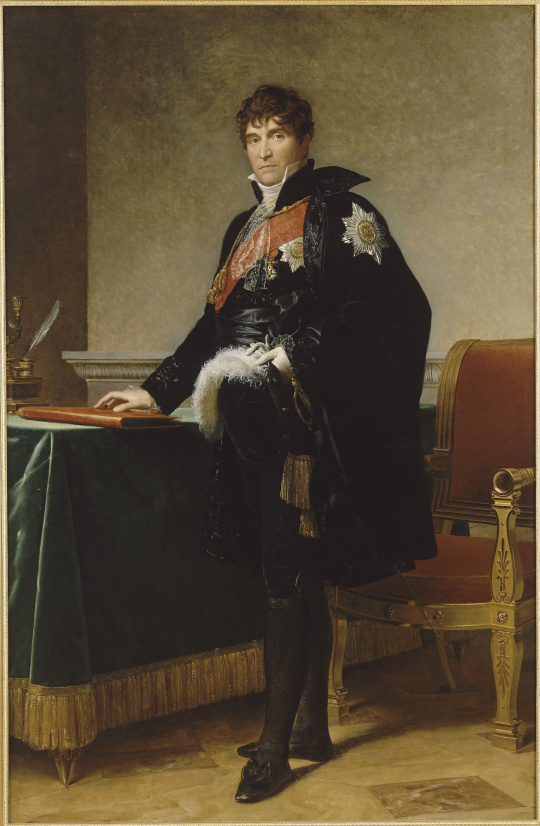
Portrait of Michel Regnaud de Saint-Jean d'Angély by François Gérard (1808).

Michel Louis Etienne Regnaud, later 1st Count Regnaud de Saint-Jean d'Angély (3 December 1761, Saint-Fargeau – 11 March 1819, Paris) was a French politician.

== Biography ==
=== Early activities ===
He was a lawyer in Paris and lieutenant of the maritime provostship of Rochefort. With the outbreak of the French Revolution in 1789, he was elected deputy to the Estates-General by the Third Estate in the sénéchaussée of Saint-Jean-d'Angély.

His eloquence made him a prominent figure in the National Constituent Assembly, where he boldly attacked Honoré Mirabeau, and settled the dispute about the ashes of Voltaire by decreeing that they belonged to the nation.

=== Conflict with radicals ===
The moderation shown by the measures he proposed at the time of King Louis XVI's flight to Varennes, by his refusal to accede to the demands for the king's execution, and by the articles he published in the Journal de Paris and the Ami des Patriotes, marked him out for the hostility of the radical parties.

He was arrested after the revolution of 10 August, but succeeded in escaping, and during the Thermidorian Reaction which followed the fall of Maximilien Robespierre, Regnaud de Saint-Jean d'Angély was appointed administrator of the military hospitals in Paris. His powers of organization brought him to Napoleon's notice.

He accompanied Napoleon during the French invasion of Malta in June 1798, but he became sick and did not participate in the subsequent campaign in Egypt. Regnaud was appointed Commissioner of Government of French-occupied Malta and he was the editor of the propaganda newspaper Journal de Malte before returning to France in November 1798. The following year, he took part in the 18 Brumaire Coup (9 November 1799).

=== Empire and later life ===
Under the Empire, he enjoyed the confidence of Napoleon Bonaparte, and was made councillor of state, president of election in the Conseil d'État, member of the Académie Française, procureur général of the high court, and was created Count Regnaud de Saint-Jean d'Angély in 1808.

He was dismissed on the first Bourbon Restoration, but resumed his posts during the Hundred Days, and, after the battle of Waterloo, persuaded the Emperor Napoleon to abdicate. He was exiled by the government of the Second Restoration, but subsequently obtained leave to return to France. He died on the day of his return to Paris. His supposed memoirs, Les Souvenirs du Comte Regnault de St Jean d'Angély (Paris, 1817), are spurious.

== Family ==
Regnaud had married in 1795 Laure Guesnon de Bonneuil, the daughter of a former Maître d'Hôtel of the Count of Artois. They had no children, but his natural son Auguste Regnaud de Saint-Jean d'Angély became Marshal of France.
