= Institut d'Égypte =

Research center in Egypt

Coordinates: 30.042164°N 31.235928°E

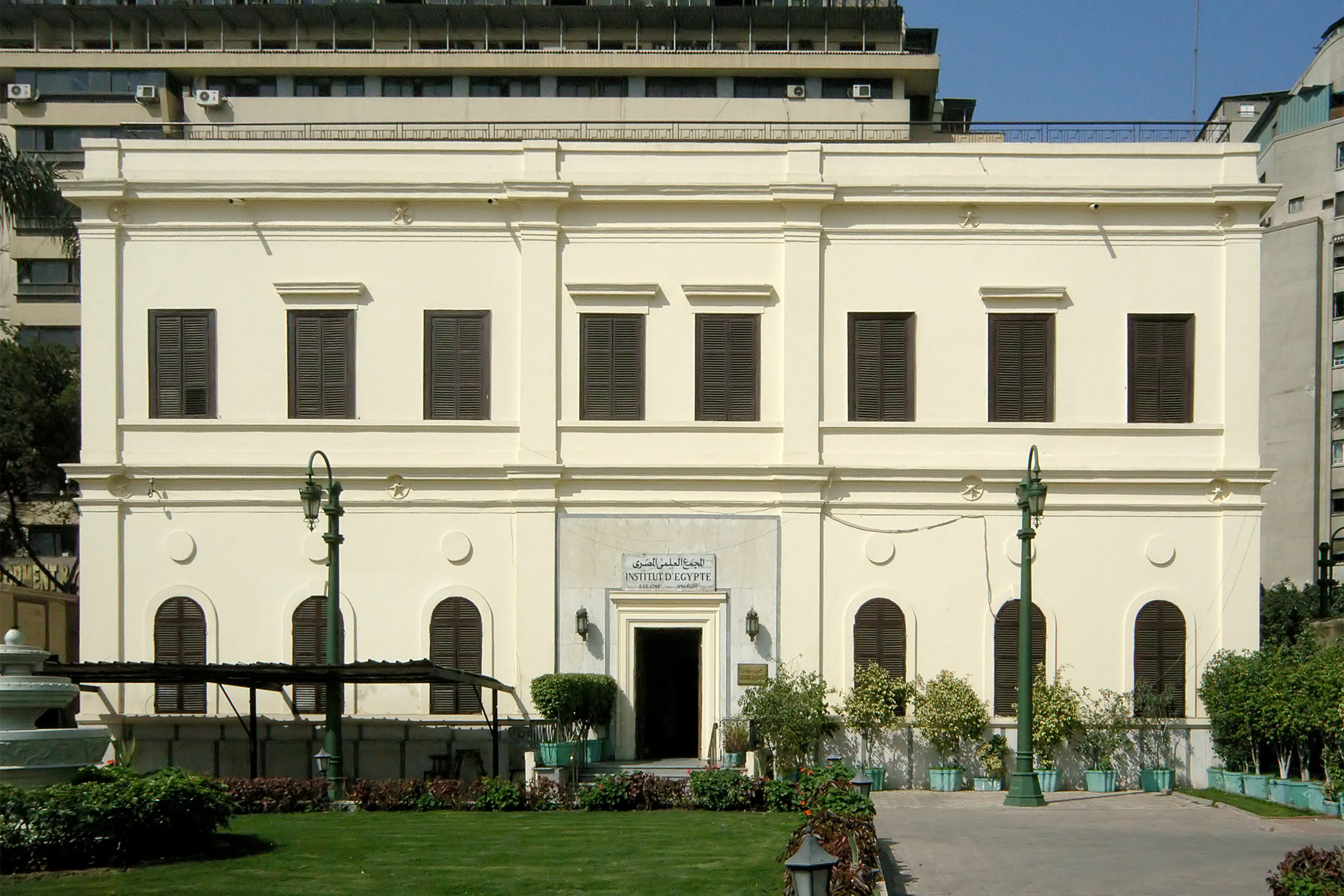
- View of the headquarters
- Formation: 1798
- Headquarters: Cairo, Egypt

The Institut d'Égypte or Egyptian Scientific Institute is a scientific institute and research center in Cairo, Egypt. It specializes in Egyptology. The institute was established in 1798 and is the second oldest scientific institute in Egypt, after Al-Azhar University.

== History ==
The Institut d'Égypte was founded on 22 August 1798 by Napoleon Bonaparte for the Institut de France, their mission was "progress and the propagation of the Enlightenment in Egypt through military force in an invasion."

The institute was organised into sections that cover all the topics of interest and study in mathematics, physics, political economy, literature and arts by the Commission des Sciences et des Arts.

The society first met on 24 August 1798, with Gaspard Monge as president, Bonaparte himself as vice-president and Joseph Fourier and Costaz as secretaries. It had 48 scholars and as with the Institut de France these were organised into sections, divided up as follows:

- 12 members – mathematics section, including Bonaparte himself, Costaz, Fourier, Malus, Monge.
- 10 members – physics and natural history section, including Berthollet, Desgenettes, Dolomieu, Geoffroy Saint-Hilaire.
- 6 members – political economy section, including Cafarelli, Tallien.
- 8 members – literature and arts section, including Denon.

The Institut capitalised on the work of scholars and technical experts of the Commission des Sciences et des Arts and fostered the development of Egyptology so as to support the French expeditionary force. This was further supported by the publication of the Courrier de l'Égypte, first issued 29 August 1798, a propaganda newspaper used to keep the morale of troops high. Research was also presented in Mémoires sur l'Égypte, which was published in four volumes between 1798 and 1801. On 22 November 1799, the Institut took the decision to collect and publish its scholarly work as the Description de l'Égypte. The Institut lasted until its 47th and final meeting on 21 March 1801.

== The Egyptian Society ==
The Institut d'Égypte's activities resumed in 1836 under the name of The Egyptian Society. The work was carried out by French, German and English scholars. It was transferred to Alexandria in 1859, and its name was again changed, this time to Institut Égyptien. The new Institut functioned under the auspices of Egypt's viceroy Sa'id Pasha, and had several prominent members, notably the German botanist Georg August Schweinfurth, as well as Egyptologists Auguste Mariette and Gaston Maspero. Later members included Ahmed Kamal, Egypt's first native Egyptologist, as well as Ahmad Zaki Pasha, a pioneering philologist. The Institut returned to Cairo in 1880. Its previous name was made official by a royal decree in 1918. Henceforth, it was directly under the Royal Palace's auspices. Some of the Institut's more recent members include famed scholar Taha Hussein.

== Overview ==
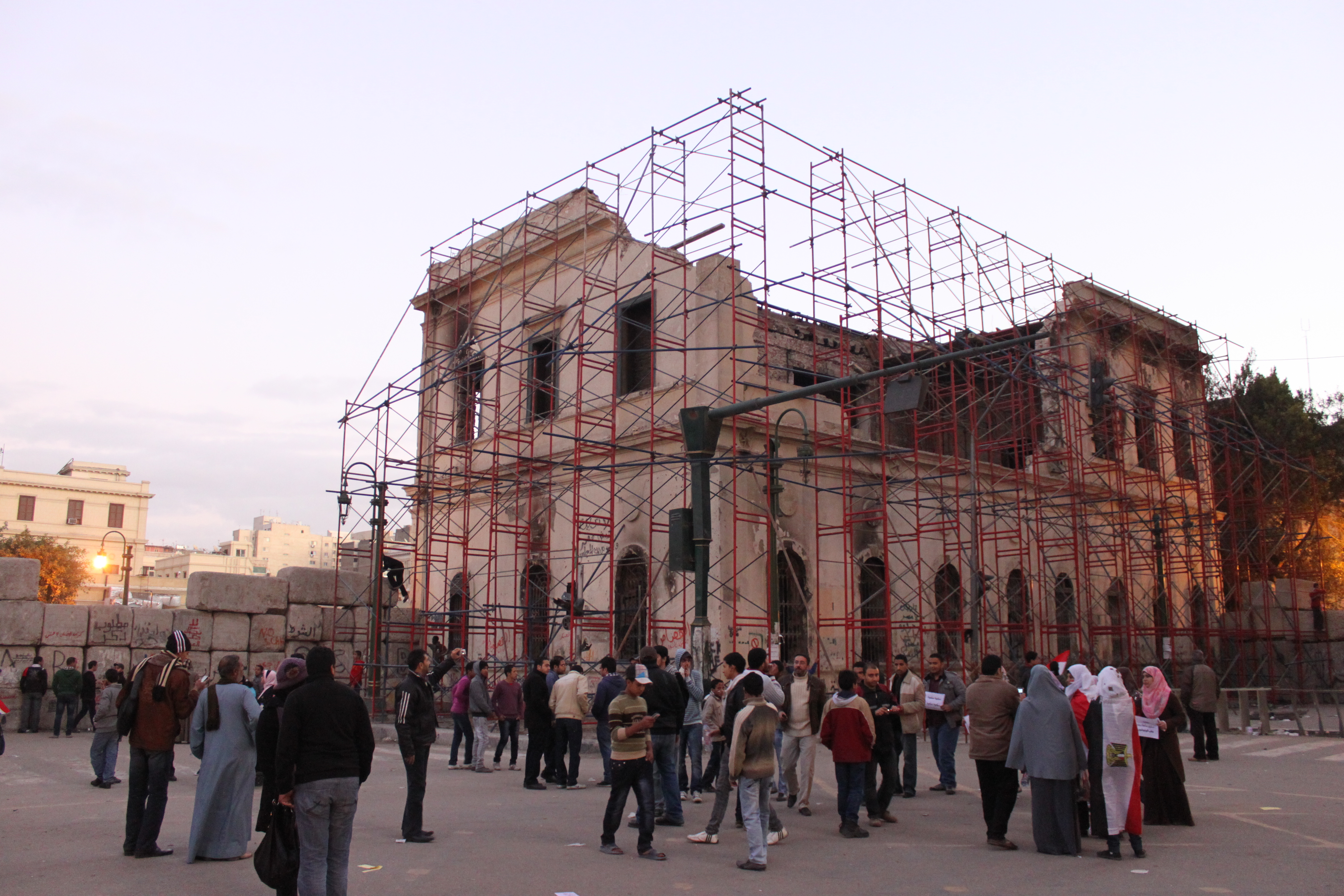
The Institute in January 2012.

The Institute was burnt down on 17 December 2011, as a consequence of continued street clashes in the aftermath of the Egyptian revolution that had erupted on 25 January 2011.

Opposing groups of protesters were engaged in street clashes, hurling flammable materials at each other adjacent to the Shura Council building when a Molotov cocktail, either thrown accidentally or deliberately, penetrated one of the windows of the Institute causing a massive fire. Fire brigade units were unable to promptly reach the scene of the blaze because of continued chaotic conditions on the streets. Volunteers, protesters from opposing factions, rushed into the burning building and were able to save many items and bring them to safety.

Before the blaze, the repository had held over 200,000 rare and antiquarian books and texts, many dating from the Napoleonic era. A first estimate says that only 30,000 volumes have been saved. Lost, however, were the Atlas of Lower and Upper Egypt (1752), the Atlas Handler (1842), the Atlas of the Old Indian Arts and many other important works. It was incorrectly reported in the press that the original 20-volume manuscript Description de l'Égypte (1809–29) was destroyed during these events. The majority of these volumes reside at the National Archives and the Bibliothèque nationale de France, in Paris, France. Professor Mahmoud l-Shernoby, the general secretary of the institute, told that the damage is a "great loss" to Egypt and that those "who caused this disaster should be punished".

=== Renovations ===
Sheikh Sultan al Qassimi, ruler of the emirate of Sharjah in the United Arab Emirates, had indicated his willingness to bear the cost of reconstruction of the building and to donate some of his own rare possessions to it Other works that might be made available include various copies of the Description available in other countries.

== See also ==
- List of libraries
- List of archives
