= Charles Frederick de Brocktorff =

German-Danish artist

- Born: c. 1775–1785
- Died: 1850
- Occupation: Artist
- Military career
- Allegiance: United Kingdom
- Branch: British Army
- Unit: King's German Legion
- Conflicts: Napoleonic Wars

Charles Frederick de Brocktorff (c. 1775/1785 – 1850) was a German-Danish artist and army officer who is best-known for painting watercolours of Malta in the first half of the 19th century.

== Life ==
Brocktorff is believed to have been born sometime between 1775 and 1785.

He served as a officer in the British Army's King's German Legion and fought in the Napoleonic Wars. He resigned in 1809 and moved to the United Kingdom, and in around 1810 he moved to the island of Malta, then a British protectorate, where he settled. He opened a studio in Valletta and he became a successful artist. His family was also involved in the business, and four of his sons became artists as well.

== Works ==
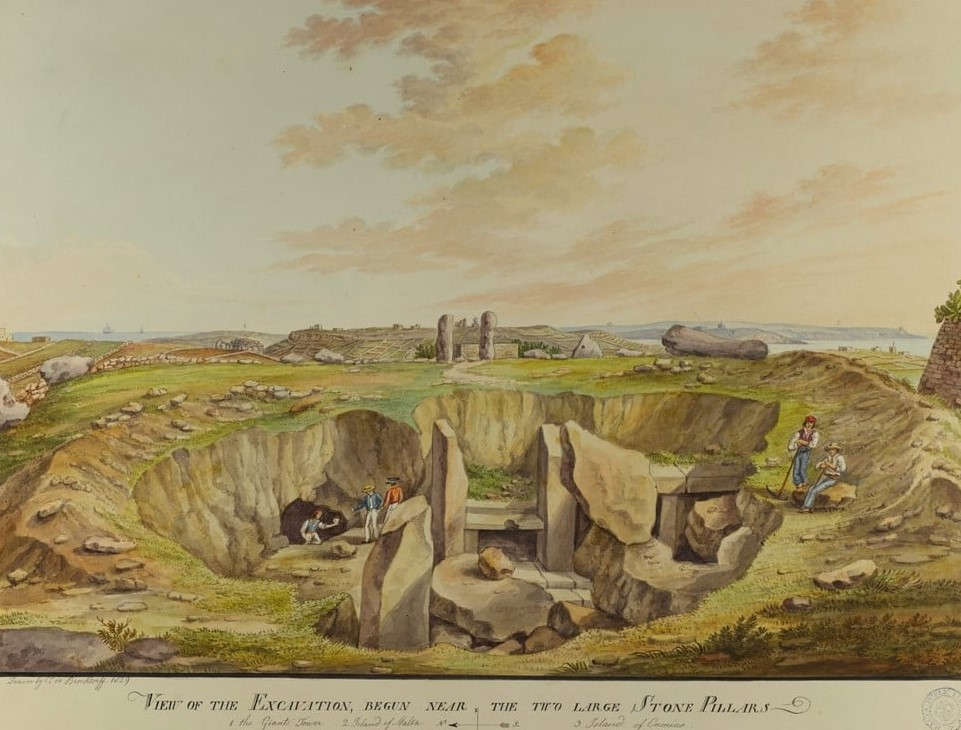
Painting of the Xagħra Stone Circle by Brocktorff, c. 1825

Brocktorff was commissioned to paint many works depicting Malta by foreigners who were either visitors or were serving in the British armed forces on the islands. He painted watercolours of views of the islands, and also portrayed Maltese people from different social classes.

Locations painted by Brocktorff include various landmarks in Valletta, such as St John's Co-Cathedral, the Governor's Palace, the auberges and the Bibliotheca (now known as the National Library of Malta). He also painted views of the Grand Harbour and the Three Cities. Brocktorff also painted scenes of rural locations, including the megalithic remains at Ġgantija and the Xagħra Stone Circle in Gozo. The paintings of the latter are significant since they accurately depict the site before it was deliberately partially destroyed in the 1830s, and in 1972 the archaeologist David H. Trump gave the site its alternative name Brocktorff Circle after the artist.

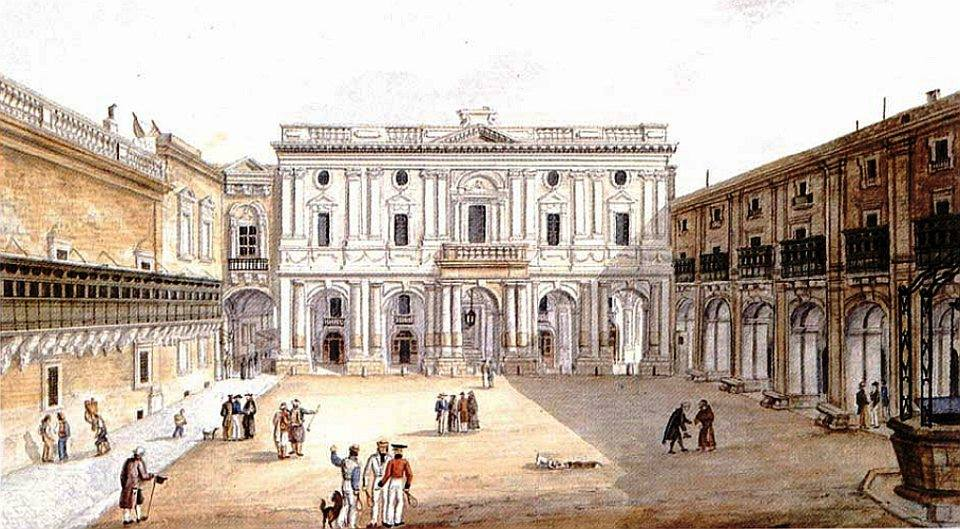
Painting of the National Library of Malta by Brocktorff

Two albums containing a total of 89 watercolours by Brocktorff are located at the National Library of Malta. One of them had originally belonged to Frederick Ponsonby, and it was collected in around 1829 or 1830 when Ponsonby was Governor of Malta. The other was compiled in around 1849 by Henry Benjamin Hanbury Beaufoy after he had purchased the watercolours from an auction of the contents of Stowe House. Both albums were acquired by the library in the 1920s, and studies of their contents were published in 2007 and 2008.

His sons Frederick, Luigi, Giuseppe and Leopold de Brockdorff published several lithographic prints in Malta in the 19th century.
