= Vittorio Barzoni =

Italian writer (1767–1843)

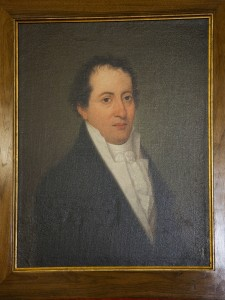
- Portrait of Vittorio Barzoni
- Born: December 17, 1767; Lonato, Republic of Venice
- Died: 22 April 1843 (aged 75); Naples, Kingdom of the Two Sicilies
- Occupations: Writer, journalist
- Years active: Settecento
- Known for: L'Argo; Il Cartaginese
- Parent(s): Cristoforo Barzoni and Giustina Barzoni (née Biemmi)

Academic background
- Education: University of Padua
- Academic advisor: Melchiorre Cesarotti

Academic work
- School or tradition: Counter-revolutionary school

Vittorio Barzoni (17 December 1767 – 22 April 1843) was an Italian writer, mainly of anti-Napoleonic tracts during the French occupation of Northern Italy.

== Biography ==
He was born in Lonato, province of Brescia, then in the Republic of Venice. His father was a mushroom merchant, and afforded Vittorio early education in his town, and later in a college of Verona, but finally at the University of Padua. Inspired by the new political ideas promulgated by the French Revolution, he moved to Venice and published his first work in 1794: Il solitario delle Alpi.

Upon the fall of the Republic, he founded on 16 May 1797 a gazette titled L'Equatore. His writings were often sequestered or suppressed by the occupying French authorities. He soon published a tract: Rapporto sullo stato attuale degli stati liberi d'Italia e sulla necessità che siano fusi in una sola Repubblica, in which he challenged the pretensions of Napoleon to be a liberator of Venice or Italy. By 27 September 1797, he was forced to flee the borders of Venice. With the Treaty of Campoformio ceding the Veneto to Austria, he returned to Venice, and soon published I Romani nella Grecia, which was a thinly veiled criticism of the French occupation as equivalent to the past Ancient Roman occupation and suppression of Greek freedoms. This book became available to both English and German readers.

By 1801, he was forced to abandon Venice for Vienna, but soon also expelled from there by French pressure, and moved to Malta in 1804 where he published various anti-French journals (L'Argo and Il Cartaginese). He soon moved to liberated regions of Spain to continue his diatribes against the French occupation of that country. While initially inspired by the French Revolution, he was not entirely democratic, and aspired for the rule of monarchs and an aristocracy.

In 1814, he returned to Milan. He published in 1825, a dramatic tragedy Narina, but it soon faced censorship. He died in Lonato on 22 April 1843.

== Works ==
- Tributo di un solitario alle ceneri di Angelo Emo, S.n.t. [i.e. Venezia, F. Andreola, 1792] (opera prima).
- Orazione per Verona al generale Buonaparte, [Venice], dalle stampe del cittadino Francesco Andreola, 1797.
- Descrizioni del Signor Barzoni, Venice, Francesco Andreola publishers, 1797.
- Rapporto sullo stato attuale dei paesi liberi d'Italia e sulla necessità ch'essi sieno fusi in una sola repubblica presentato al generale in capo dell'armata francese, Venice, Francesco Andreola. 1797.
- I Romani nella Grecia, London i.e. Venice, F. Rivington and G. Robinson [i.e. F. Andreola], originally published 1797, 1849 edition.
- Memorabili avvenimenti successi sotto i tristi auspici della Repubblica francese, Venice, Francesco Andreola publisher, 1799.
- Rivoluzioni della Repubblica veneta, 2nd volume, Venice, presso Francesco Andreola, 1799.
- Colloquj civici, Venice, 1799.
- Il solitario delle Alpi, Venice, Francesco Andreola publishers, 1800.
- Motivi della rottura del trattato d'Amiens. Discussione politica, Malta, 1804 (later Dissertazione politica, Malta, 1811).
- Operette, Malta, 1808.
- Narina. Dramma, Crema, A. Ronna publisher, 1825.
- Belfonte descritto, Lodi, tipi di Gio. Battista Orcesi, 1825.

== Bibliography ==
- Benzoni, Andrea (1908). La vita di Vittorio Barzoni lonatese. Bobbio: Cella.
- Lumbroso, Alberto (1895). Gli scritti antinapoleonici di Vittorio Barzoni lonatese. Modena: tip. lit. Angelo Namias e C.
- Nuzzo, Giuseppe (1965). "BARZONI, Vittorio". Dizionario Biografico degli Italiani (in Italian). Vol. 7: Bartolucci–Bellotto. Rome: Istituto dell'Enciclopedia Italiana. ISBN 978-88-12-00032-6.
- Giambattista Pagani, Vittorio Barzoni. Elogio, Brescia, G. Quadri, 1843.
- Ulisse, Papa (1895). Vittorio Barzoni e i Francesi in Italia. Venice: stab. tip. f.lli Visentini.
- Renucci, Giorgio (1970). Profilo di Vittorio Barzoni. Florence: L.S. Olschki (estr. da: «Rivista italiana di studi napoleonici», n. 26, anno IX/ 2, pp. 136–150).
- Ivano Lorenzoni; Giancarlo Pionna, eds. (2014). Vittorio Barzoni da Lonato (1767-1843). Lonato del Garda: Fondazione Ugo da Como. ISBN 978-8890703621.
- Pasqualin, Riccardo (2019). Il Leone di Lonato. Saggi su Vittorio Barzoni (1767-1843). Padua: Editrice Il Torchio.
- Pasqualin, Riccardo (2019). "L'immagine delle carceri venete in una controversa descrizione di Vittorio Barzoni". Storia Veneta. 54 (XI): 12–20.
