= Giornale di Malta =

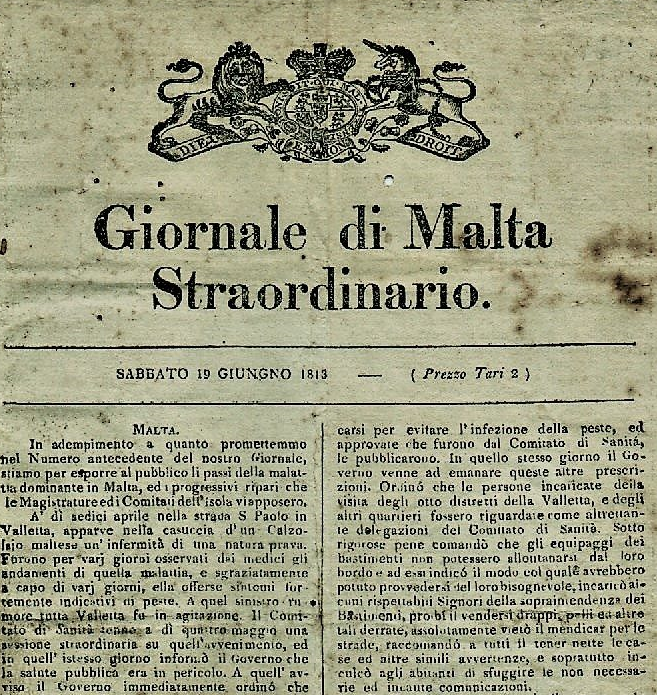
19 June 1813 extraordinary edition of the Giornale di Malta about the outbreak of plague on the island.

The Giornale di Malta was a newspaper published in the British protectorate of Malta between 1812 and 1813. At the time of its issue, it was the only periodical publication in Malta. The Giornale di Malta was preceded by Il Cartaginese (1804–1805) and it was succeeded by Gazetta del Governo di Malta (1813–present).

A total of 94 issues of the newspaper were published. The first 46 issues of the newspaper are believed to have been printed at the press of the Sicilian Regiment in Malta, and later issues were printed at the government printing press.

Copies of the publication are now preserved at the National Library of Malta.
