= Charles-Louis-Fleury Panckoucke =

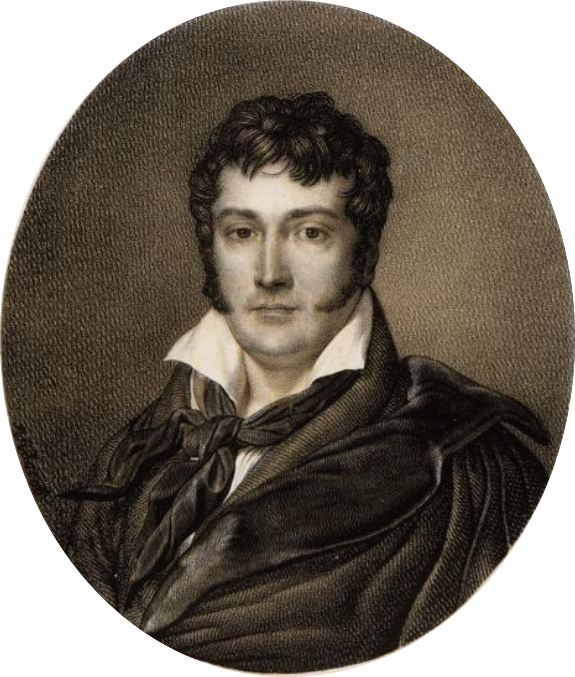
Portrait of Panckoucke c. 1820

Charles-Louis-Fleury Panckoucke (French: [ʃaʁl lwi flø.ʁi pɑ̃.kuk]; 26 December 1780, in Paris – 11 July 1844, in Meudon) was a French writer, printer, bookseller, publisher, translator, and editor. His father was Charles-Joseph Panckoucke.

== Biography ==
Charles-Louis-Fleury Panckoucke was an editor in Paris during the years 1825–1840, in association with a certain Lecointe. Charles-Louis-Fleury initiated the collection Panckoucke or Bibliothèque latine-française; this consists of 178 volumes from 1826 to 1839 and 34 volumes from 1842 to 1849 in the form of expensive books with French translations of Latin classics by ancient Roman authors. In 1847, his nephew Henri Agasse de Cresne became the chief executive of the Panckoucke publishing house.

C. L. F. Panckoucke married Ernestine Anne Desormeaux, an artist and writer, who translated some of the works of Goethe. On the rue des Poitevins, the Parisian residence of the Panckoucke-Desormeaux couple was in the Hôtel de Thou, where Goethe, Alfred de Musset and Alphonse de Lamartine stayed and were impressed by the quality of their accommodations. The couple's country residence was an elegant house built in 1710 facing the Château de Meudon and adjoining the estate of the marquis Claude-Emmanuel de Pastoret. The couple's son Ernest Panckoucke (1808–1886) was also an editor in the publishing business and controlled Le Moniteur Universel. During the Second Empire, the Moniteur Universel was ceded to Paul Dalloz (1829–1887), who married a granddaughter of Charles-Joseph Panckoucke.

The Panckoucke publishing house disappeared at the end of the nineteenth century as a cost reduction measure by the publishing house Dalloz.

Charles-Louis-Fleury Panckoucke was a collector of antiquities and objets d'art. Notably, he made a collection of ancient Greek vases on the theme of Hercules, which is now housed in the château-musée de Boulogne-sur-Mer.

== Selected publications ==
- De l'Exposition, de la prison et de la peine de mort (1807)
- [Monument des] Victoires, conquêtes, désastres, revers et guerres civiles des Français de 1792 à 1815, par une Société de militaires et de gens de lettres, Charles Théodore Beauvais de Préau, Jacques-Philippe Voïart, Ambroise Tardieu, Paris, 1820
- Exemples de style extraits de Racine et de Boileau (1826)
- Lettres de Voltaire et de J. J. Rousseau à C. J. Panckoucke, éditeur de l'encyclopédie méthodique (1828)
- Collection d'antiquités égyptiennes, grecques et romaines, d'objets d'art du XV^{e} siècle, vases et coupes grecs, manuscrits, tableaux et gravures, réunis et classés par C.-L.-F. Panckoucke (1841)
- Œuvres de C. C. Tacite, traduction nouvelle par C.-L.-F. Panckoucke (1838) (See Tacitus.)
- Études et dissertations sur C. C. Tacite (1842)
