= Foglio d'Avvisi =

Newspaper

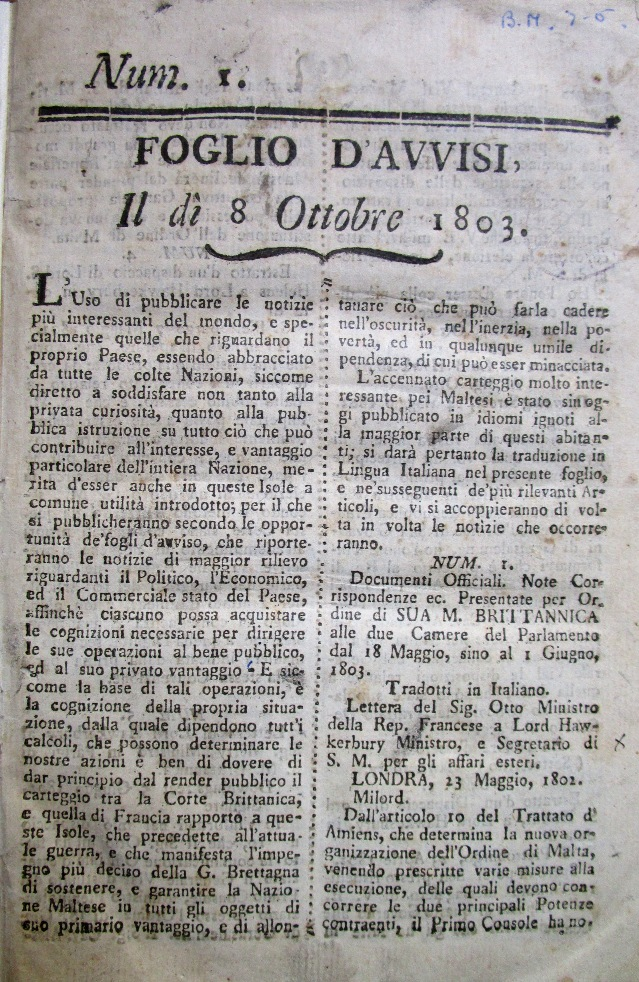
First edition of the Foglio d'Avvisi, dated 8 October 1803

Foglio d'Avvisi was the first newspaper in the British protectorate of Malta, being published between 1803 and 1804. At the time of its issue, it was the only periodical publication in Malta. Foglio d'Avvisi was preceded by the Journal de Malte (1798) during the French occupation of Malta and it was succeeded by L'Argo (1804).

Its publication was controlled by the government, and it contained anti-French propaganda. Circulation of the newspaper was around 500 copies.

Copies of the publication are now preserved at the National Library of Malta.
