= National Library of Malta =

Reference library in Valletta, Malta

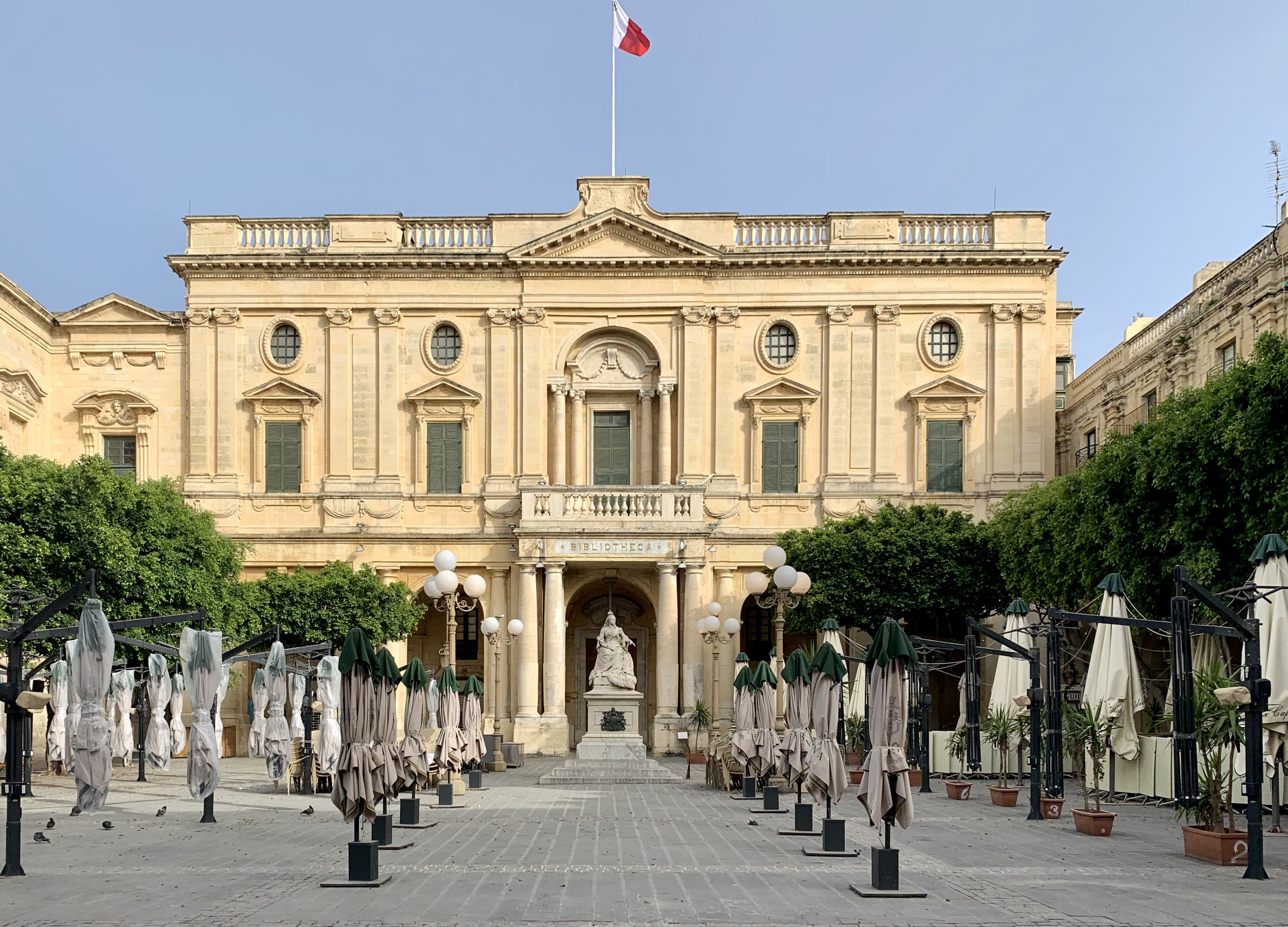
- Façade of the Bibliotheca in 2020
- 35°53′53.9″N 14°30′48.6″E
- Location: 36, Old Treasury Street, Valletta, Malta
- Type: National library
- Established: 1776 (250 years ago) (disputed)

Collection
- Items collected: Reference library
- Legal deposit: Yes

Other information
- Website: Official website

The National Library of Malta (Maltese: Bibljoteka Nazzjonali ta' Malta), often known as the Bibliotheca (Maltese: Bibljoteka), is a reference library in Republic Square, Valletta, Malta. It was founded by Grand Master Emmanuel de Rohan-Polduc in 1776 out of the collections of the knight Louis Guérin de Tencin. It has been a legal deposit library since 1925, and it has the largest collection of Melitensia along with that of the University of Malta. The library also contains the archives of the Order of St. John, the Università of Mdina and the Università of Valletta.

The library is housed in a late 18th-century neoclassical building in the city centre, close to the Grandmaster's Palace, designed by Polish-Italian architects Stefano Ittar and his son Sebastiano Ittar.

== History ==
The origins of the National Library of Malta go back to 1555, when Grand Master Claude de la Sengle decreed that all books belonging to deceased members of the Order of St. John were to be passed to the Order's treasury.

In 1760, Louis Guérin de Tencin, the Bailiff Grand Cross of the Order, purchased a collection of 9700 books which had belonged to Joaquín Fernández de Portocarrero for 7000 scudi. A year later, he opened a public library in a building known as Il Forfantone in Valletta, containing books from his own library as well as Portocarrero's collection, the library of Comm. Sainte-Jay (which was previously kept at the sacristy of the Conventual Church of St. John), and books donated by members of the Order. De Tencin appointed Giovanni Pietro Francesco Agius de Soldanis as librarian, and paid his salary himself. De Tencin died in 1766 before managing to secure funds for maintaining the library.

The Conservatoria in the 1600s

In 1776, Grand Master Emmanuel de Rohan-Polduc formally founded the Bibliotheca Publica, and it was also called the Bibliotheca Tanseana in De Tencin's honour. The Forfantone was considered too cramped to house the new library, so the Polish-born Italian architect Stefano Ittar was commissioned to design a new library building in 1786. The building was built on the site of the Conservatoria, where gold and silver bullion of the Order's treasury were stored. It was completed in 1796, but it remained empty for some years due to the French invasion of 1798. It was eventually inaugurated on 4 June 1812 by Civil Commissioner Sir Hildebrand Oakes, and it became known as the Malta Public Library.

It became a legal deposit library by Act no. II of 1925, and in 1936 it was granted the title of Royal Malta Library by King George V. In 1937, the archives of the Order were transferred to the library from the Public Registry.

In 1976, the Central Public Library was opened in Floriana, and the Valletta library became a research and reference library known as the National Library of Malta.

== Architecture ==
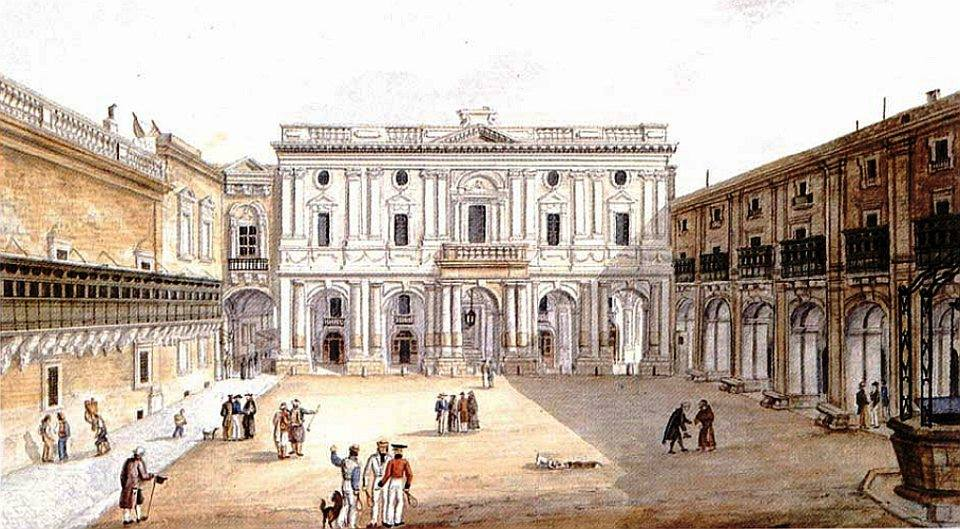
Malta Public Library, Valletta, painting by Charles Frederick de Brocktorff

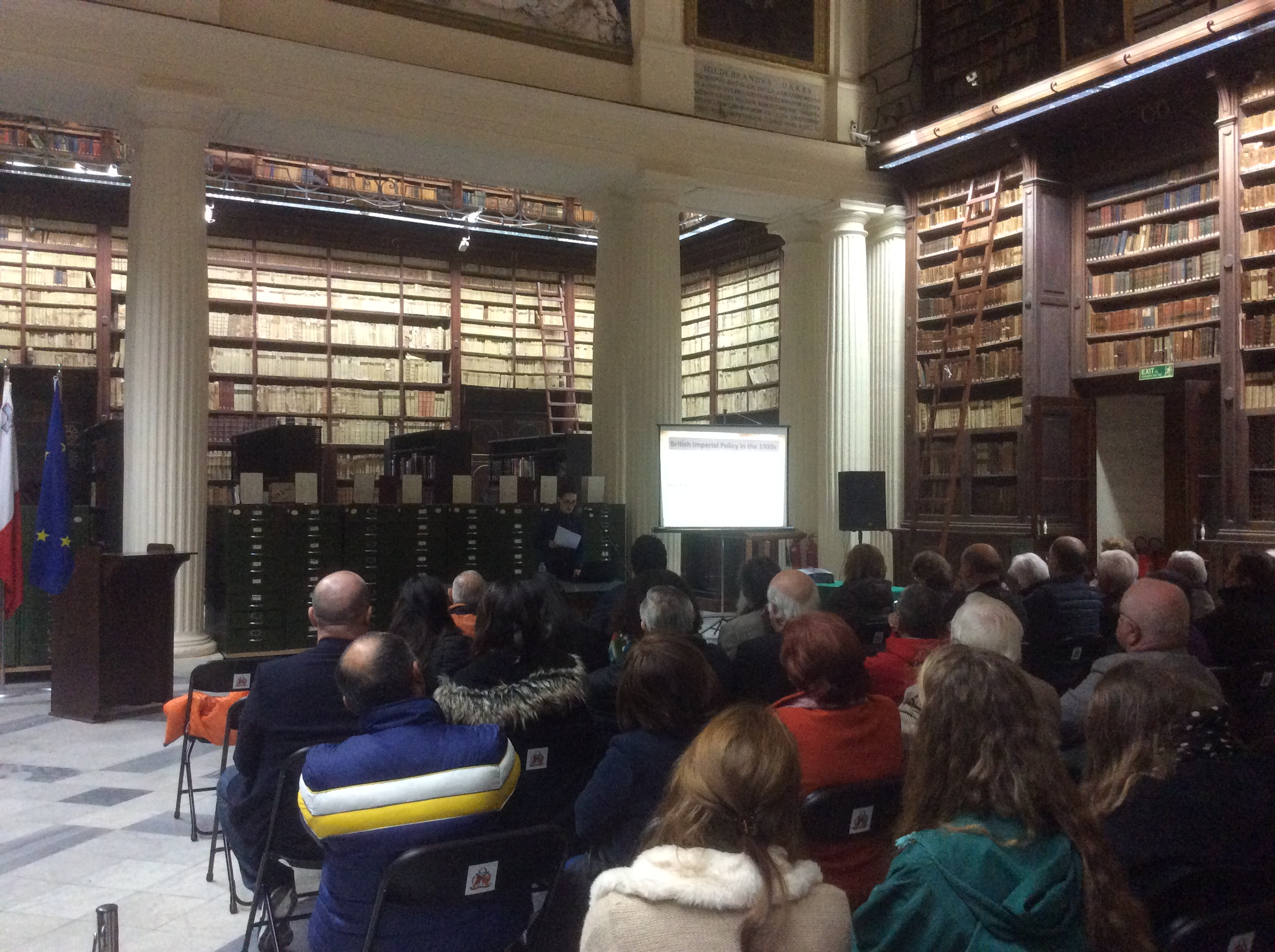
Public lecture at the main hall

The library building was designed by the Polish-Italian architect Stefano Ittar, and it is an early example of neoclassical architecture in Malta. It has a symmetrical façade with Doric and Ionic columns. The first floor is supported on a loggia, with the main doorway in the centre. A balustraded balcony is located above the doorway, and it is supported by Doric and Ionic columns. The building is also well known for its neo-classic monumental staircase that spreads from the main entrance to the upper floors.

Evidence shows that while Stefano was the main architect, his son Sebastiano Ittar continued the design after his father died before finalizing the work.

The library building was included on the Antiquities List of 1925. It is now scheduled as a Grade 1 national monument, and it is also listed on the National Inventory of the Cultural Property of the Maltese Islands.

== Collections ==
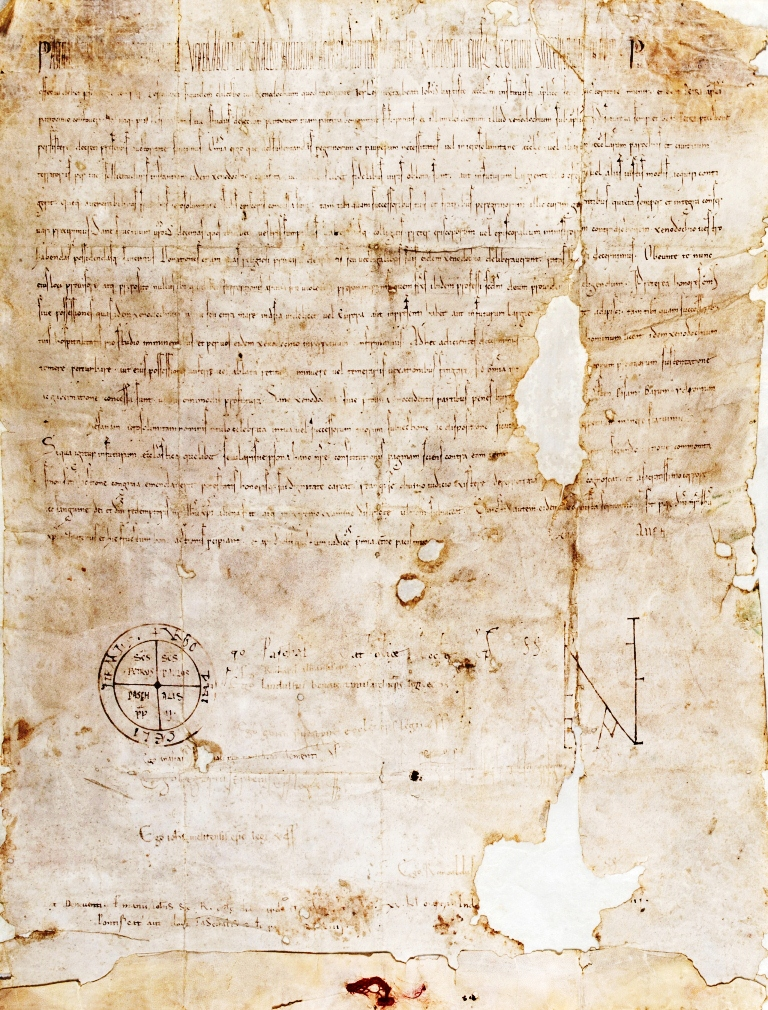
Pie Postulatio Voluntatis (1113)

The National Library of Malta's collections include:

- Pie Postulatio Voluntatis, a papal bull issued by Pope Paschal II in 1113 confirming the establishment of the Order of St. John
- the archives of the Order of St. John from the Middle Ages to 1798
- the archives of the Treasury of the Order
- the archives of the Università of Mdina and that of Valletta from 1450 to 1818
- 1617 codices and manuscripts
- 60 incunabula, including Quintilian's Institutiones Oratoriæ (1476), Caoursin's Obsidionis Rhodiae urbis descriptio (1480) and Rhodiorum Historia (1496), Ptolemy's Cosmographia (1490), the Privilegia Ordinis Sancti Joannis Hierosolymitani a Summis Pont. concessa (1495) and Plautus' Comœdiæ (1499)
- a large collection of Melitensia (books, pamphlets, newspapers etc. by Maltese authors or related to Malta), including some of the earliest newspapers published in Malta (such as the Journal de Malte, Foglio d'Avvisi, L'Argo, Il Cartaginese and Giornale di Malta)
- maps dating from the 16th to the 20th centuries, including maps of local roads, fortifications and archaeological sites
- a collection of fine bindings, including volumes made for King Louis XV of France and later donated to de Tencin
