= Le Moniteur Universel =

French newspaper and official journal (1789–1868)

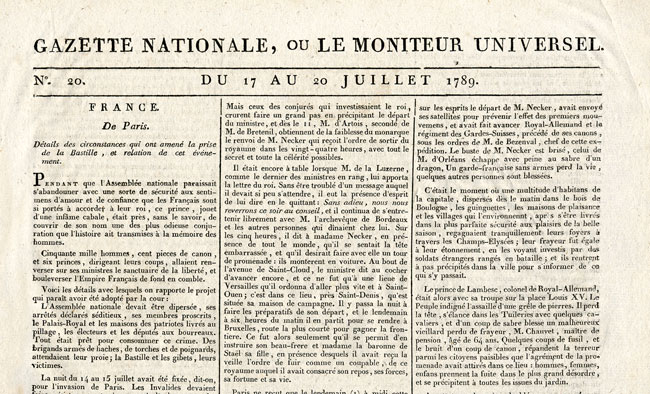
- Type: Daily newspaper
- Format: Berliner
- Owner: Charles-Joseph Panckoucke
- Founded: November 24, 1789
- Ceased publication: December 31, 1868 (official part); June 30, 1901 (in general)
- Headquarters: Paris, France

Le Moniteur Universel (French pronunciation: [lə mɔnitœʁ ynivɛʁsɛl]) was a French newspaper founded in Paris on November 24, 1789, under the title Gazette Nationale ou Le Moniteur Universel by Charles-Joseph Panckoucke, and which ceased publication on December 31, 1868. It was the main French newspaper during the French Revolution and was for a long time the official journal of the French government and at times a propaganda publication, especially under the Napoleonic regime. Le Moniteur had a large circulation in France and Europe, and also in America during the French Revolution.

== History ==
The interest aroused by the debates of the first National Assembly suggested to Hugues-Bernard Maret the idea of publishing them in the Bulletin de l'Assemblée. Charles-Joseph Panckoucke (1736–1798), owner of the Mercure de France and publisher of the famous Encyclopédie of 1785, persuaded him to merge this into a larger paper, the Gazette Nationale ou Le Moniteur Universel.

On December 2, 1799 Le Moniteur was declared an official newspaper. Napoleon controlled it via Hugues-Bernard Maret and Jean Jacques Régis de Cambacérès, who were responsible for its content. Due to Napoleon's strict controls of the press, the Moniteur's reports of legislative debates were replaced by bulletins of the Grand Army and polemical articles directed against England.

The words Gazette Nationale were dropped from the newspaper's name on January 1, 1811, when it became Le Moniteur Universel. The newspaper also became less exclusively political, articles on literature, science, and art occupying a considerable portion of its columns.

Napoleon's return from exile on Elba on March 20, 1815, confirmed Le Moniteur in its position as official journal; Le Moniteur announced in the same edition both the departure of King Louis XVIII and the arrival of the Emperor in the Tuileries. Following the Second Restoration, the Moniteur temporarily lost its official function to a new government-issued Gazette officielle (ISSN 0766-7205), published between 14 July 1815 and 27 January 1816 (81 issues). It nonetheless kept publishing government documents, reprinted from the official gazette. It reassumed its role on 1 February 1816, with a new layout split between an “Official part”, for laws and regulations, and a “Non-official part”.

Immediately after the July Revolution of 1830, one of the first steps of the provisional government was to seize control of Le Moniteur and the government of Louis Philippe I put it under the control of the ministerial departments.

Le Moniteur ceased the publication of the official part after a conflict with Napoleon III on December 31, 1868, being superseded as the official journal of the French Empire (and later the French Republic) by what is known now as the Journal Officiel de la République Française. A decree of November 5, 1870 gave the new journal the monopoly to publish laws and regulations. De facto deprived of its official function, Le Moniteur Universel continued to exist as an independent, tendentially conservative newspaper until June 30, 1901.

== See also ==
- History of French newspapers

== General and cited references ==
- Popkin, Jeremy D. (1990). Revolutionary News: The Press in France, 1789–1799. Bicentennial Reflections on the French Revolution. Durham, NC: Duke University Press. ISBN 0-8223-0997-1. OCLC 20593736.
