= Il Cartaginese =

Newspaper

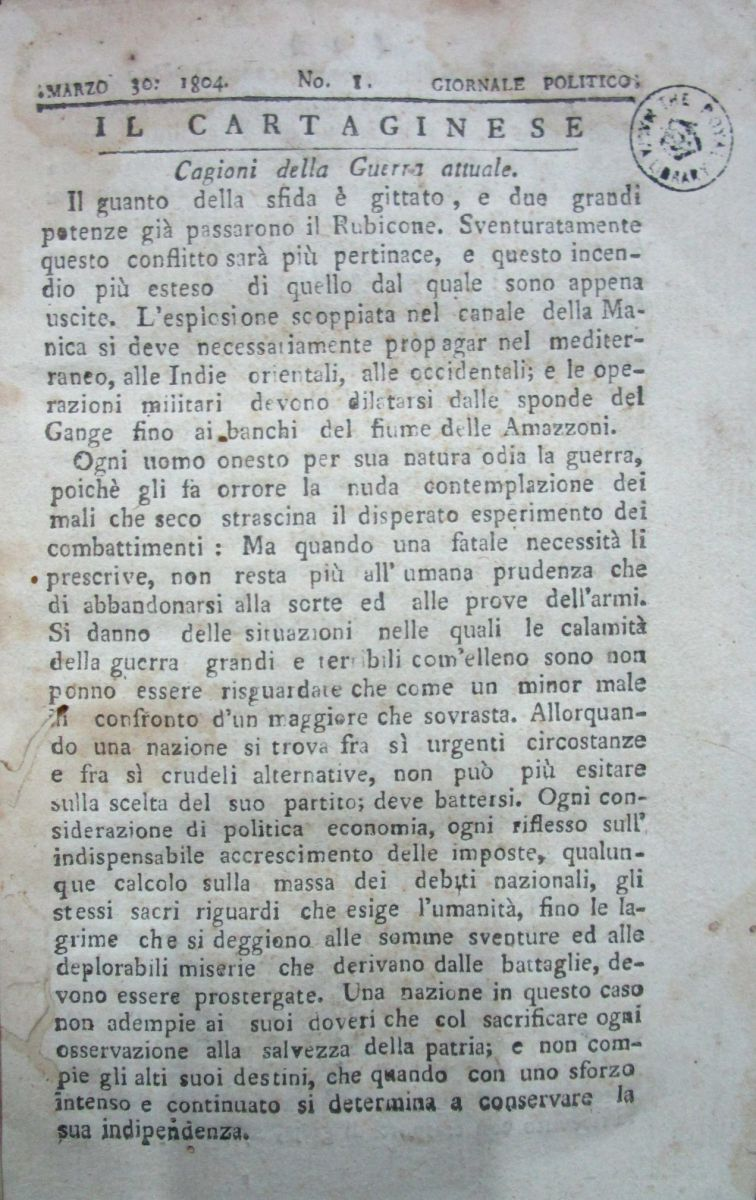
First edition of Il Cartaginese, dated 30 March 1804

Il Cartaginese was a newspaper published in the British protectorate of Malta between 1804 and 1805. At the time of its issue, it was the only periodical publication in Malta. Il Cartaginese was preceded by L'Argo (1804) and it was succeeded by the Giornale di Malta (1812–1813).

The newspaper was edited by Vittorio Barzoni and Gavino Bonavita, and it focused on foreign news. Its publication was controlled by the government, and it contained anti-French propaganda. The newspaper was usually eight pages long and it sometimes had a supplement. A total of 15 issues were made, each having a circulation of between 400 and 1000 copies. The newspaper was not successful, possibly due to poor literacy levels.

Copies of the publication are now preserved at the National Library of Malta.
