= Courier de l'Égypte =

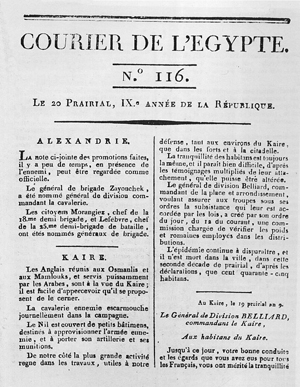
Courier de l'Égypte number 116

The Courier de l'Égypte (Note: Issues 9, 10 and 12–17 were titled Courrier de l'Égypte.) (English: "Courier of Egypt") was a newspaper published during the French invasion of Egypt and Syria. Existing primarily to propagate French propaganda regarding the invasion, the newspaper reported on French military operations in the region along with publishing "travel stories of [the] many correspondents wandering around Cairo on the lookout for a picturesque scene".

== History ==
Its first issue was published on 29 August 1798, edited by Joseph Fourier, one of the savants (scientists, engineers, artists and botanists) brought along by Napoleon for the invasion. Many of these savants made up the Institut d'Egypte (Institute of Egypt), from which most of the contributions to the Courier de l'Égypte were made. The paper had a four-page and two-column format and was published irregularly.

The last issue of Courier de l'Égypte was published on 9 June 1801, just two and a half months before the end of the campaign. During its lifetime Courier de l'Égypte produced a total of 116 issues.

== See also ==
- Journal de Malte, a similar publication in French-occupied Malta
