= Journal de Malte =

Newspaper from Malta

- Liberté | Égalité
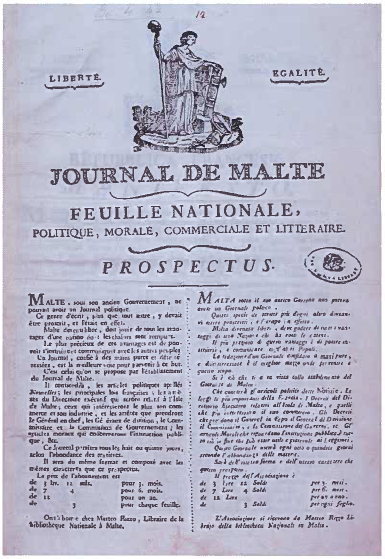
- Prospectus of the Journal de Malte at the National Library of Malta
- Format: Quarto-sized newspaper
- Editor: Michel-Louis-Étienne Regnaud de Saint-Jean d'Angély
- Founded: 14 July 1798
- Ceased publication: 26 September 1798
- Political alignment: French republicanism
- Language: French and Italian
- Headquarters: Valletta, French-occupied Malta
- Circulation: 500 copies

The Journal de Malte was Malta's first newspaper, and it was published between July and September 1798 during the French occupation of Malta. Written in French and Italian, a total of ten issues of the newspaper are believed to have been published, although only seven seem to still survive today and it is unclear if the other three are lost or if they were ever actually published at all.

== Publication history ==
On 27 June 1798, shortly after the French invasion and occupation of Malta, Claude-Henri Belgrand de Vaubois approved a request which theoretically allowed freedom of the press in the islands. Despite this, the government retained full control over any publications.

The first issue of the Journal de Malte is believed to have been published on 14 July 1798, and it was the first newspaper ever published in the Maltese Islands. A prospectus for another newspaper entitled Malta Libera also exists, but no copies of this publication are known and it has been speculated that Malta Libera might have been the original planned name for the Journal de Malte, but the name was changed before the first issue was published. On 28 July, Jean de Bosredon de Ransijat wrote to Napoleon that the aim of the journal was "to fulfil the dual purpose of praising with dignity [Napoleon's] further and glorious enterprises, and to enlighten the Maltese about the advantages of their union with France." The newspaper's editor was Michel-Louis-Étienne Regnaud de Saint-Jean d'Angély.

The newspaper was short-lived and publication stopped in September after a rebellion against French occupation broke out among the Maltese population.

== Format and content ==
The Journal de Malte was bilingual, and each page was divided into two columns with French text on the left and Italian on the right. The paper was headed by the motto Liberté, Égalité, and its full title was Journal de Malte. Feuille Nationale, Politique, Morale, Commerciale et Litteraire. (French for "Journal of Malta. National, Political, Moral, Commercial and Literary Folio.").

The newspaper was a form of propaganda, and it was aimed at boosting the morale of the French garrison as well as indoctrinating the small portion of the Maltese population which was literate. The first page of the Journal contained news, and this was followed by instructions and texts by Vaubois and Saint-Jeun d'Angély. It included speeches and editorials which supported the French occupation, and one issue included a pastoral letter by bishop Vincenzo Labini.

== Distribution ==
The print run of the Journal was set at 500 copies in August 1798, and efforts were made to distribute the paper in both the urban area around the Grand Harbour (consisting of the capital Valletta, Floriana and the Three Cities) as well as the rural towns and villages. Subscriptions to the newspaper were payable to Matteo Rizzo, the librarian of the Bibliotheca Publica.

== Issues and surviving copies ==
It is believed that 10 issues of the Journal were published between July and September 1798, with the dates of issue according to a 19th-century source being as follows:

- Issue 1 – 14 July 1798
- Issue 2 – 24 July 1798
- Issue 3 – 9 August 1798
- Issue 4 – 12 August 1798
- Issue 5 – 15 August 1798
- Issue 6 – 18 August 1798
- Issue 7 – 20 August 1798
- Issue 8 – 27 August 1798
- Issue 9 – 28 August 1798
- Issue 10 – 26 September 1798

One source from 1916 stated that there were actually 12 issues, but this claim seems to be unsubstantiated.

Seven issues of the newspaper are preserved at the National Library of Malta, with the three that are missing being issues 2, 5 and 9. Two pages from the copy of issue 10 preserved at the library are also missing. The seven surviving issues have consecutive page numbers, so it is possible that issues 2, 5 and 9 were never actually published.

Four issues of the Journal (issues 1, 3, 4 and 10) are also preserved at the Bibliothèque nationale de France in Paris.

== Legacy ==
Despite being short-lived, the Journal de Malte had a significant impact since it was the first newspaper ever published in Malta. The Maltese word ġurnal (meaning "newspaper") is believed to be derived from the name of this publication. It is also regarded as the predecessor of the Malta Government Gazette, which was first published by the British colonial authorities in 1813 and continues to be published by the Government of Malta today.

== See also ==
- Courrier de l'Égypte, a similar publication in French-occupied Egypt
