= Daily Malta Chronicle and Garrison Gazette =

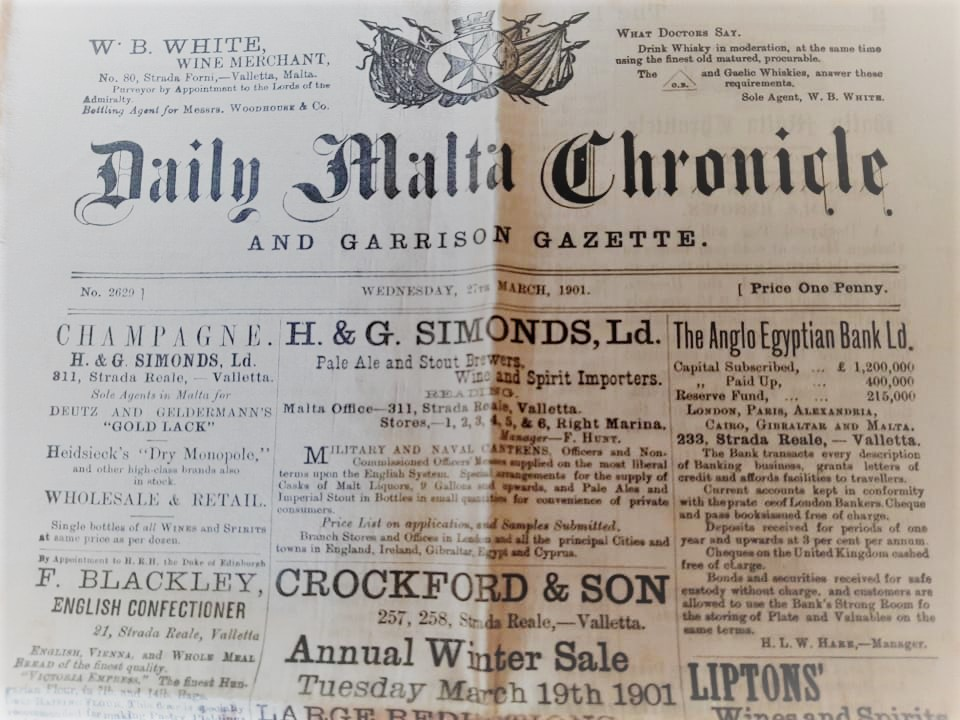
- 27 March 1901 frontpage
- Type: Weekly, later daily newspaper
- Founded: 1884
- Political alignment: pro-British (since 1901)
- Language: English
- Ceased publication: June 1940
- Country: Malta

The Daily Malta Chronicle and Garrison Gazette was an English-language daily newspaper in Malta, first issued on 14 November 1884, and running till June 1940.

== History ==
Originally a weekly newspaper intended as a general paper for British servicemen stationed in Malta, it later began to be issued daily. It took on a political stance after 1901, when it began to publish pro-British and imperialist contributions by Gerald Strickland.

Its issue no. 1510, published on 26 June 1897 and price three pence, was printed on silk, commemorating the Diamond Jubilee of Queen Victoria and reporting a day-by-day account of the local celebratory events, extending from Saturday to Tuesday, 19 to 22 June.

== See also ==
- Times of Malta
