= L'Argo =

L'Argo was a newspaper published in the British protectorate of Malta in 1804. At the time of its issue, it was the only periodical publication in Malta. L'Argo was preceded by Foglio d'Avvisi (1803–1804) and it was succeeded by Il Cartaginese (1804–1805).

The newspaper was edited by Vittorio Barzoni and Gavino Bonavita, and it focused on foreign news. Its publication was controlled by the government, and it contained anti-French propaganda. A total of nine issues were published until September 1804, and circulation of the last two editions of the newspaper was 400 copies each. Each copy of the newspaper cost 12 grani.

Copies of the publication are now preserved at the National Library of Malta.
