= List of book publishing houses in India =

This list gives you short details about publication houses in India

== India publishing houses ==
- A. H. Wheeler
- ABP Group
- Aleph Book Company
- Asam Sahitya Sabha
- Asian Educational Services
- B. Jain
- Balbharati
- Bangiya Sahitya Parishat
- Bharatiya Jnanpith
- Bharatiya Vidya Bhavan
- Bhatkal and Sen
- B.K Publications Private Limited
- Booksthakam Publishers
- Calcutta School-Book Society
- Chhattisgarh Text Book Corporation
- Children's Book Trust
- DC Books
- Desanthiri
- Gita Press
- Gujarat Sahitya Akademi
- Gujarat Sahitya Sabha
- Gujarati Sahitya Parishad
- Hachette India
- HarperCollins India
- Higginbotham's
- Hindi Granth Karyalay
- Hindustani Academy
- India Book House
- Indian Express Limited
- Indian Thought Publications
- Jaico Publishing House
- Jaypee Brothers
- Juggernaut Books
- Karadi Tales
- Katha Books
- Kathashilpa Publishing House
- Kerala Books and Publications Society
- LeftWord Books
- Living Media India
- Mango Books
- Manipuri Sahitya Parishad
- Manjul Publishing House
- Motilal Banarsidass
- Muktadhara
- Munshiram Manoharlal
- Nagari Pracharini Sabha
- National Book Trust
- Navayana
- Nawal Kishore Press
- Notion Press
- Orient Blackswan
- Orient Paperback
- Open House Publishing
- Oswaal Books
- Penguin India
- Permanent Black
- Pilgrims Book House
- Popular Prakashan
- Prabhat Prakashan
- Publications Division
- Purushottam Publishers
- Pustak Mahal
- Rajkamal Prakashan
- Rajpal & Sons
- Ratna Sagar – Indian educational publishing company established in 1982.
- Rifah-e-Aam Press
- Roli Books
- Rupa Publications
- S. Chand Group
- Sadou Asom Lekhika Samaroh Samiti
- Sahithya Pravarthaka Co-operative Society
- Sahitya Akademi
- Sapna Book House
- Seagull Books
- Serampore Mission Press
- Signet Press
- Speaking Tiger Books
- Sri Venkateswar Steam Press
- State Institute of Encyclopaedic Publications
- Thacker, Spink & Company
- The Indian Press
- Tulika Books
- Tulika Publishers
- University Granth Nirman Board
- Vani Prakashan
- Vavilla Ramaswamy Sastrulu and Sons
- Vikas Publishing
- Voice of India
- Westland Books
- Writers Workshop (publisher)
- Yoda Press
- Zubaan Books
