= Item bank =

An item bank or question bank is a repository of test items that belong to a testing program, as well as all information pertaining to those items. In most applications of testing and assessment, the items are of multiple choice format, but any format can be used. Items are pulled from the bank and assigned to test forms for publication either as a paper-and-pencil test or some form of e-assessment.

== Types of information ==
An item bank will not only include the text of each item, but also extensive information regarding test development and psychometric characteristics of the items. Examples of such information include:

- Item author
- Date written
- Item status (e.g., new, pilot, active, retired)
- Angoff ratings
- Correct answer
- Item format
- Classical test theory statistics
- Item response theory statistics
- Linkage to test blueprint
- Item history (e.g., usage date(s) and reviews)
- User-defined fields

== Item banking software ==
Because an item bank is essentially a simple database, it can be stored in database software or even a spreadsheet such as Microsoft Excel. However, there are several dozen commercially available software programs specifically designed for item banking. The advantages that these provide are related to assessment. For example, items are presented on the computer screen as they would appear to a test examinee, and item response theory parameters can be translated into item response functions or information functions. Additionally, there are functionalities for publication, such as formatting a set of items to be printed as a paper-and-pencil test.

Some item banks also have test administration functionalities, such as being able to deliver e-assessment or process "bubble" answer sheets.

== Examples ==
In India the popular question bank is Oswaal Question Bank which covers all Indian board and competitive exam such as CBSE, CISCE, Pre-university course- State board and JEE, NEET, CLAT and CUET.
