= Raja Rammohun Roy National Agency for ISBN =

Government Agency run under Government of India

Raja Rammohun Roy National Agency for ISBN is an Indian government agency which is the only ISBN agency which run under Ministry of Education, Government of India. It was founded in January 1985 to facilitate authors and publishers to register for ISBN in India. It gives free ISBN to Indian citizens.

The agency is named for writer and social reformer Raja Ram Mohan Roy, whose work influenced modern day Indian government structure and policy.

== Online verification and authentication of ISBN numbers ==
ISBN issued by the agency can be verified on its website. There is also an old portal link for checking ISBN allotted before the revamping of the current website.

== See also ==
- Book publishing in India
