= Raja Ram Mohan Roy =

Indian reformer and writer (1772–1833)

Raja Ram Mohan Roy FRAS
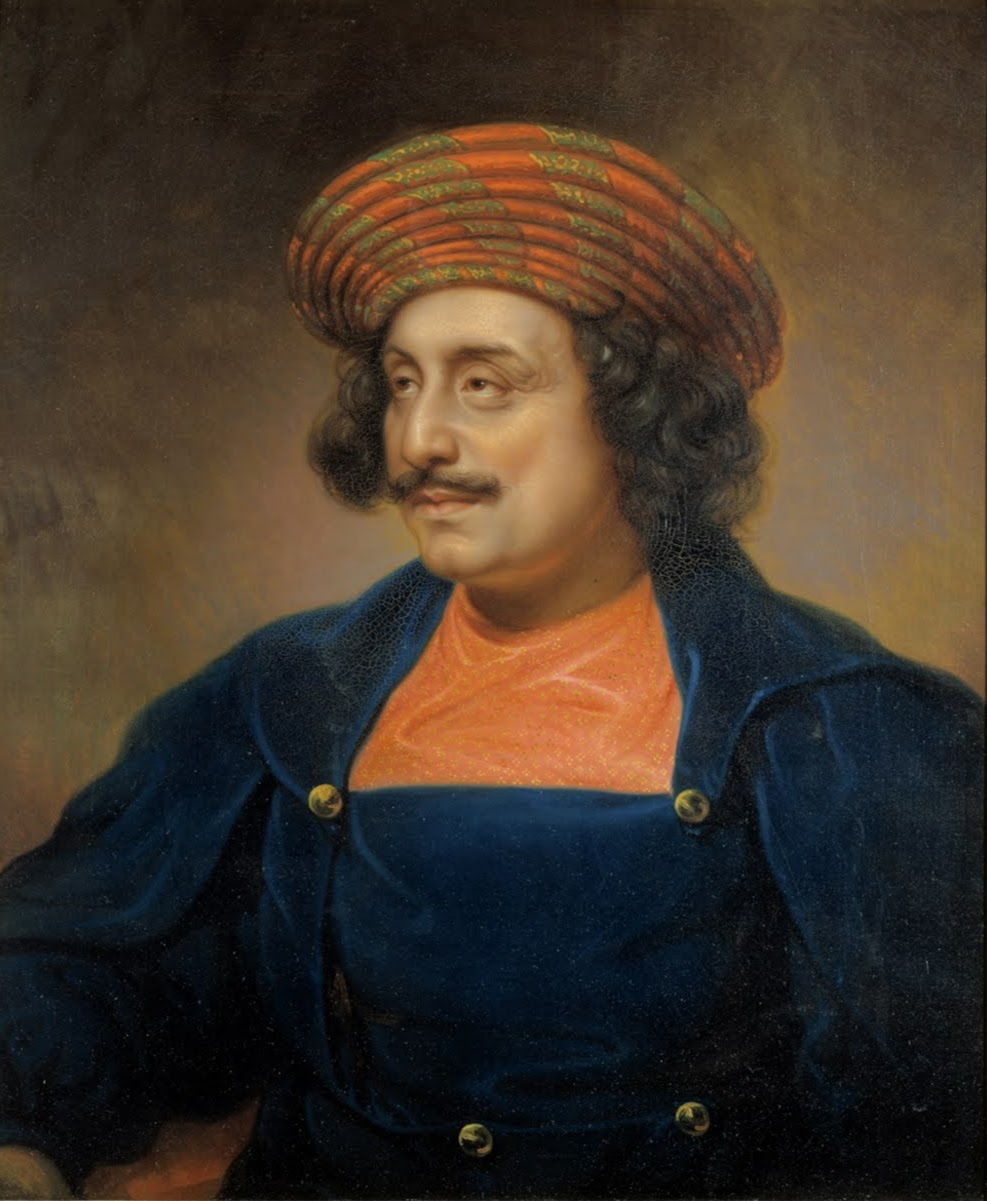
- Roy in London (1833), half portrait by Rembrandt Peale
- Pronunciation: [ram moɦɔn rae̯]
- Born: c. 22 May 1772; Radhanagar, Bengal Presidency, India
- Died: 27 September 1833 (aged 61); Stapleton, Bristol, England
- Other name: Father of Indian Renaissance
- Occupations: Social and religious reformer, author
- Known for: Bengal Renaissance, Brahmo Sabha (social, political reforms)
- Children: Radhaprasad Roy, Ramaprasad Roy

Raja Ram Mohan Roy (Note: Bengali pronunciation: [ram moɦɔn rae̯].) (Bengali pronunciation: [ram moɦɔn rae̯]; 22 May 1772 – 27 September 1833) was an Indian social reformer and writer who was one of the founders of the Brahmo Sabha in 1828, the precursor of the Brahmo Samaj, a socio-religious reform movement in the Indian subcontinent. He has been dubbed the "Father of the Indian Renaissance." He was given the title of Raja by Mughal emperor Akbar II (r. 1806–1837).

His influence was apparent in the fields of politics, public administration, education, and religion. He was known for his efforts to abolish the practices of sati and child marriage. Roy wrote Gaudiya Vyakaran, which was the first complete Bangla grammar written book.

== Early life (1772–1796) ==
Ram Mohan Roy was born in Radhanagar, Hooghly District, Bengal Presidency. His great-grandfather Krishnakanta Bandyopadhyay was a Rarhi Kulin (noble) Brahmin. Among Kulin Brahmins – descendants of the five families of Brahmins, migrated from Kannauj by Ballal Sen in the 12th century as per popular myth – those from the Rarhi district of West Bengal were notorious in the 19th century for living off dowries by marrying several women. Kulinism was a synonym for polygamy and the dowry system, both of which Ram Mohan campaigned against. His father, Ramkanta, was a Vaishnavite, while his mother, Tarini Devi, was from a Shaivite family. He was a great scholar of Sanskrit, Persian and English languages and also knew Arabic, Latin and Greek. One parent prepared him for the occupation of a scholar, the Shastri, while the other secured for him all the worldly advantages needed to launch a career in the laukik or worldly sphere of public administration. Torn between these two parental ideals from early childhood, Ram Mohan vacillated between the two for the rest of his life.

During his childhood Ram Mohan Roy witnessed the death of his sister-in-law through sati. The seventeen-year-old girl was dragged towards the pyre where Ram Mohan Roy witnessed her terrified state. He tried to protest but to no avail. She was burned alive. The people chanted "Maha Sati! Maha Sati! Maha Sati!" (great wife) over her painful screams.

Ram Mohan Roy was married three times. His first wife died early. He had two sons, Radhaprasad in 1800, and Ramaprasad in 1812 with his second wife, who died in 1824. Roy's third wife outlived him.

The nature and content of Ram Mohan Roy's early education is disputed. One view is that Ram Mohan started his formal education in the village pathshala where he learned Bengali and some Sanskrit and Persian. Later he is said to have studied Persian and Arabic in a madrasa in Patna and after that he was sent to Benares to learn the intricacies of Sanskrit and Hindu scripture, including the Vedas and Upanishads. The dates of his time in both these places are uncertain. However, it is believed that he was sent to Patna when he was nine years old and two years later he went to Benares.

Ram Mohan Roy's impact on modern Indian history was his revival of the pure and ethical principles of the Vedanta school of philosophy as found in the Upanishads. He preached the unity of God, made early translations of Vedic scriptures into English, co-founded the Calcutta Unitarian Society and founded the Brahmo Sabha, precursor to Brahmo Samaj. The Brahmo Samaj played a major role in reforming and modernising the Indian society. He successfully campaigned against sati, the practice of burning widows on their husband's funeral pyre. He sought to integrate Western culture with the best features of his own country's traditions. He established a number of schools to popularise a modern system of education in India. He promoted a rational, ethical, non-authoritarian, this-worldly views and social reforms in Hinduism. His writings also sparked interest among British and American Unitarians.

== Christianity and the early rule of the East India Company (1795–1828) ==
In 1797, Raja Ram Mohan reached Calcutta and became a bania (moneylender), mainly to lend to the Englishmen of the Company living beyond their means. Ram Mohan also continued his vocation as pandit in the English courts and started to make a living for himself. He began learning Greek and Latin.

In 1799, Carey was joined by missionary Joshua Marshman and the printer William Ward at the Danish settlement of Serampore.

From 1803 until 1815, Ram Mohan served the East India Company's "Writing Service", commencing as private clerk (Munshi) to Thomas Woodroffe, Registrar of the Appellate Court at Murshidabad (whose distant nephew, John Woodroffe—also a magistrate—and later lived off the Maha Nirvana Tantra under the pseudonym Arthur Avalon). Roy resigned from Woodroffe's service and later secured employment with John Digby, a Company collector, and Ram Mohan spent many years at Rangpur and elsewhere with Digby, where he renewed his contacts with Hariharananda. William Carey had by this time settled at Serampore and the old trio renewed their profitable association. William Carey was also aligned now with the English Company, then head-quartered at Fort William, and his religious and political ambitions were increasingly intertwined.

While in Murshidabad, in 1804 Roy wrote Tuhfat-ul-Muwahhidin (A Gift to Monotheists) in Persian with an introduction in Arabic. Bengali had not yet become the language of intellectual discourse. The importance of Tuhfat-ul-muwahhidin lies only in its being the first known theological statement of one who achieved later fame and notoriety as a Vedantin. His biographer Bruce Carlisle Robinson finds this work unremarkable, perhaps of interest only to a social historian because of its amateurish eclecticism. Roy did not know the Upanishads at this stage in his intellectual development. Tuhfat became available in 1884 in the English translation of Maulavi Obaidullah EI Obaid, published by the Adi Brahmo Samaj.

In 1814, he started Atmiya Sabha (i.e. Society of Friends) a philosophical discussion circle in Kolkata (then Calcutta) to propagate the monotheistic ideals of the vedanta and to campaign against idolatry, caste rigidities, meaningless rituals and other social ills.

The East India Company was draining money from India at a rate of three million pounds a year by 1838. Ram Mohan Roy was one of the first to try to estimate how much money was being taken out of India and to where it was disappearing. He estimated that around one-half of all total revenue collected in India was sent out to England, leaving India, with a considerably larger population, to use the remaining money to maintain social well-being. Ram Mohan Roy saw this and believed that the unrestricted settlement of Europeans in India governing under free trade would help ease the economic drain crisis.

During the next two decades, Ram Mohan along with William Carey, launched his attack against the bastions of Hinduism of Bengal, namely his own Kulin Brahmin priestly clan (then in control of the many temples of Bengal) and their priestly excesses. The Kulin excesses targeted include sati (the co-cremation of widows), polygamy, child marriage and dowry.

From 1819, Ram Mohan's battery increasingly turned against William Carey, a Baptist Missionary settled in Serampore, and the Serampore missionaries. With Dwarkanath's munificence, he launched a series of attacks against Trinitarian Christianity and was now considerably assisted in his theological debates by the Unitarian faction of Christianity.

He wrote Gaudiya Vyakaran which was the first complete Bangla grammar written book. It was published in 1826.

In 1828, he launched Brahmo Sabha with Debendranath Tagore. By 1828, he had become a well known figure in India. In 1830, he had gone to England as an envoy of the Mughal Emperor, Akbar Shah II, who invested him with the title of Raja to the court of King William IV.

== Middle "Brahmo" period (1820–1830) ==
This was Ram Mohan's most controversial period. Commenting on his published works Sivanath Sastri writes:

"The period between 1820 and 1830 was also eventful from a literary point of view, as will be manifest from the following list of his publications during that period:

- Second Appeal to the Christian Public, Brahmanical Magazine – Parts I, II and III, with Bengali translation and a new Bengali newspaper called Sambad Kaumudi in 1821;
- A Persian paper called Mirat-ul-Akbar contained a tract entitled Brief Remarks on Ancient Female Rights and a book in Bengali called Answers to Four Questions in 1822;
- Third and final appeal to the Christian public, a memorial to the King of England on the subject of the liberty of the press, Ramdoss papers relating to Christian controversy, Brahmanical Magazine, No. IV, letter to Lord Arnherst on the subject of English education, a tract called "Humble Suggestions" and a book in Bengali called "Pathyapradan or Medicine for the Sick," all in 1823;
- A letter to Rev. H. Ware on the "Prospects of Christianity in India" and an "Appeal for Famine-smitten Natives in Southern India" in 1824;
- A tract on the different modes of worship, in 1825;
- A Bengali tract on the qualifications of a God-loving householder, a tract in Bengali on a controversy with a Kayastha and a grammar of the Bengali language in English in 1826;
- A Sanskrit tract on "Divine Worship by Gayatri" with an English translation of the same, the edition of a Sanskrit treatise against caste and the previously noticed tract called "Answer of a Hindu to the Question &c." in 1827;
- A form of divine worship and a collection of hymns composed by him and his friends, in 1828;
- "Religious Instructions Founded on Sacred Authorities" in English and Sanskrit, a Bengali tract called "Anusthan", and a petition against sati, in 1829.

He publicly declared that he would emigrate from the British Empire if Parliament failed to pass the Reform Bill.

In 1830, Ram Mohan Roy travelled to the United Kingdom as an ambassador of the Mughal Empire to ensure that Lord William Bentinck's Bengal Sati Regulation, 1829 banning the practice of sati was not overturned. In addition, Roy petitioned the King to increase the Mughal Emperor's allowance and perquisites. He was successful in persuading the British government to increase the stipend of the Mughal Emperor by £30,000. While in England, he embarked on cultural exchanges, meeting with members of parliament and publishing books on Indian economics and law. Sophia Dobson Collet was his biographer at that time.

== Religious reforms ==
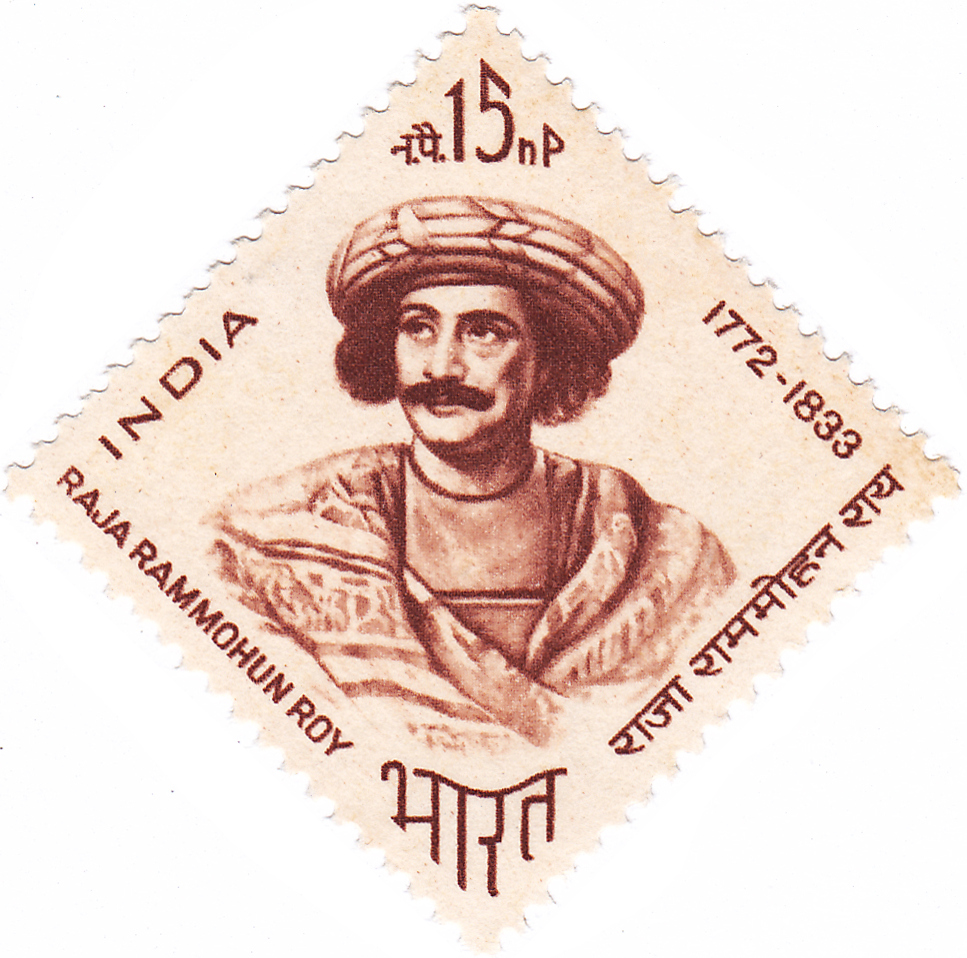
Ram Mohan Roy on a 1964 stamp of India.

The religious reforms of Roy contained in some beliefs of the Brahmo Samaj expounded by Rajnarayan Basu are:

- Brahmo Samaj believe that the most fundamental doctrines of Brahmoism are at the basis of every religion followed by a man.
- Brahmo Samaj believe in the existence of One Supreme God—"God, endowed with a distinct personality & moral attributes equal to His nature, and intelligence befitting the Author and Preserver of the Universe," and worship Him alone.
- Brahmo Samaj believe that worship of Him needs no fixed place or time. "We can adore Him at any time and at any place, provided that time and that place are calculated to compose and direct the mind towards Him."
- All men are children of the 'one God of all human beings', and therefore equal.

Having studied the Qur’an, the Vedas and the Upanishads, Roy's beliefs were derived from a combination of monastic elements of Hinduism, Islam, eighteenth-century Deism, Unitarianism, and the ideas of the Freemasons.

=== Social reforms ===
Raja Ram Mohan Roy founded the Atmiya Sabha and the Unitarian Community to fight the social evils, and to propagate social and educational reforms in India. He was the man who fought against superstitions, a pioneer in Indian education, and a trend setter in Bengali prose and Indian press.

- Crusaded against Hindu customs such as sati, polygamy, child marriage and the caste system.
- In 1828, he set up the Brahmo Sabha, a movement of reformist Bengali Brahmins to fight against social evils.

Roy's political background and Devandra's Christian influence helped shape his social and religious views regarding reforms of Hinduism. He writes,

The present system of Hindus is not well calculated to promote their political interests… It is necessary that some change should take place in their religion, at least for the sake of their political advantage and social comfort.

Roy's experience working with the British government taught him that Hindu traditions were often not credible or respected by western standards and this no doubt affected his religious reforms. He wanted to legitimise Hindu traditions to his European acquaintances by proving that "superstitious practices which deform the Hindu religion have nothing to do with the pure spirit it dictates!" The "superstitious practices", to which Ram Mohan Roy objected, included sati, caste rigidity, polygamy and child marriages. These practices were often the reasons British officials claimed moral superiority over the Indian nation. Ram Mohan Roy's ideas of religion actively sought to create a fair and just society by implementing humanitarian practices similar to the Christian ideals professed by the British and thus seeking to legitimise Hinduism in the eyes of the Christian world.

=== Educational reforms ===
- Roy believed education to be an implement for social reform.
- In 1822, Roy founded the Anglo-Hindu School, followed four years later (1826) by the Vedanta College; where he insisted that his teachings of monotheistic doctrines be incorporated with "modern, western curriculum."
- In 1830, he helped Rev. Alexander Duff in establishing the General Assembly's Institution (now known as Scottish Church College), by providing him with the venue vacated by Brahma Sabha and getting the first batch of students.
- He supported induction of Western learning into Indian education.
- He also set up the Vedanta College, offering courses as a synthesis of Western and Indian learning.
- His most popular journal was the Sambad Kaumudi. It covered topics like freedom of the press, induction of Indians into high ranks of service, and separation of the executive and judiciary.
- When the English East India Company muzzled the press, Ram Mohan composed two memorials against this in 1829 and 1830 respectively.

== Writings ==
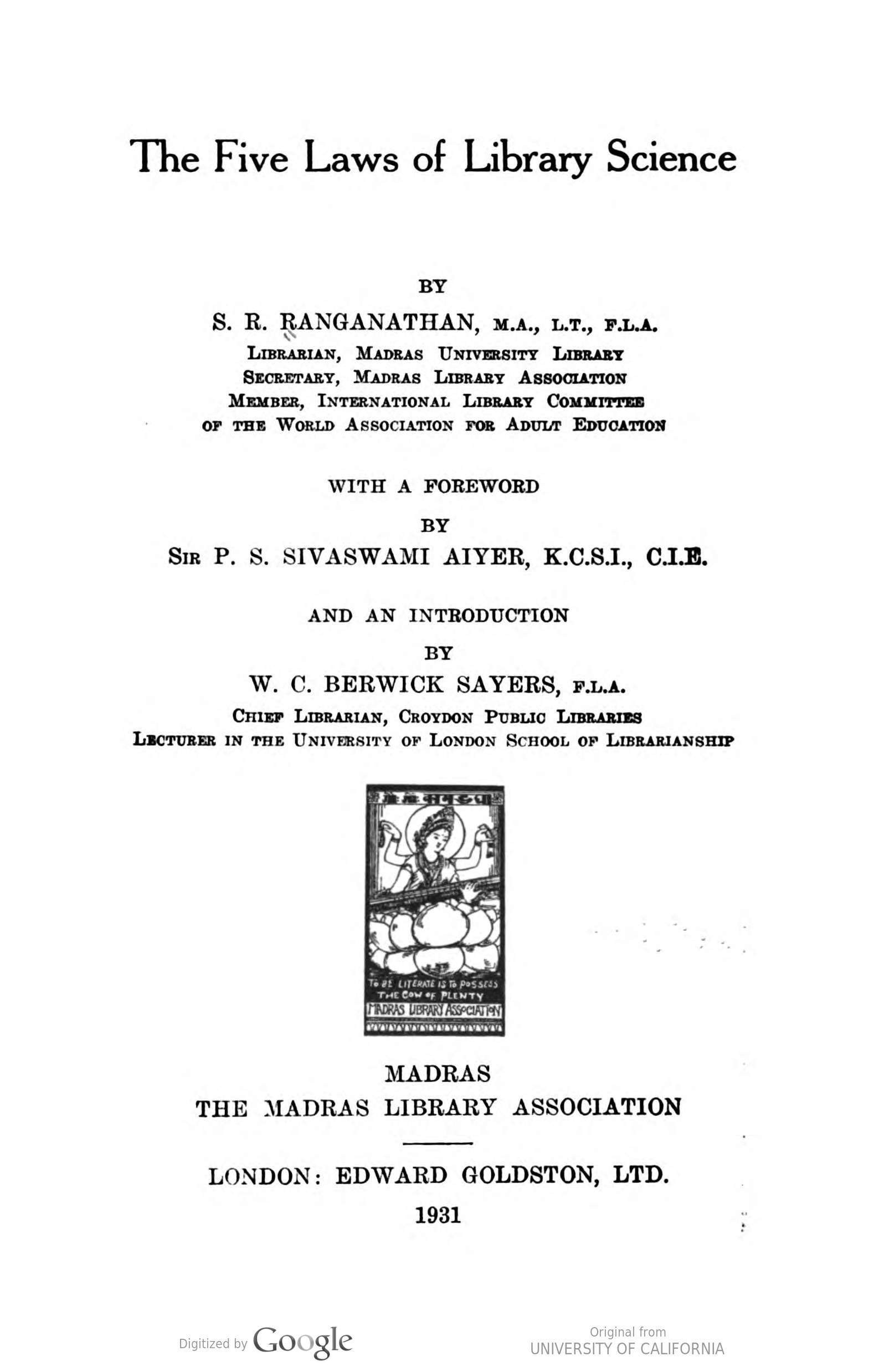
Five laws of library science, 1931

=== Literary works ===
- Vedanta Gantha: Published in 1815
- A Conference between the Advocate for, and an Opponent of Practice of Burning Widows Alive: Published in 1818 in Bengali and English
- A Defence of Hindu Theism: Published in 1820
- The Precepts of Jesus- The Guide to Peace and Happiness: Published in 1820
- Bengali Grammar: Published in 1826
- The Universal Religion: Published in 1829
- History of Indian Philosophy: Published in 1829

==== Newspapers ====
- Mirat-ul-Akhbar, a Persian-language journal
- Sambad Kaumudi, a Bengali weekly newspaper published in Kolkata in the first half of the 19th century

== Death ==
In early September 1833, Roy came to Bristol to visit his Unitarian friend, Lant Carpenter, where he made a deep impression on Lant's daughter and future social reformer, Mary Carpenter. While in Bristol, Roy preached at the Lewins Mead Meeting House. In mid-September, he became ill and was diagnosed with meningitis. He died at Stapleton, then a village to the north-east of Bristol (now a suburb), on 27 September 1833 of meningitis or a chronic respiratory ailment.

== Mausoleum at Arnos Vale ==
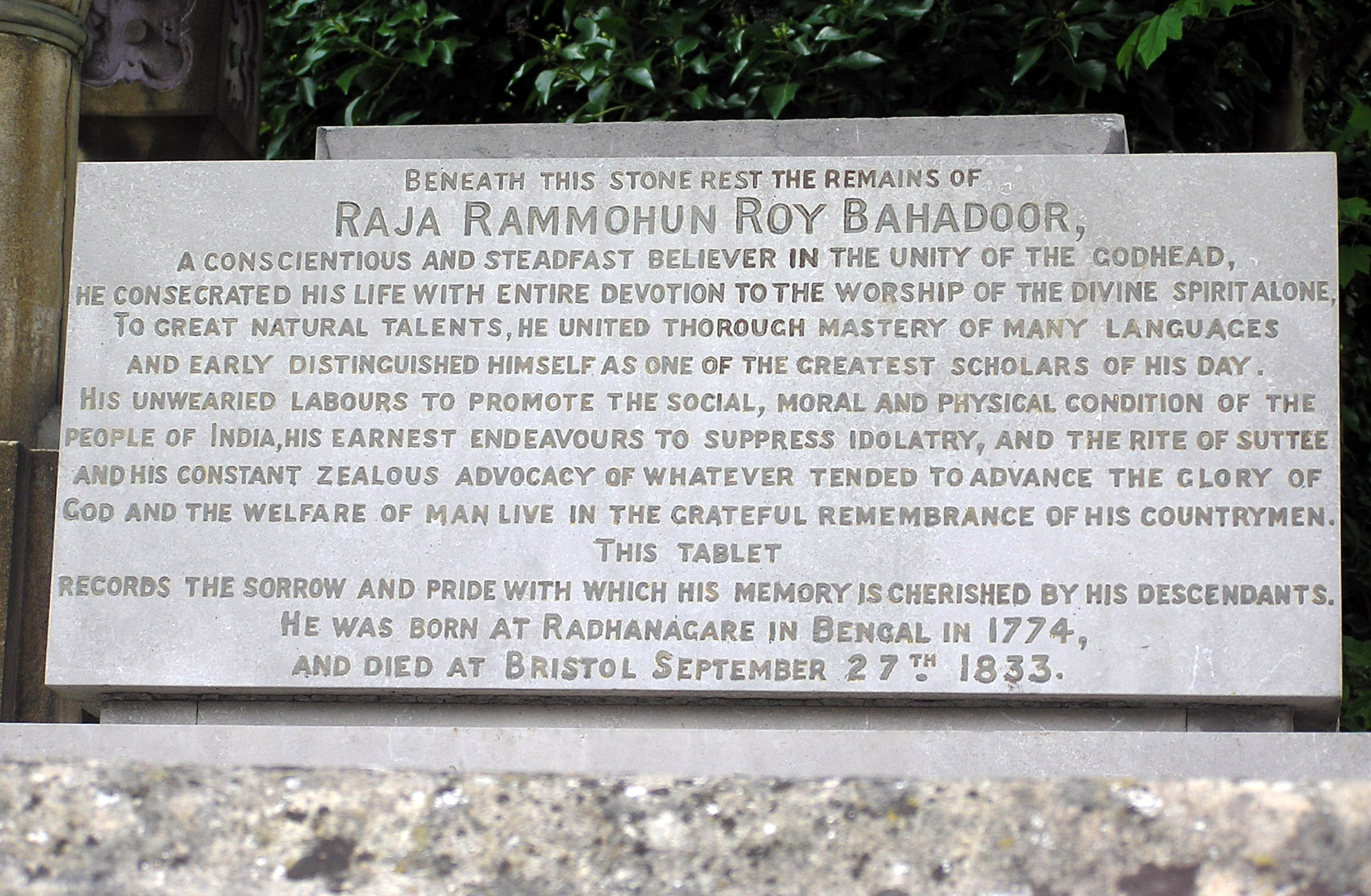
Epitaph for Ram Mohan Roy on his Mausoleum.

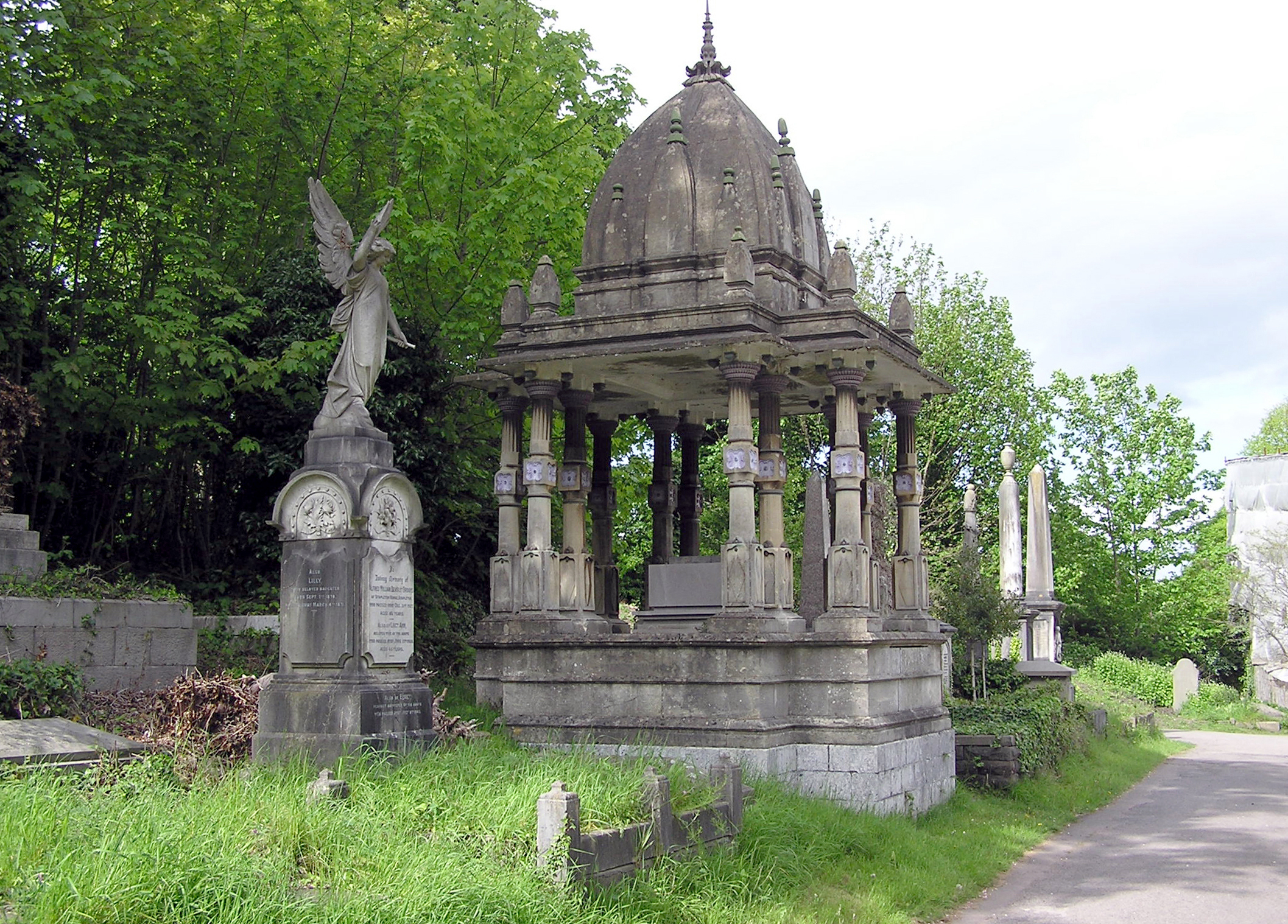
Mausoleum of Ram Mohan Roy in Arno's Vale Cemetery, Bristol, England.

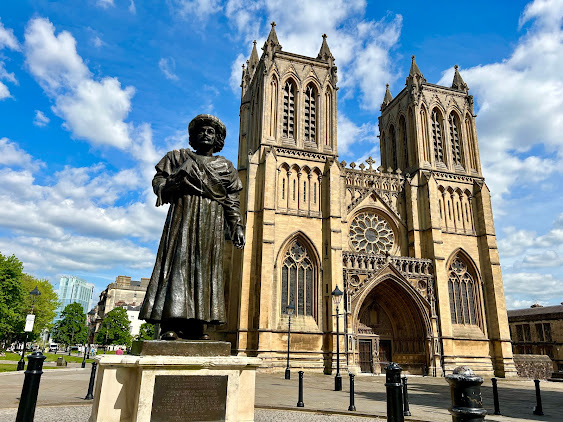
Statue of Ram Mohan Roy in Bristol

Ram Mohan Roy was originally buried on 18 October 1833, in the grounds of Stapleton Grove, where he had lived as an ambassador of the Mughal Empire and died of meningitis on 27 September 1833. Nine years later, he was reburied on 29 May 1843 in a grave at the new Arnos Vale Cemetery, in Brislington, East Bristol. William Carr and William Prinsep had bought a large plot on The Ceremonial Way there, and the body in its lac and a lead coffin was placed later in a deep brick-built vault, over seven feet underground. Two years after this, Dwarkanath Tagore helped pay for the chhatri raised above this vault, although there is no record of him ever visiting Bristol. The chhatri was designed by the artist William Prinsep, who had known Ram Mohan in Calcutta.

Bristol Arnos Vale cemetery have been holding remembrance services for Raja Ram Mohan Roy every year on a Sunday close to his death anniversary date of 27 September. The Indian High Commission at London often come to Raja's annual commemoration and Bristol's Lord Mayor is also regularly in attendance. The commemoration is a joint Brahmo-Unitarian service, in which, prayers and hymns are sung, flowers laid at the tomb, and the life of the Raja is celebrated via talks and visual presentations. In 2013, a recently discovered ivory bust of Ram Mohan was displayed. In 2014, his original death mask at Edinburgh was filmed and its history was discussed. In 2017, Raja's commemoration was held on 24 September.

== Legacy ==
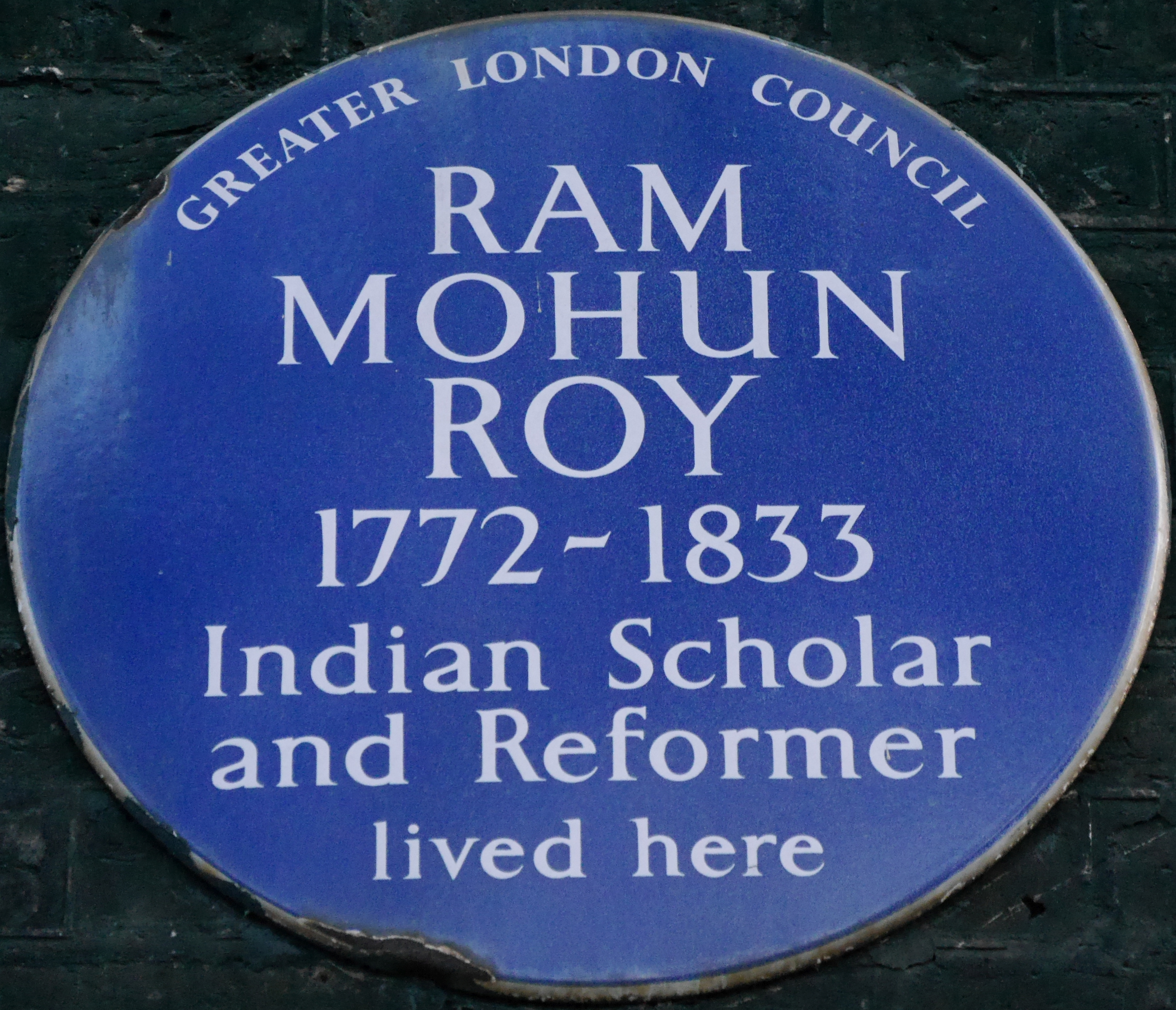
Blue Plaque issued by the Greater London Council on the wall of house at the 49 Bedford Square, where Roy lived during his days in the UK.

Roy's commitment to English education and thought sparked debate between Mahatma Gandhi and Rabindranath Tagore. Gandhi objected to Roy's devotion to English education and thought and disallowing independent thinking by being overly supportive of the Western philosophical discourses. Tagore wrote a letter rejecting Gandhi's view, saying "[Roy] had the full inheritance of Indian wisdom. He was never a school boy of the West, and therefore had the dignity to be a friend of the West."

In 1983, a full-scale Exhibition on Ram Mohan Roy was held in Bristol's Museum and Art Gallery. His enormous 1831 portrait by Henry Perronet Briggs still hangs there and was the subject of a talk by Max Muller in 1873. At Bristol's centre, on College Green, there is a full-size bronze statue of Raja by a modern Kolkata sculptor Niranjan Pradhan. Another bust by Pradhan, gifted to Bristol by Jyoti Basu, sits inside the main foyer of Bristol's City Hall.

A pedestrian path at Stapleton has been named "Rajah Rammohun Walk". There is a 1933 Brahmo plaque on the outside west wall of Stapleton Grove, and railings and a granite memorial stone mark his first burial place in the garden. His tomb and chhatri at Arnos Vale are listed as a Grade II historic site by English Heritage.

Several government agencies have been named for him, including the Raja Rammohun Roy National Agency for ISBN, which regulates ISBN in the Indian publishing industry. The Raja Rammohun Roy Library Foundation was founded 1972 by the Ministry of Culture and funds library improvement projects with the National Mission on Libraries.

== In popular culture ==
A 1965 Indian Bengali-language film Raja Rammohan about Roy's reforms, directed by Bijoy Bose and starring Basanta Chowdhury in the title role.

In 1988, the serial Bharat Ek Khoj picturised a full one episode on Raja Ram Mohan Roy. The title role was played by Anang Desai with Urmila Bhatt, Tom Alter and Ravi Jhankal as supporting cast.

In 1984 Films Division of India created a documentary Raja Rammohan Roy directed by P. C. Sharma.

In 2004, Roy was ranked number 10 in BBC's poll of the Greatest Bengali of All Time.

== See also ==
- Adi Dharm
- Brahmo
- Brahmoism
- British India Society
- Hindu School, Kolkata
- Presidency College, Kolkata
- Scottish Church College, Calcutta
- Raja Rammohun Roy National Agency for ISBN
