= Chhatri =

Elevated, dome-shaped pavilions in Indian architecture

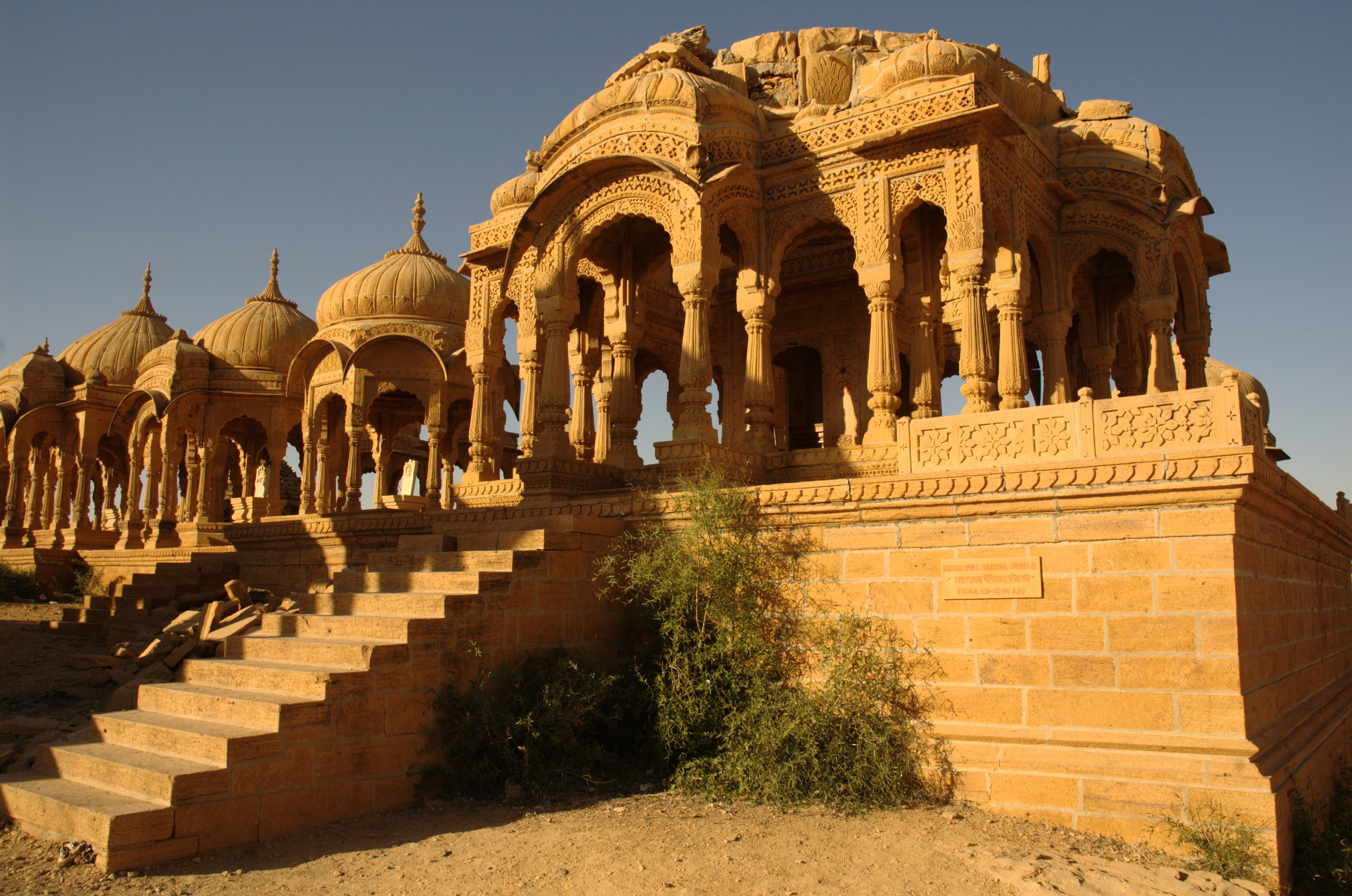
Chhatris up close at Bada Bagh, Rajasthan

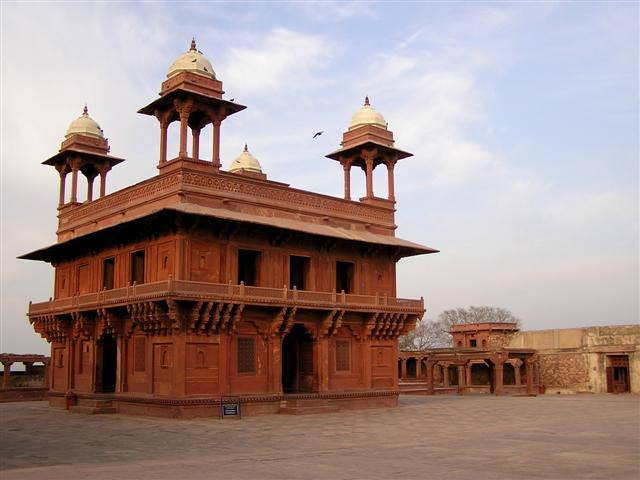
Chhatri set atop each corner of the Hall of Audience in Fatehpur Sikri palace complex.

Chhatri are semi-open, elevated, dome-shaped pavilions used as an element in the varieties of Indian architecture. They are most commonly of square, octagonal, and round shapes.

Originating as a canopy above tombs, they largely serve as decorative elements as opposed to functional elements. The earliest examples of chhatri being used in the Indian subcontinent were found in the Shrine of Ibrahim in Bhadreswar, which dates back to the 12th and 13th century. However, it lacks the relief decoration and this specific design like a twelve-pillar chattri built on a square plan with a corbelled ceiling that actually originates from the Hindu architecture of Northwest India, where it had been commonly used to build temple porches regularly since at least the 11th century.

Chhatri are found particularly within Mughal architecture that came from Bengal Deltaic Architecture.The artisans and architects of bengal brought this feature to the Darbar of powerful officials both hindu and muslim. The most notable surviving examples today are to be found at Humayun's Tomb in Delhi and the Taj Mahal in Agra. The Berar Sultanate in the Deccan added chhatris on buildings in its various capitals. Chhatri have also been used in Rajasthan and other parts of the Indian subcontinent by both Muslim and Hindu rulers.

They are primarily used to manipulate skylines, an important aspect of Bengal architecture. For instance, they may be added to building roofs, and larger chhatri may be used as cenotaphs. Its origins are, however, Rajastani. While chhatri in Shekhawati may consist of a simple structure of one dome raised by four pillars to a building containing many domes and a basement with several rooms. In some places, the interior of the chhatri is painted in the same manner as the haveli (mansions) of the region.

== Etymology ==
The term Chhatri is derieved from the hindi chatrī which translates to Umbrella and parasol.

== In Rajasthan ==
Many other chhatri exist in other parts of Rajasthan. Their locations include:

- Jaipur – Gaitore Cenotaphs of the Maharajas of Jaipur. Set in a narrow valley, the cenotaphs of the former rulers of Jaipur consist of the somewhat typical chhatri or umbrella-shaped memorials. Sawai Jai Singh II's Chhatri is particularly noteworthy because of the carvings that have been used to embellish it.
- Jodhpur – Jaswant Thada, the white marble chhatri of Maharaja Jaswant Singh II. The Panchkunda Ki Chhatriyan at Mandore are a group of chhatri built on early cremation grounds of Marwar royal family.
- Bharatpur- the cenotaphs of the members of the Jat royal family of Bharatpur, who perished whilst fighting against the British in 1825, are erected in the town of Govardhan. The chhatri of Maharaja Suraj Mal of Bharatpur has fine frescos illuminating the life of Surajmal, vividly depicting darbar and hunting scenes, royal processions and wars.
- Udaipur- Flanked by a row of enormous stone elephants, the Lake Pichola island has an impressive chhatri carved from gray blue stone, built by Maharana Jagat Singh.
- Haldighati – A beautiful Chhatri with white marble columns, dedicated to Rana Pratap, stands here. Chetak Smarak, the cenotaph dedicated to Chetak, Rana Pratap's famous horse, is also noteworthy.
- Alwar – Moosi Maharani ki Chhatri is a beautiful red sandstone and white marble cenotaph of the rulers of Alwar.
- Bundi – Suraj Chhatri and Mordi Ki Chhatri, Chaurasi Khambon ki Chhatri, Bundi and Nath Ji ki Chhatri are located in Bundi. Rani Shyam Kumari wife of Raja Chhatrasal on the northern hill constructed the Suraj Chhatri and Mayuri the second wife of Chhatrasal on the southern hill erected Mordi Ki Chhatri.
- Jaisalmer – Bada Bagh, a complex with chhatris of Jai Singh II (d. 1743) and subsequent Maharajas of Jaisalmer.
- Bikaner – Devi Kund near Bikaner is the royal crematorium place with a number of cenotaphs. The chhatri of Maharaja Surat Singh is most imposing. It has the spectacular Rajput paintings on the ceilings.
- Ramgarh – Seth Ram Gopal Poddar Chhatri
- Nagaur – Nath Ji ki Chhatri, Amar Singh Rathore-ki-Chhatri
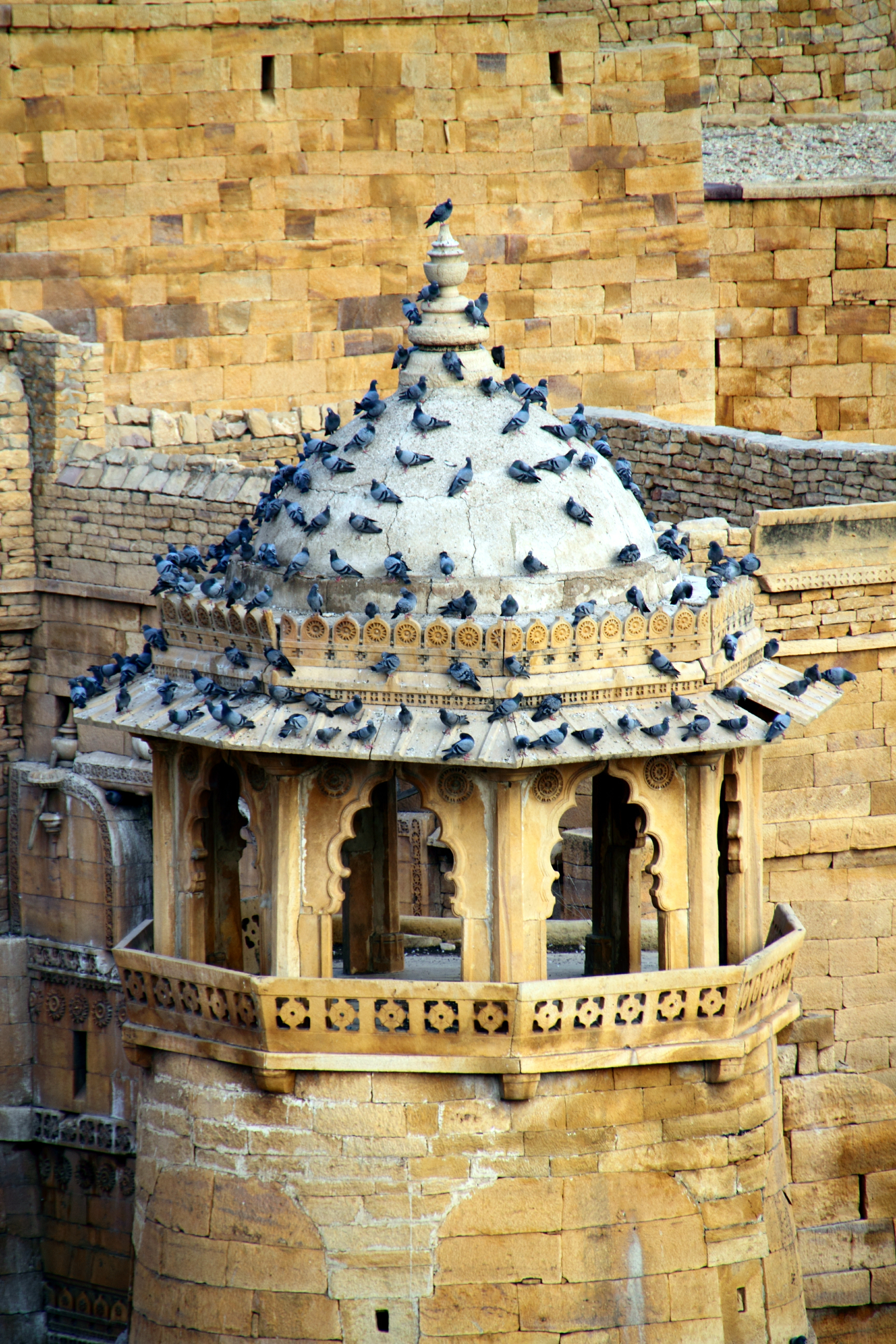
A 12th-century chatri, Jaisalmir

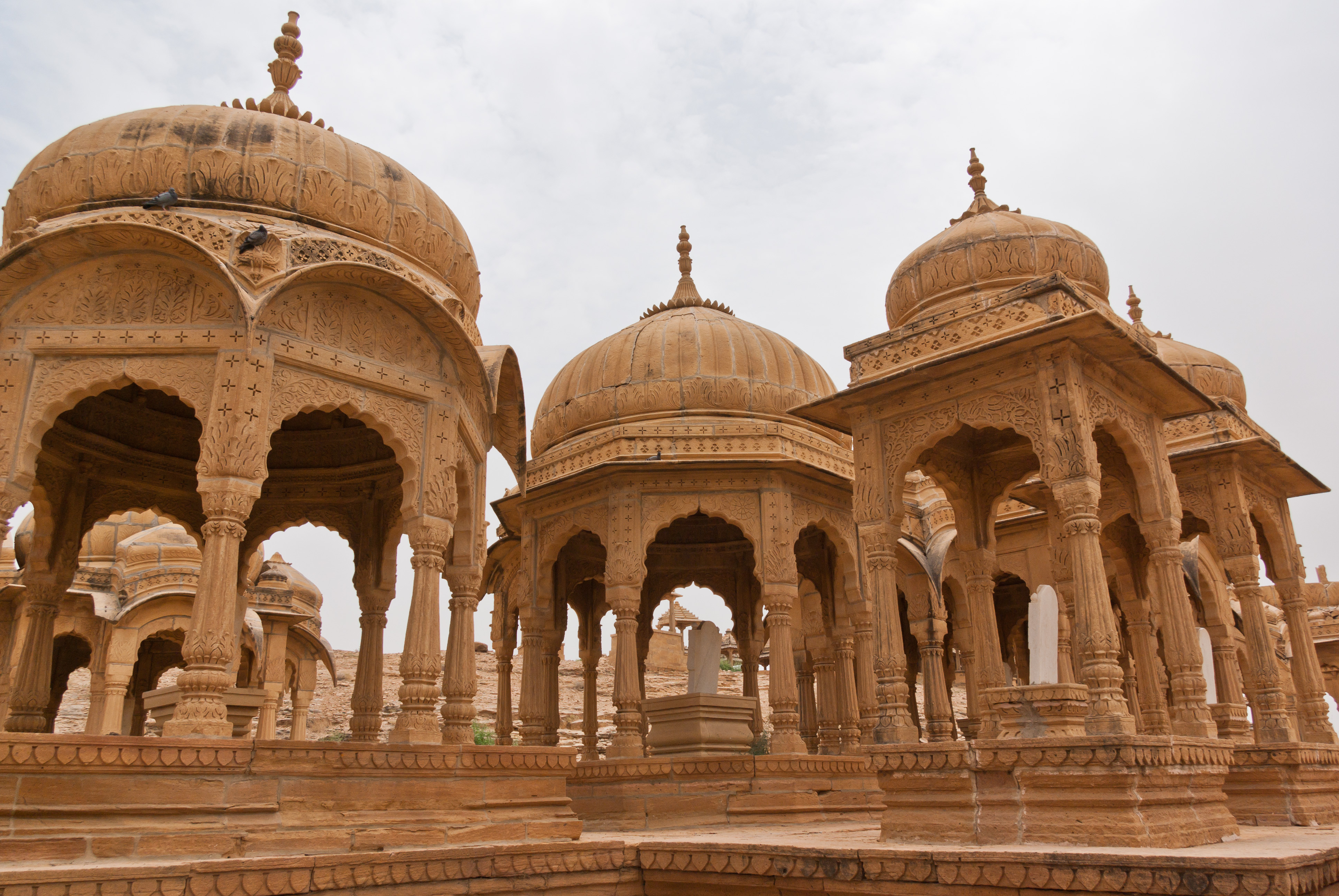
Bada Bagh at Jaisalmer

Chhatri at Rajgarh, Rajasthan

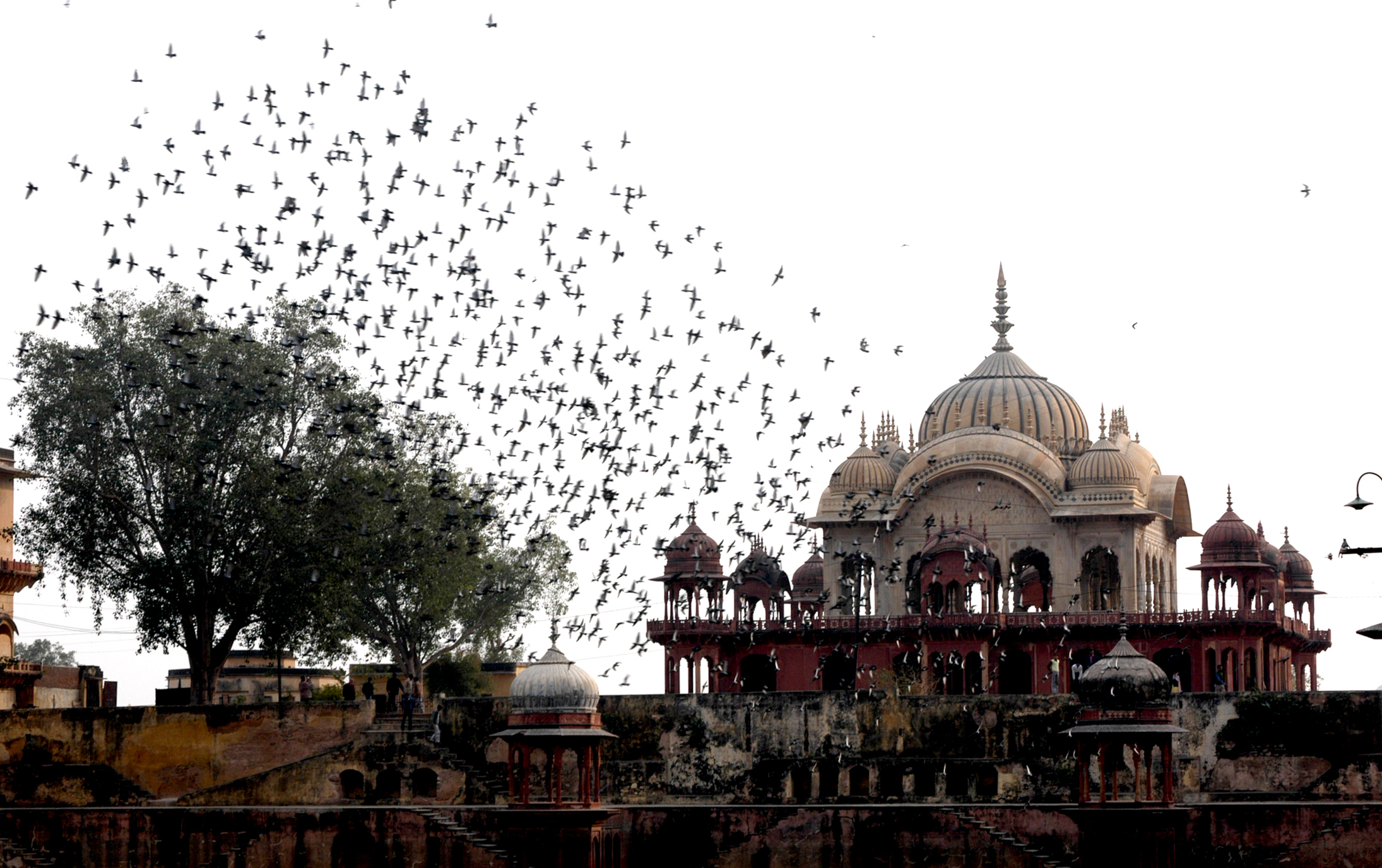
Moosi Rani Ki Chhatri, Alwar

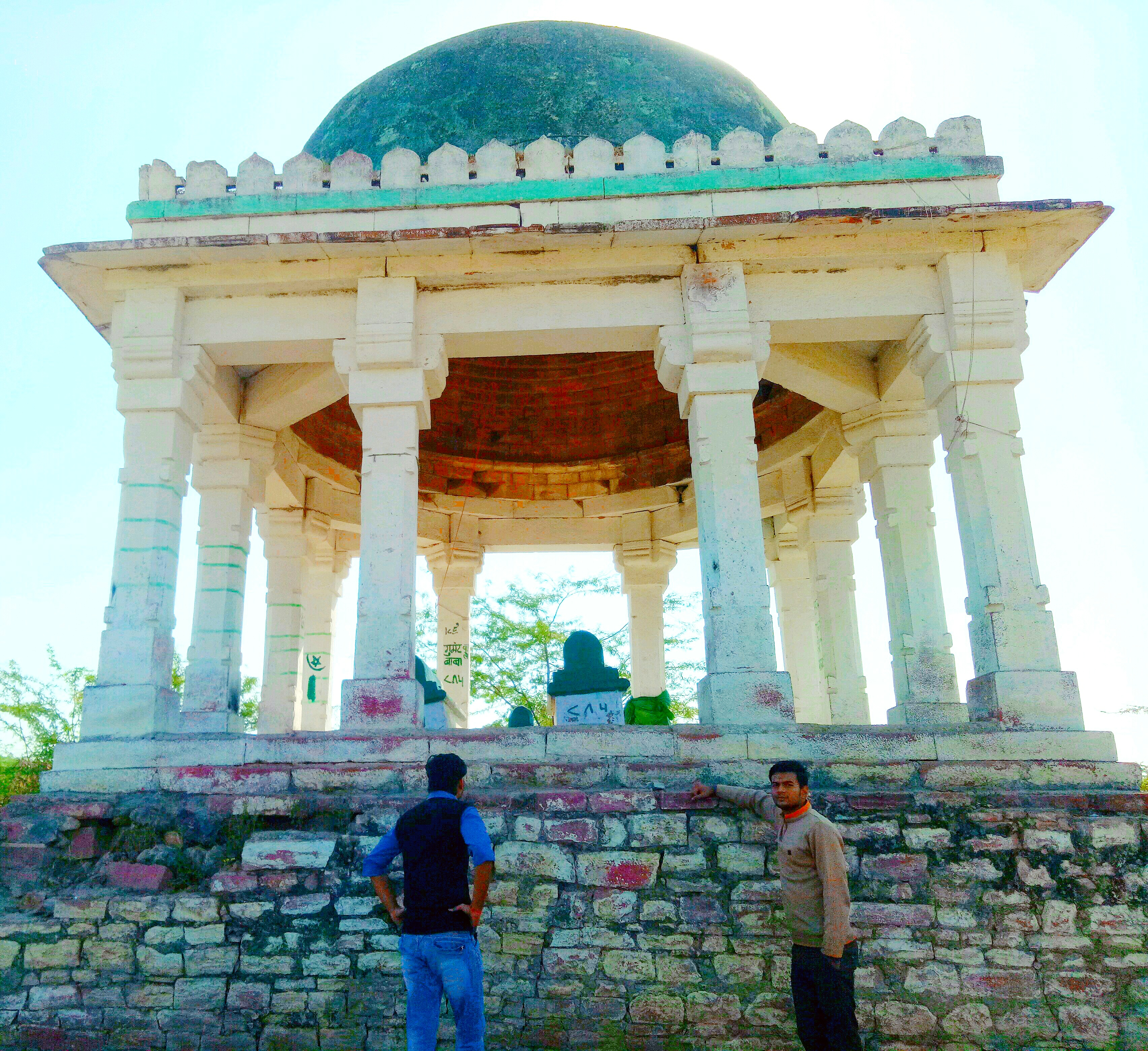
Barah Khamba Chhatri at Jalsen Talab in Hindaun

=== In Shekhawati ===
Some of the best-known chhatri in the Shekhawati region of Rajasthan are located in the following cities and towns:

- Ramgarh – Ram Gopal Poddar Chhatri
- Laxmangarh - Churiwala ki Chhatri
- Bissau – The Raj ki Chhatri of the Shekhawat Thakurs
- Parsurampura – Thakur Sardul Singh Shekhawat's chhatri
- Jhunjhunu – Chhatri of Shekhawat Rulers
- Dundlod – The beautiful chhatri of Ram Dutt Goenka
- Mukungarh – Shivdutta Ganeriwala Chhatri
- Churu – Taknet Chhatri
- Mahansar – The Sahaj Ram Poddar Chhatri
- Udaipurwati – Joki Das Shah ki Chhatri
- Fatehpur – Jagan Nath Singhania Chhatri

== In Madhya Pradesh ==
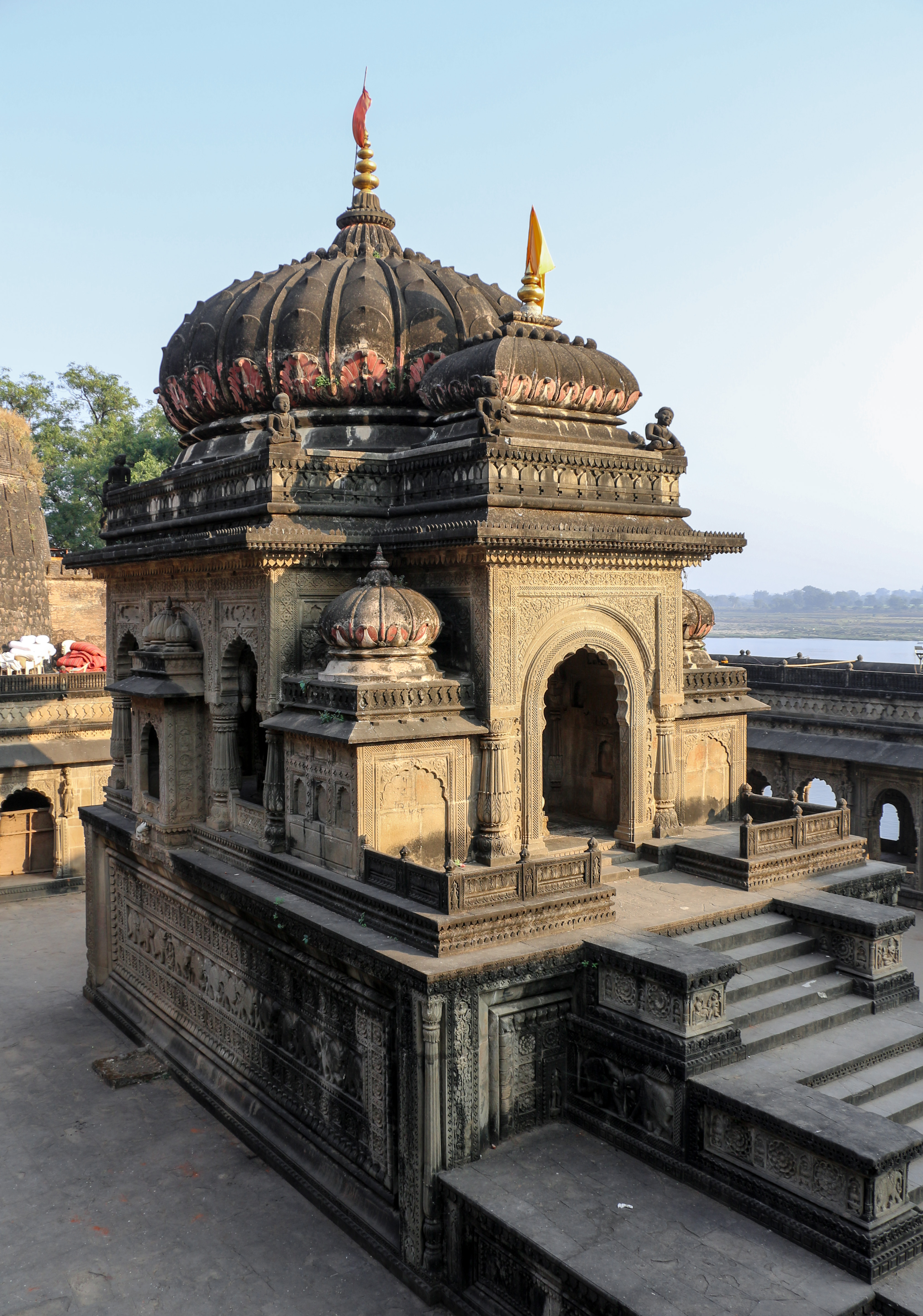
Chhatri of Vithoji in Maheshwar.

The region of Madhya Pradesh is the site of several other notable chhatri of its famous Maratha rulers:

- Shujalpur – Tomb of Ranoji Scindia, founder of the Scindia dynasty. Situated at Ranoganj, Shujalpur to Akodia Road.
- Shivpuri – Intricately embellished marble chhatri erected by Scindia rulers in Shivpuri.
- Gwalior – Shrimati Balabai Maharaj Ladojirao Shitole Chhatri
- Gwalior – Rajrajendra Ramchandrarao Narsingh Shitole and wife Gunwantyaraje Ramchandrarao Shitole (princess of Gwalior) Chatri
- Orchha – Elaborate chhatri of local Hindu kings
- Gohad – The Jat rulers of Gohad constructed the chhatri of Maharaja Bhim Singh Rana on the Gwalior Fort.
- Indore and Maheshwar – Chhatri of Holkar rulers.
- Alampur – Maharani Ahilya Bai Holkar built the chhatri of Malhar Rao Holkar at Alampur in Bhind district in 1766.

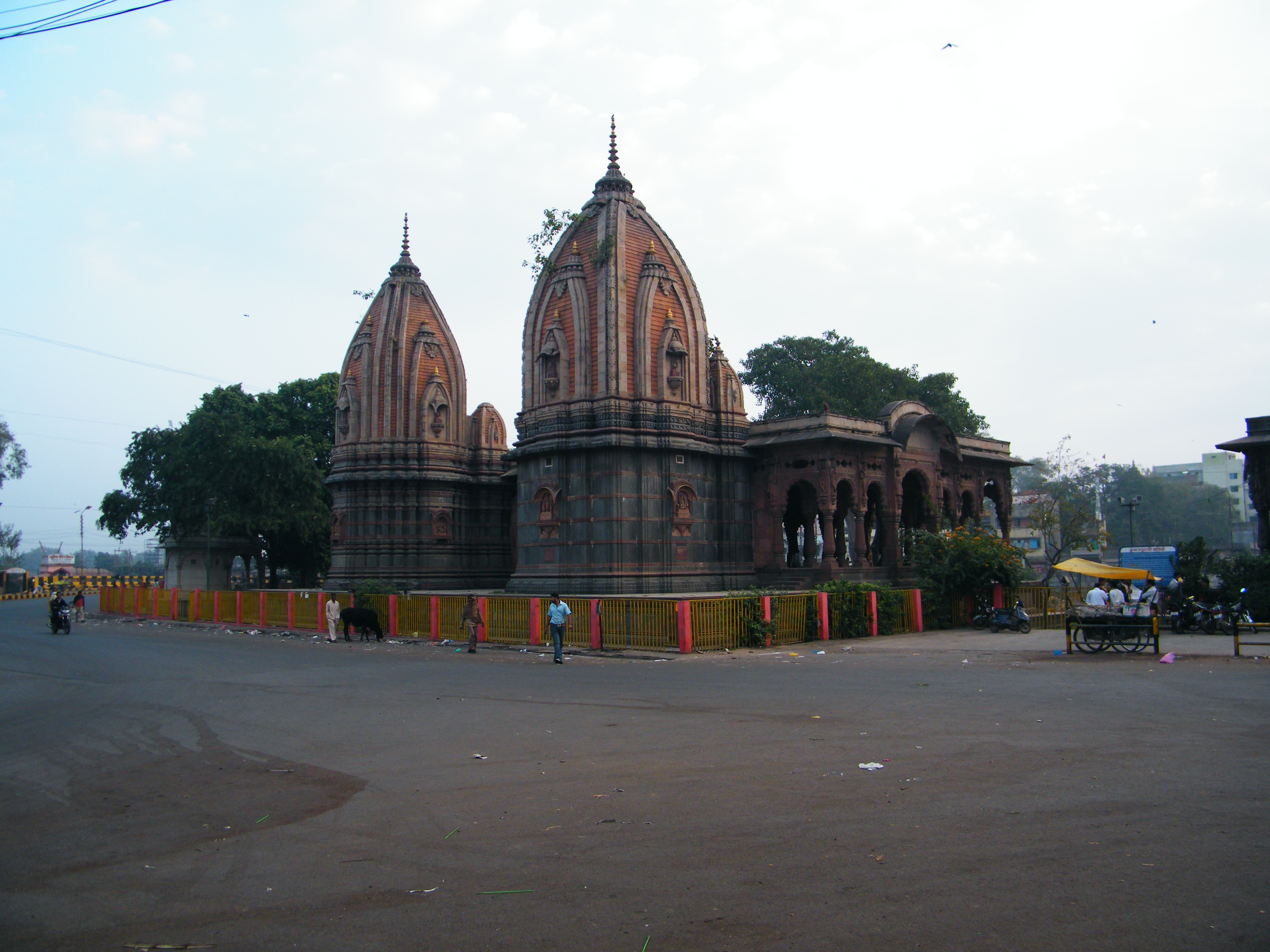
Krishnapura Chhatri, Indore

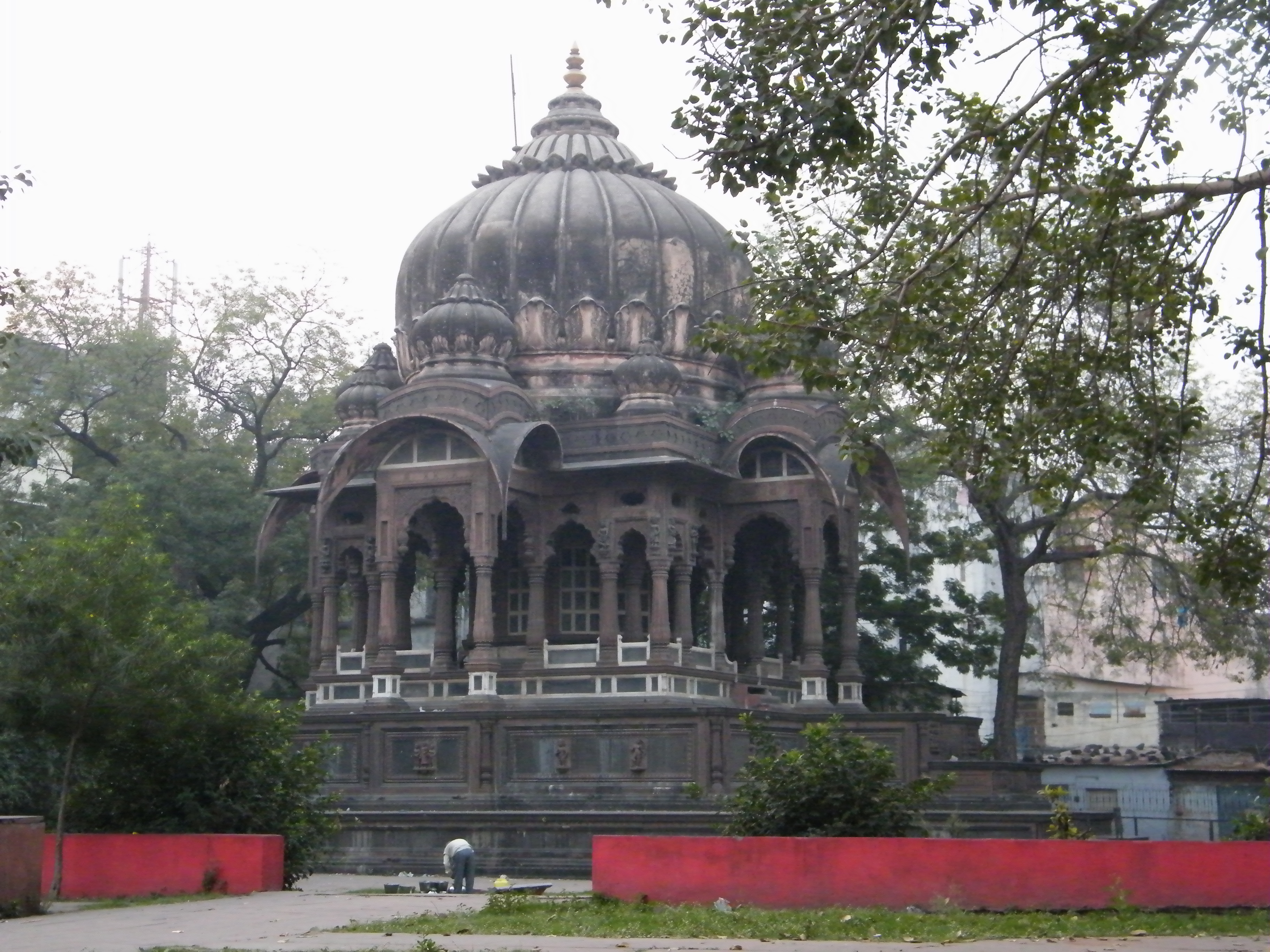
Bolia Maharaj Ki Chhatri, Indore

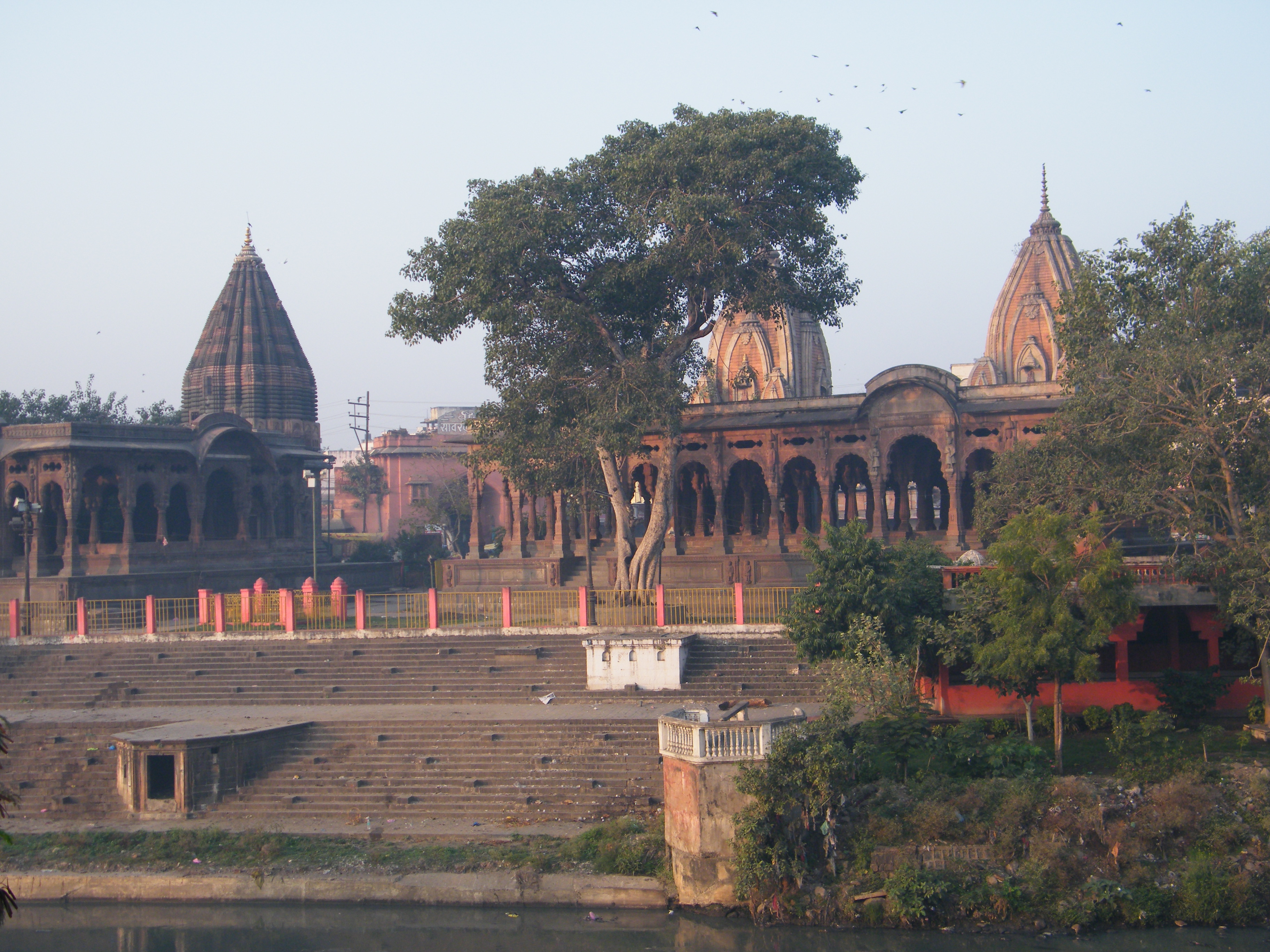
Krishnapura Chhatri, Indore

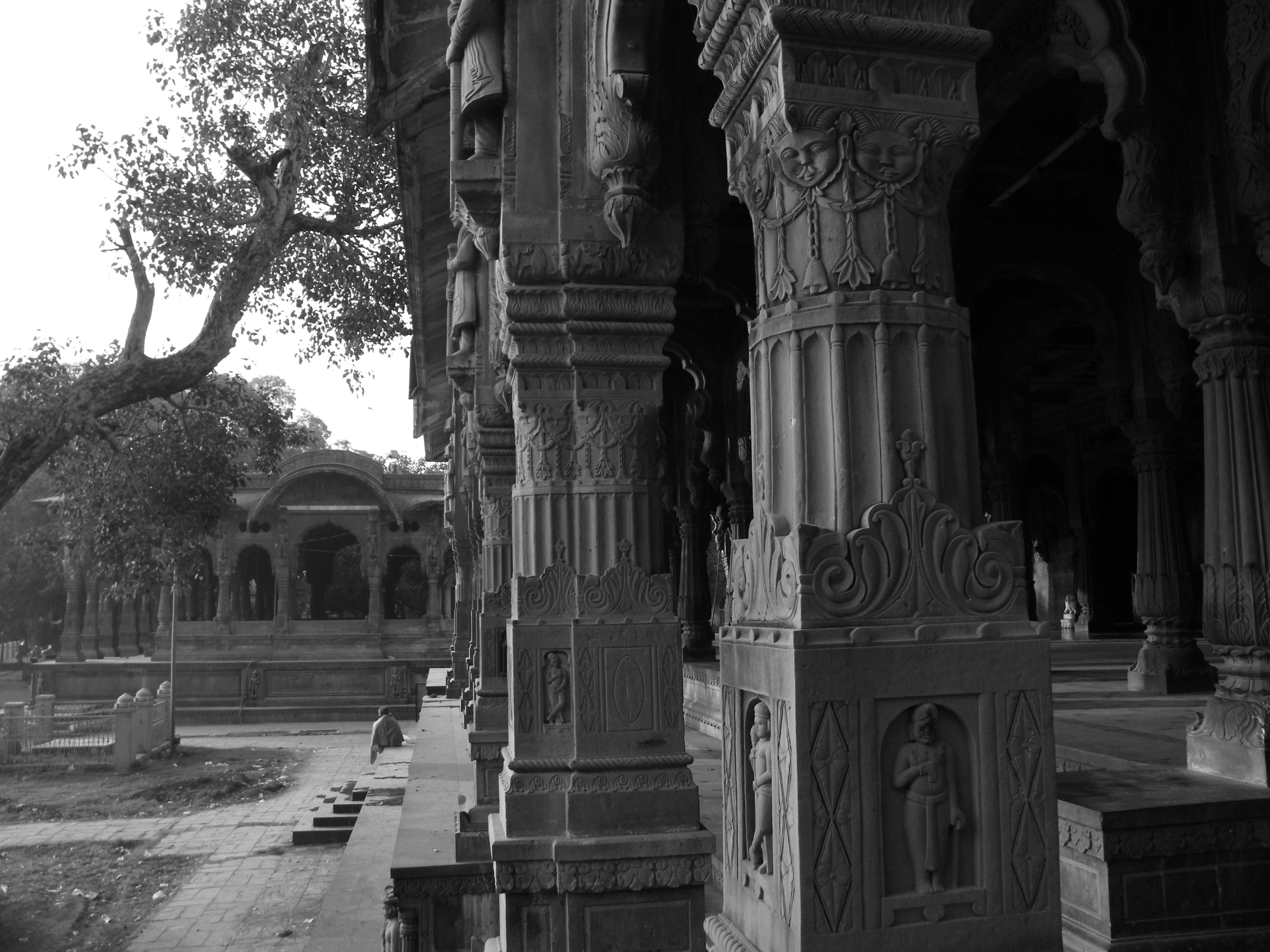
Inside view of Krishnapur Chhatri, Indore

== Mughal architecture ==
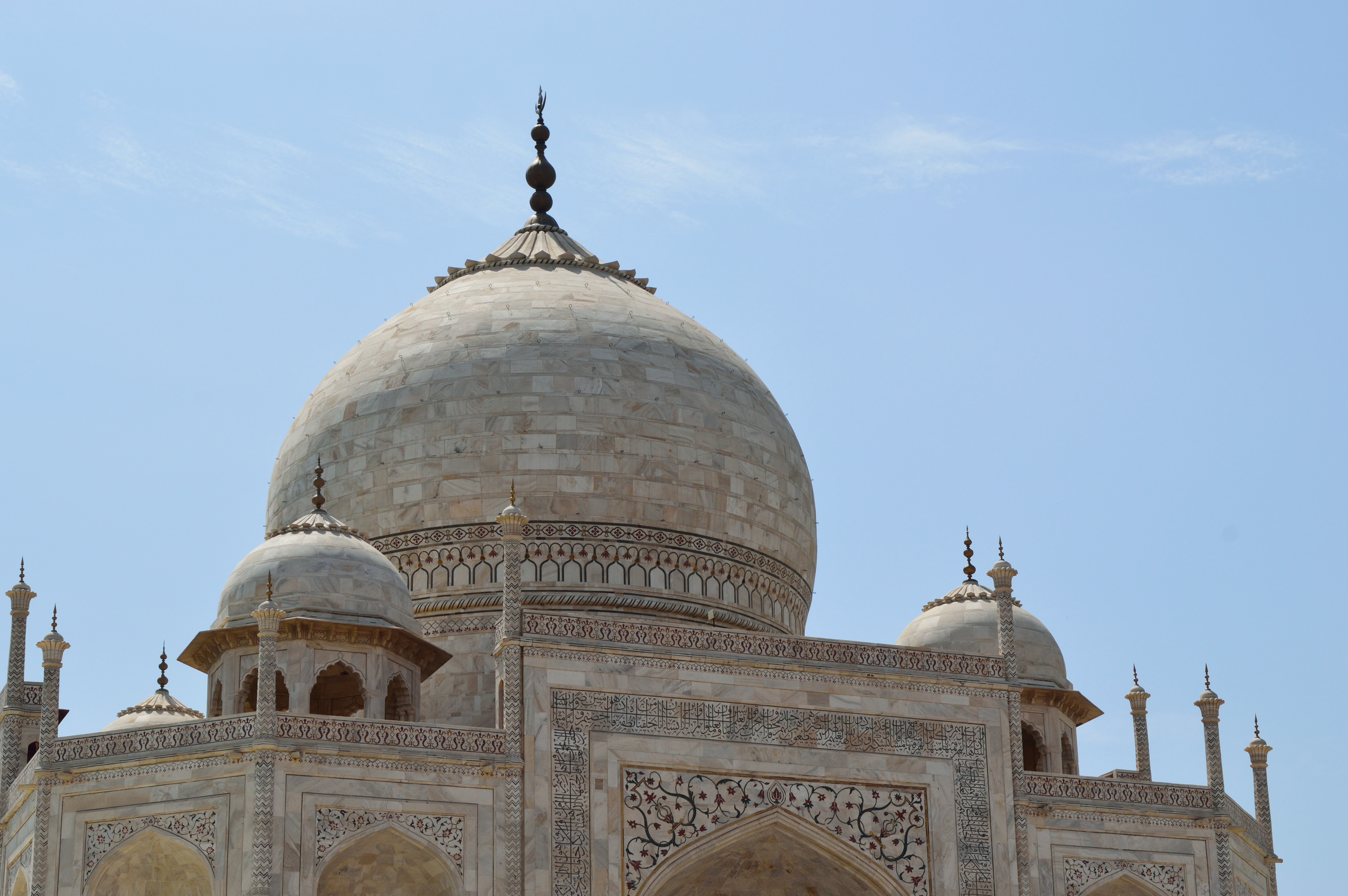
Dome-Shaped Chhatris Spires on the Taj Mahal.

Chhatri were features in many buildings of Mughal architecture:

- The Taj Mahal has four Chhatris surrounding the Main Dome
- Humayun's Tomb has several Chhatris near the dome.
- The Panch Mahal, Fatehpur Sikri is crowned with a domed chhatri that overlooks the men's area.

== In Kutch ==
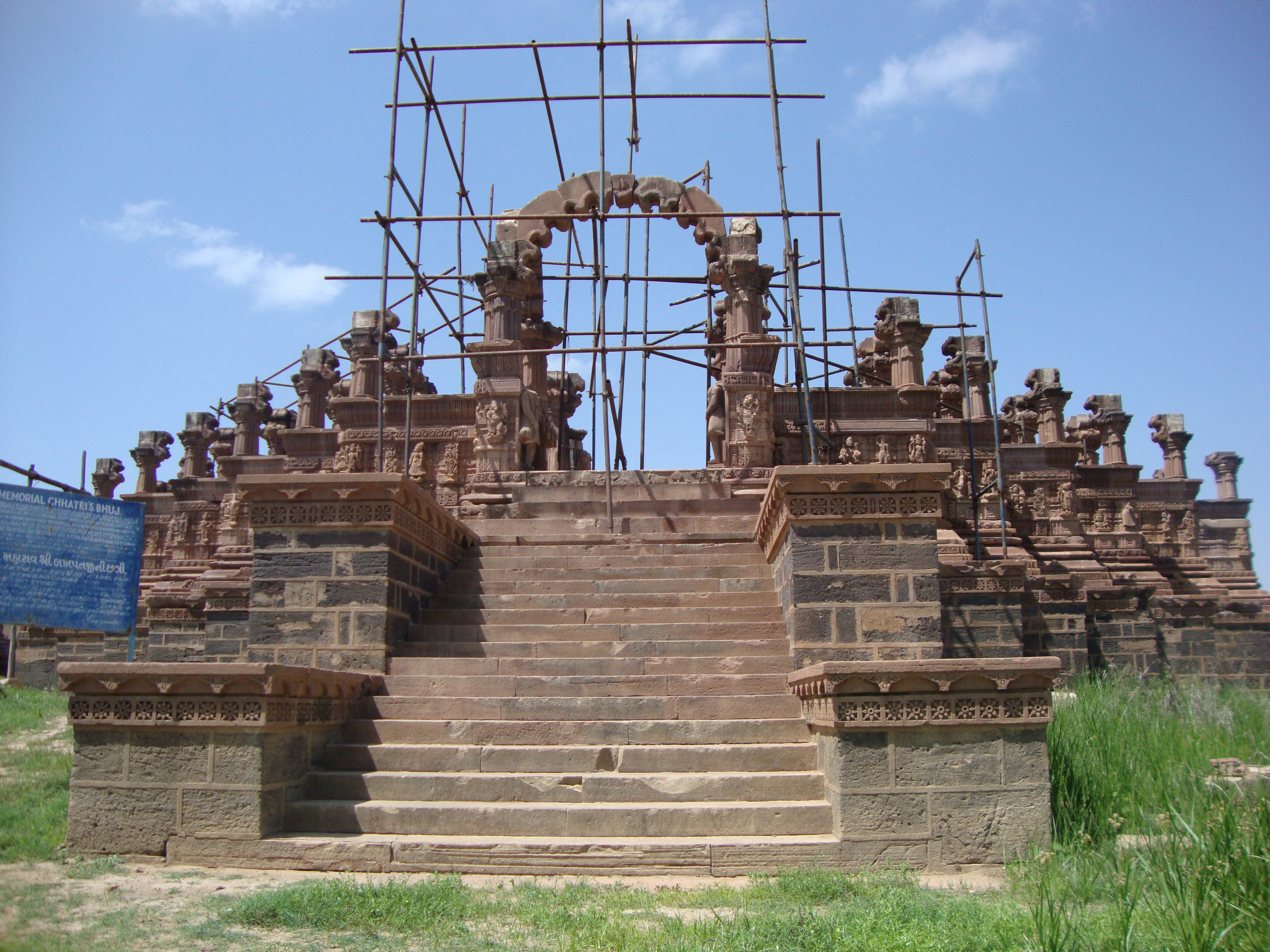
Rao Lakhaji Chhatri Bhuj

Chhatri can also be found in the outskirts of Bhuj city belonging mainly to Jadeja rulers of Kutch. The chhatri of Rao Lakhpatji is very famous for its intricate designs and carvings. Most of them but have been destroyed in the 2001 Gujarat earthquake. The restoration work is going on.

== Outside India ==
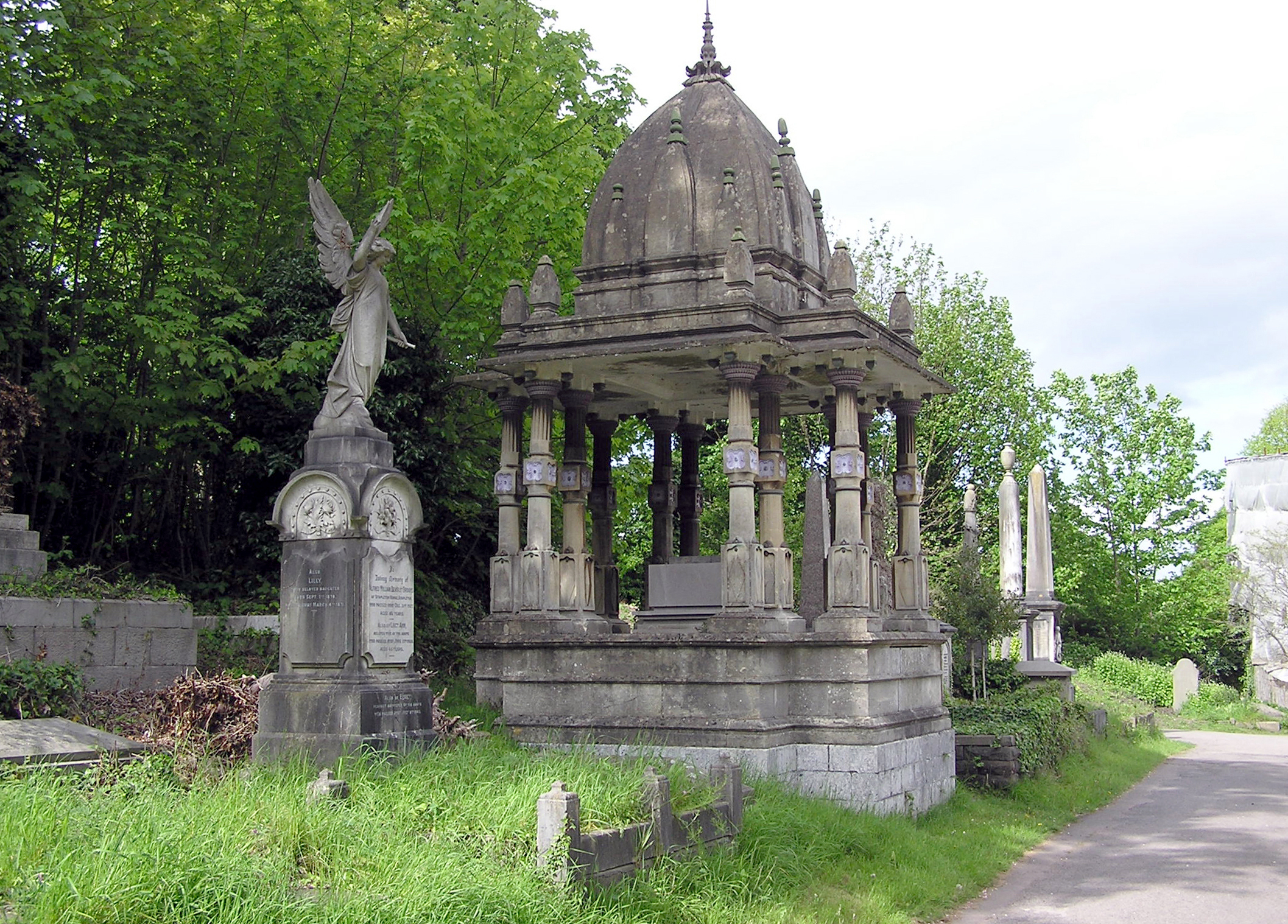
Chhatri of Ram Mohan Roy in Arnos Vale Cemetery, Bristol, England

There are two notable chhatri in the United Kingdom, a country with strong historical links to India. One is a cenotaph in Brighton, dedicated to the Indian soldiers who died in the First World War.

The other is in Arnos Vale Cemetery near Bristol and is a memorial to the distinguished Indian reformer Raja Ram Mohan Roy, who died in that city.

== Major Chhattris ==
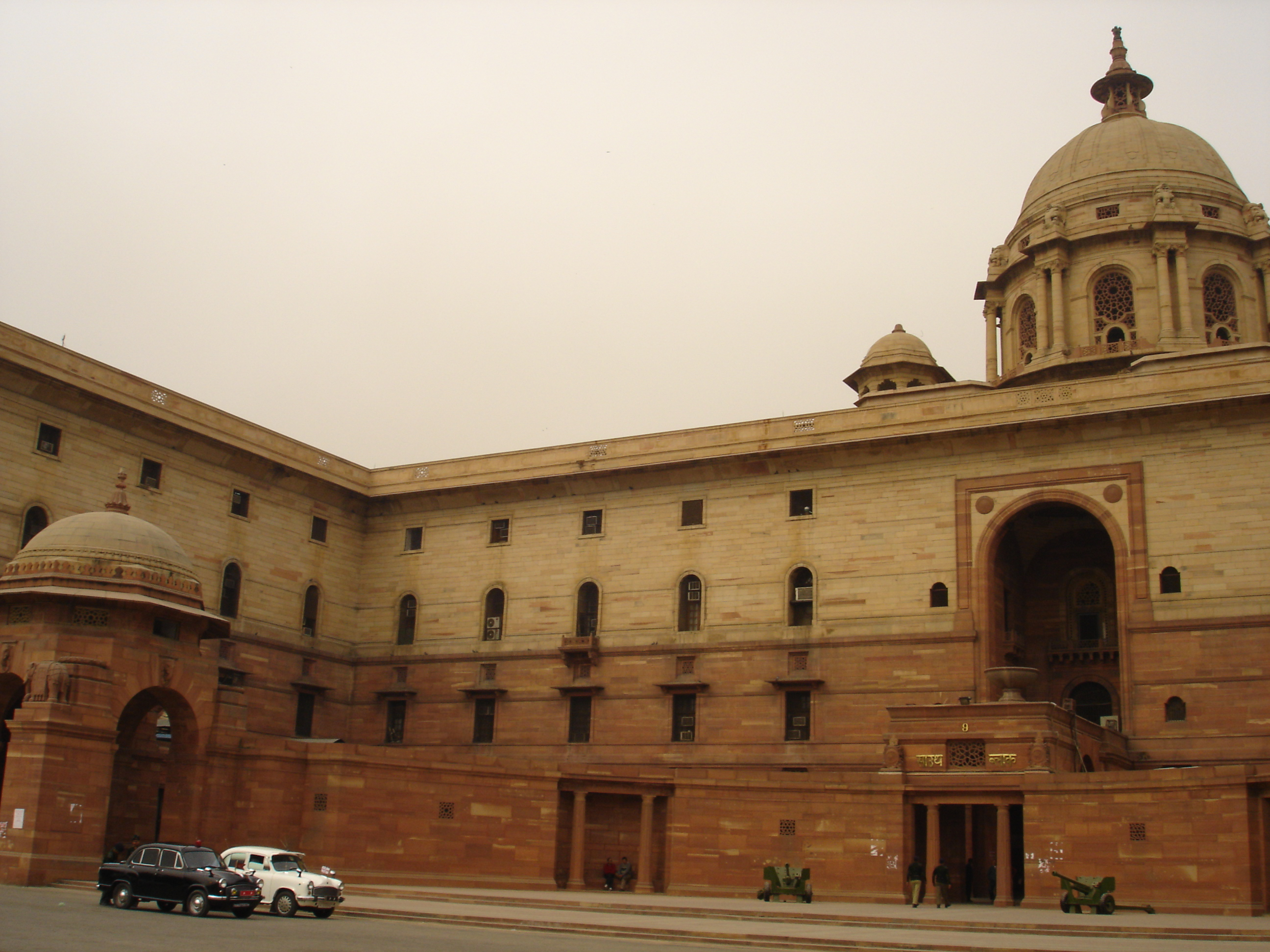
Chhatari of President's House

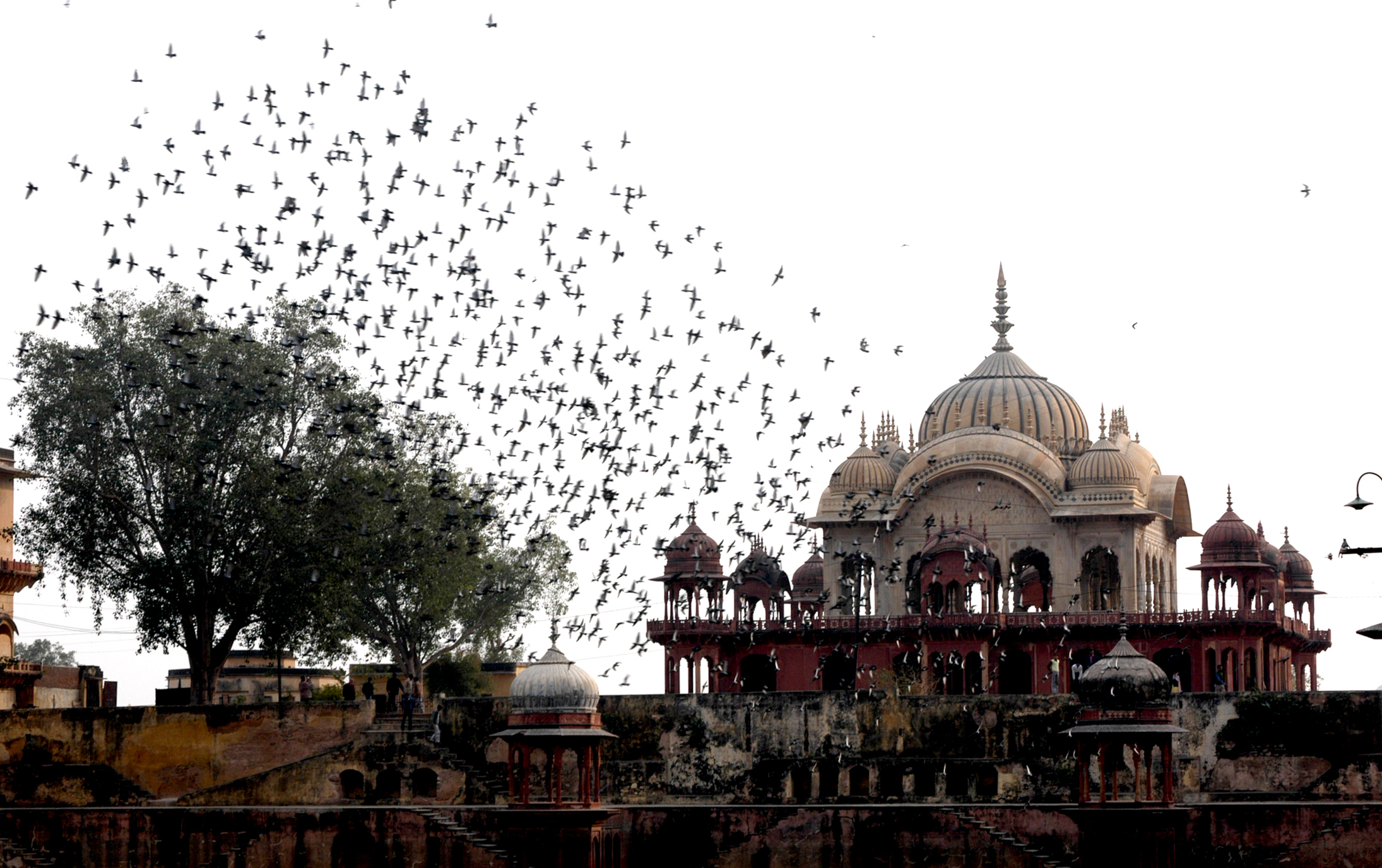
Chhatri of Musi Rani of Alwar

84 Khambho ki Chhatri- memorial of Shatrusal (1631 AD), Bundi ruler - contemporary of Shah Jahan. Built in the memory of Rao Raja Aniruddh Singh's nursemaid Deva, near Devpura village of Bundi.

=== Chhataris of Kesarbagh ===
Kesarbagh, located about 4-5 kilometers from Bundi, has 66 chhatris of rulers of Bundi and royal families. The oldest among these is chhatri of Maharaj Kumar Dadu and the newest is the chhatri of Maharaja Raja Vishnu Singh.

=== Musi Maharani ki chhatri ===
Their canopy is located in Rajasthan's Alvar The canopy of 60 the pillars of Hindu architecture on the south side of Sagar below the Bala Durg was built in the memory of the Musi Queen of Maharaja Bakhtar Singh during the period of Maharaja Vinay Singh. The upper storey of this canopy, built of white marble and red sandstone, is also decorated with mural paintings depicting scenes from the Ramayana and the Mahabharata.

=== Chhataris of Tehla ===
These chhatris are also located in Alwar district of Rajasthan.

The Mishraji Chhatri located here is particularly renowned; it was constructed around 1432 CE.

The dome of this chhatri is supported by eight upright, square pillars. The distinguishing feature of this chhatri is the unparalleled ornamentation of its mural paintings.

== See also ==
- Cenotaph
- Chahartaq (architecture)
- Cupola
- Jaswant Ki Chhatri
- Roof lantern
- Chattri, Brighton, a memorial to Indian soldiers
- Samadhi (shrine)
