= Jaswant Ki Chhatri =

Jaswant Singh ki Chhatri
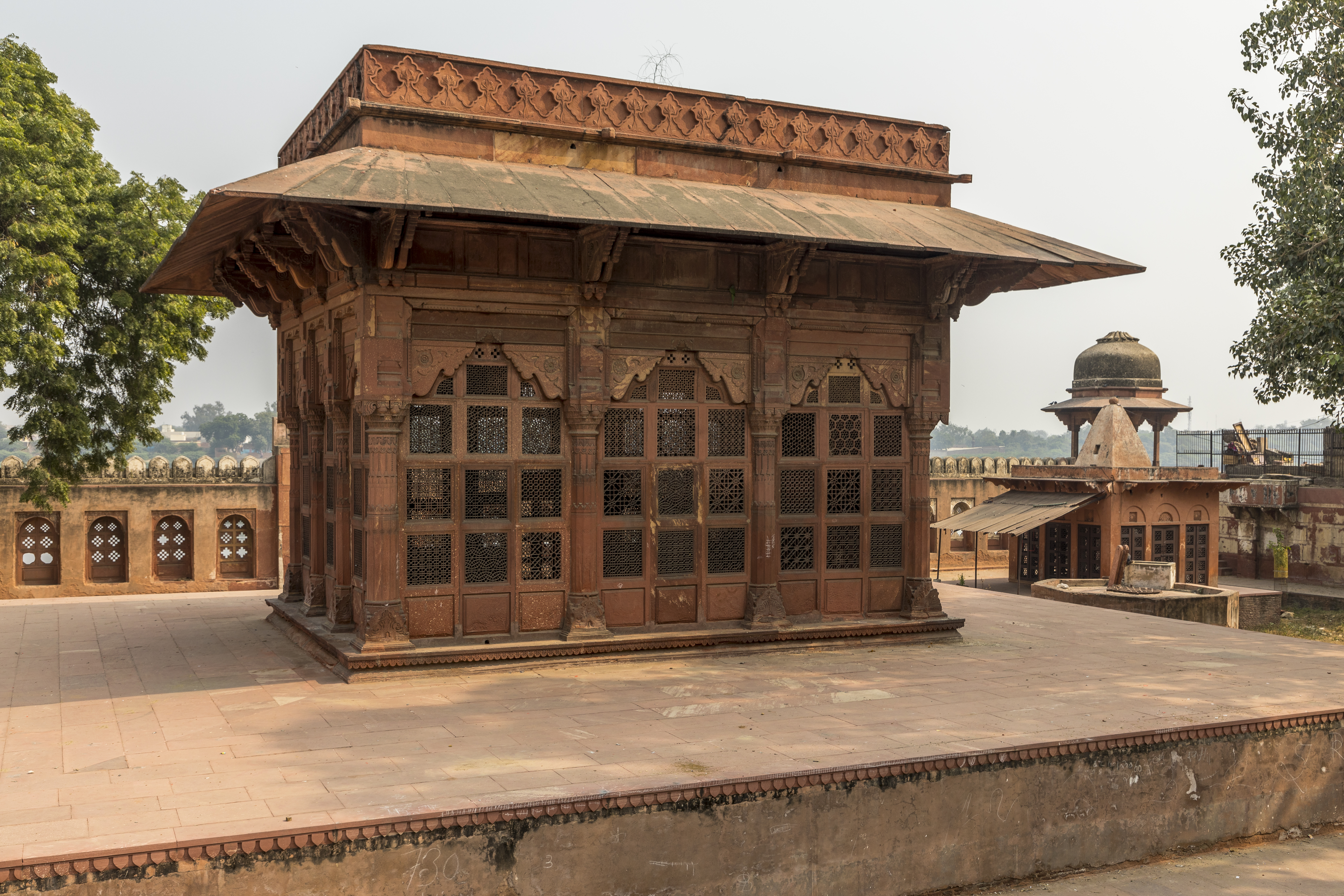
- Jaswant Singh ki Chhatri along the banks of Yamuna in Agra
- Interactive map of Jaswant Singh ki Chhatri
- Location: Rajwara, Balkeshwar, Agra, India
- Builder: Jaswant Singh Rathore
- Type: Chhatri
- Dedicated to: Rani Hada, wife of Amar Singh Rathore

Jaswant Singh ki chhatri (or Jaswant ki chatri) is a domed pillared pavilion-shaped cenotaph, common to Rajasthani architecture, built in c. 1644–58 AD by Jaswant Singh Rathore in memory of his elder brother Amar Singh Rathore's wife, Rani Hada. This chhatri is situated in Rajwara, Balkeshwar, along the banks of river Yamuna, in Agra. It is now maintained by the Archaeological Survey of India (ASI) as a monument of National importance.

== History ==
The Chhatri was built in 1644–58 AD, dedicated to Rani Hada, princess of Bundi in Rajasthan, who was married to Amar Singh Rathore. Amar Singh Rathore was killed on 25 July 1644 at Agra Fort. His body was given to his widow, Hada Rani, who committed sati on the spot. Raja Jaswant Singh, younger brother of Amar Singh Rathore, built this commemorative Chhatri.

The Chhatri is not of Raja Jaswant Singh II, who died and was cremated at Jamrud, Khyber Pass, in 1678. Later, his Chhatri was built at Mandor, in Jodhpur, known as Jaswant Thada.

== Architecture ==
The chattri is a unique feature of Rajput architecture, primarily seen in Shekhawati areas of Rajasthan. Jaswant Ki Chhatri is a square, pavilion‑style cenotaph executed in finely dressed red sandstone atop a raised plinth and enclosed by a low perimeter wall. Its main chamber is defined by four sides of exquisite open stone lattice (jali) in varied geometric and floral patterns, creating a semi‑outdoor hall without a dome, unlike contemporary chhatris of Mughal architecture. The exterior enclosure wall facing the river is richly ornamented in relief with the long‑necked surai motif surrounded by floral wreaths, recalling the decorative programs of Agra Fort's Bulandi Bagh. Doorways and windows in the enclosure are fitted with single‑stone folding leaves, mounted on mortise‑and‑tenon pivots, exemplifying advanced stone‑working techniques of the period. Beneath the pavilion lies a shallow water tank accessed by corner steps, once used for ritual ablutions and to cool the structure in the summer months.
