= Oswaal Books =

Indian educational publishing company

- Type: Privately held company
- Industry: Educational publishing
- Founded: 1984
- Founder: Naresh Jain
- Headquarters: Agra, India
- Key people: Naresh Jain (Founder); Shobha Jain (Director of Sales); Prashant Jain (Chief Executive Officer); Swaati Jain (Editor-in-Chief); Divya Bansal (Director of Operations)

Oswaal Books is an educational publishing company based in Agra, Uttar Pradesh, India. It was founded in 1984 by Naresh Jain. His wife, Shobha Jain, has served as the company's Director of Sales since its establishment. Oswaal Books publishes material for school and board examinations, as well as for competitive and entrance examinations. The company is headed by CEO Prashant Jain. It also operates Oswaal AI, a digital platform for question-solving and syllabus-linked study tools.

== History ==
Oswaal Books was established in 1984 by Naresh Jain in Agra, Uttar Pradesh. The business began with an investment of ₹100,000 borrowed from friends. Its early publications were aimed at students preparing for the Madhya Pradesh Board examinations.

In 2007, Naresh Jain's son, Prashant Jain, joined the company after returning from London, along with his wife, Swaati Jain. Swaati Jain later served as Editor-in-Chief. She received the Entrepreneur of the Year award in the Publishing category in 2020.

During Prashant Jain's tenure, the company began offering digital learning and educational technology products in addition to its publishing activities.

== Publications ==
Oswaal Books publishes educational material for school and board examinations, including question banks, sample papers, and solved previous examination papers for the CBSE, ICSE and ISC, and IGCSE. Its school-level publications cover Classes 9 to 12 and include subjects such as physics, chemistry, mathematics, and biology.

The company also publishes preparation material for competitive and entrance examinations, including JEE, NEET, CAT, CLAT, CDS, NDA, UPSC examinations, UGC NET, SSC examinations, CUET, and Olympiad examinations.

Its Lil Legends imprint publishes books for younger readers, including phonics, handwriting, and tracing titles.

== Public engagement ==
In 2018, Oswaal Books organised roundtable discussions on school education in West Bengal and Andhra Pradesh. Participants included Andhra Pradesh Human Resource Development Minister Ganta Srinivasa Rao and school education commissioners K. Sandhya Rani and Saumitra Mohan.

In 2023, actor Jitendra Kumar became a brand ambassador for the company.

The company has also published trade books by public figures and other authors. These include ''Those 14 Kilometers'' by Neeraj Goyat, ''Unlock Your Potential'' by Kunal Jaisingh, ''Trust Fall'' by Avika Gor, ''A to E: Actor to Entrepreneurship'' by Chahatt Khanna, and ''Unbarbaad'' by Shobhit Nirwana.

Oswaal Books has participated in book fairs in cities including Delhi, Pune, Chennai, Bengaluru, Kolkata, and Patna.

== Operations ==
Oswaal Books distributes its publications through online and offline channels.

== Awards ==
- Oswaal CBSE ICSE Question Banks Awarded With Product of the Year 2022, as per Nielsen nationwide survey

== See also ==
- Book publishing in India
- List of book publishing houses in India
