= Mirat-ul-Akhbar =

Persian-language journal edited by Raja Rammohan Roy

- Editor: Raja Rammohan Roy
- Founded: 12 April 1822
- Ceased publication: 4 April 1823
- Language: Persian

Mirat-ul-Akhbar (Persian: مرآت‌الاخبار; lit. 'Mirror of News') was a Persian-language journal in British colonial India founded and edited by Raja Rammohan Roy. The newspaper was first published on 12 April 1822. It was published on a weekly basis on Fridays. British journalist James Silk Buckingham was also closely involved in the operation of the newspaper. The Mirat-ul-Akhbar was not well-received by the colonial government, and was termed to be theologically controversial by official W.B. Bayley. On April 4, 1823, the colonial government passed a Press Ordinance that introduced regulations against the Indian press, namely the requirement of a license to publish journals. In protest, Roy closed the Mirat-ul-Akhbar on the same day. The journal's final issue listed his criticisms of the Ordinance.

== See also ==
- Raja Rammohan Roy
- Jam-i-Jahan-Numa
