= Brahmanical Magazine =

Early 19th-century Indian reformist magazine

The Brahmanical Magazine was an English-language publication founded by the Indian reformer Raja Rammohan Roy. It was first published in 1821 aimed to counteract the effects of missionary propaganda. During its brief existence, the magazine produced a total of twelve issues before ceasing publication later that same year.
