= Atmiya Sabha =

Discussion circle established by Rammohan Roy

Amitya Sabha
- Formation: 1815
- Founder: Ram Mohan Roy
- Dissolved: 1823
- Location: Kolkata
- Services: Promoting free thinking

Atmiya Sabha was a philosophical discussion circle in India. The association was started by Ram Mohan Roy in 1815 in Kolkata (then Calcutta). They used to conduct debate and discussion sessions on philosophical topics, and also used to promote free and collective thinking and social reform. The foundation of Atmiya Sabha in 1815 is as the beginning of the modern age in Kolkata. In 1823, the association became defunct.

== Activities ==
The main activity of the Sabha was conducting discussion and debate sessions on monotheistic Hindu Vedantism and similar subjects. Weekly meetings used to be conducted in Ram Mohan Roy's garden-house in Maniktala. Most of these gatherings were informal and only a handful of Bengali intellects used to attend these meetings. It was not a formal organization, and there was no membership registration procedure. However, the association intended to promote free and collective thinking. They also challenged and denounced orthodox religions.

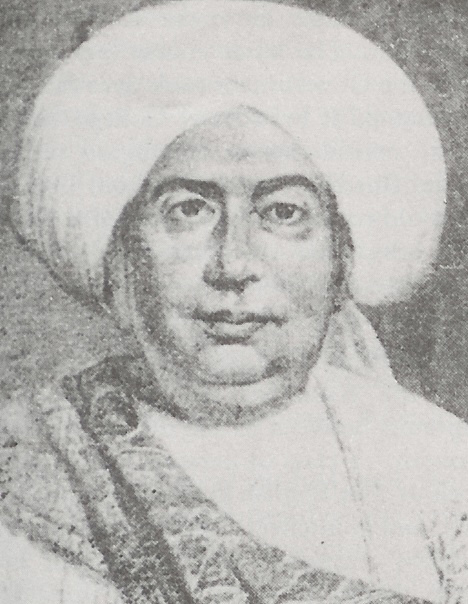
Prasanna Kumar Tagore

== Notable participants ==
Some of the notable people who joined this circle are:

1. Dwaraka Nath Tagore
2. Prasanna Kumar Tagore
3. Nanda Kishore Bose
4. Brindaban Mitra
5. Sivaprasad Misra
6. Hariharananada Tirthaswami

Misra and Tirthaswami were Sanskrit scholars.
