= Printing industry in India =

Printing industry

The printing industry in India is an important industry in that country.

Printing means to produce reproductions of written material or images in multiple copies. There are four traditional types of printing: relief printing (with which this article is mainly concerned), intaglio, lithography, and screen process printing. Relief printing encompasses type, stereotype, electrotype, and letterpress. Flexographic printing is a form of rotary letterpress printing using flexible rubber plates and rapid-drying inks.

== Printing industry ==
The printing industry in India is growing. Since 1989, the printing-packaging industry in particular has grown over 14%. There are more than 36 printing institutes, some of which even offer post-graduate education. Every year more than 3500 new printing engineering graduates join the industry, while others get on-the-spot training in the print shops. Printing, especially printing-packaging, is now one of the largest industries in India.

The growth of this sector is attributable to two main reasons. First is the spread of education: according to the 2011 census, literacy rates have increased. The literacy rate in the country is 74.04 per cent, 82.14 for males and 65.46 for females. This amazing growth in literacy together with rising educational levels and rapidly progressing trade and industry in India make the current situation a happy note. Literacy rate is growing; increase in the literacy rate has direct positive effect on the rise of the circulation of the regional papers. The people are first educated in their mother tongue as per their state in which they live e.g. students in Maharashtra are compulsory taught Marathi language and hence they are educated in their state language and the first thing a literate person does is read papers and gain knowledge and hence higher the literacy rate in a state the sales of the dominating regional paper in the state rises. There's little doubt about India's market potential in print media. According to a national survey, 248 million literate adults still don't read any publication. But readership of newspapers and magazines is up by 15% since 1998 to 180 million. It's a reflection of a younger, more educated population, especially in small-town India, feel experts. India has 49,000 publications, but annual revenues total just $1.1 billion. While they can be vibrant and gutsy, most are starved for technology, marketing, and capital to expand. So a handful of publications dominate. With the growth in literacy, the Indian print media industry is expected to grow at CAGR of 5.7% for the period 2009-13 to reach ₹213.6 billion from ₹161.8 billion in 2008.

== Literacy ==
The growth of this sector attributes to the two main reasons, First is the spread of education- according to the 2001 census report literacy growth in India touched nearly 66 per cent. This amazing growth in literacy together with rising educational levels and rapidly progressing trade and industry in India make the current situation a happy note. Literacy rate is growing; increase in the literacy rate has direct positive effect on the rise of the circulation of the regional papers. The people are first educated in their mother tongue as per their state in which they live e.g. students in Maharashtra are compulsory taught Marathi language and hence they are educated in their state language and the first thing a literate person does is read papers and gain knowledge and hence higher the literacy rate in a state the sales of the dominating regional paper in the state rises. There's little doubt about India's market potential in print media. According to a national survey, 248 million literate adults still don't read any publication. But readership of newspapers and magazines is up by 15% since 1998 to 180 million. It's a reflection of a younger, more educated population, especially in small-town India, feel experts. India has 49,000 publications, but annual revenues total just $1.1 billion. While they can be vibrant and gutsy, most are starved for technology, marketing, and capital to expand. So a handful of publications dominate. With the growth in literacy, the Indian print media industry is expected to grow at CAGR of 5.7% for the period 2009-13 to reach ₹213.6 billion from ₹161.8 billion in 2008.

Newspaper publishing, which constitutes around 87% for the segment in 2008, is expected to grow to ₹184.8 billion in 2013. Magazine publishing is expected to grow to ₹28.8 billion in 2013 from ₹21 billion in 2008 at a CAGR of 6.5%.

Print advertising is expected to have a CAGR of 8.0% and grow from ₹103.5 billion in 2008 to ₹152 billion in 2013. Print industry circulation CAGR is expected to grow at a minimal rate of 1.1% to reach ₹61.6 billion in 2013 from ₹58.3 billion in 2008.

The Indian Print Industry has undergone a revolutionary change in the last 15 years. In 1990, India initiated a process of reforms aimed at shedding protectionism and embracing liberalisation of the economy. Privatisation was initiated with the aim of integrating the Indian economy with the world economy. This change opened the doors for the Indian Print Industry to modernise by investing in the latest of technology and machinery. The average compound annual growth rate has been higher than 12% over the last 15 years. The Indian packaging industry is currently growing at a rate of more than 16% a year. Prior to 1990, most printers invested in East German and Czechoslovak machines. Post 1990, the trend has been to acquire the latest and the best equipment & machines. The progressive printers of today are equipped with the latest computer controlled printing machines and flow lines for binding, while state of the art digital technologies being used in pre-press. Leading print companies in the country have optimised the use of information technology in various areas of their business. These printers are today equipped at par with the best print production facilities in the world.

Today, India is fast becoming one of the major print producer & manufacture of printed paper products for the world markets. The quality standards have improved dramatically and immense production capacities have been created. Some printers have won recognition by winning prizes at international competition for excellence in printing. The current annual turnover of all the components in the Indian printing industry are more than ₹50,000 crores. That is in the region of US$11 Billion.

Indian books, journals and printing jobs, etc. are being exported to over 120 countries of the world both developed and developing. Indian exports of books, printed pamphlets, newspapers and periodicals, job printing and printed materials during 2004-05 was estimated to the tune of US$550 million.

The Indian Printing Industry, growing at a rate of 12% per annum, comprises more than 250,000 printing companies. The current annual turnover of is more than ₹50,000 crores (US$11 billion). India is the country with largest number of printing presses in the world (Europe: 1.18 lakh, China: 1.13 lakh, USA: 50,000, Japan: 45,000, Korea: 42,000 and Australia: 40,000). India with approx. 25 lakh employees is second only to China (30.25 lakh) so far as the number of employees in printing sector is concerned. Employees and number of printing companies are decreasing by 6 per cent world over, including China, whereas in India it is progressing at 5.2 per cent annually. The industry has undergone a revolutionary change in the last 15 years. In 1990, India initiated a process of reforms aimed at shedding protectionism and embracing liberalisation of the economy. Privatisation was initiated with the aim of integrating the Indian economy with the world economy. This change opened the doors for the Indian Print Industry to modernise, by investing in the latest of technology and machinery. In recent years, the printing industry in India has seen record levels of growth, owing to liberalised regimes, globalisation and progress in automation. The industry has grown leaps and bounds due to the latest technology and machinery, quality standards and production capacities.

== Overview ==
The compounded annual growth rate of the Indian Printing Industry is estimated to be 12.2% for the period 2007-12. The objective is to achieve 60% growth by the year of 2014. The printing industry of India is highly fragmented. Newspapers and magazine publishing section have the large printers apart from a few in package, label and commercial printing. About 77% of the printing houses are family-owned. From 2002 inwards the government allowed foreign investment. Foreign investors can now invest up to 26% in daily newspapers and 100% in scientific or other publications with government approval. Printing sector has evolved from a manufacturing industry into a service industry in India of late. Publishing have come up to the international standards as well.

Most of the large printers are found in big cities of Delhi, Kolkata, Mumbai, Hyderabad, Chennai, and Sivakasi, which has emerged as a commercial printing hub and accounts for a major share of exports from the Indian printing industry.

India's biggest international exhibition on Printing and Packaging is Printpack India which is organised by an Association called IPAMA. The Indian printing industry will reach nearly $20.9 billion by 2015, a government official said at the ninth edition of the international exhibition on printing and allied machinery industries (PAMEX) which was inaugurated at Greater Noida. With the exponential growth, the organisers expect India to become the largest printing market by 2015 aided by low-cost production and ready-to-adopt new technology. The event is also being supported by the Indian Newspaper Society (INS) and the Federation of Indian Publishers. It is the only dedicated international exhibition for the industry organised in Asia. The printing industry in India is slowly progressing from the heavy machinery using industry to a more software-centric business. The Indian printers are today equipped with the latest computer controlled printing machines and flow lines for binding, while state-of-the-art digital technologies are used in pre-press. UV digital printing and inkjet technology are also on the rise in India. The advent of global brands, rising consumerism and growth of the pharmaceutical industry have seen an increase in the scope for package printing. Giving an optimistic outlook of the industry, the package printing sector is growing at the annual rate of 18 percent, commercial printing at a rate of 4 – 6 percent and digital printing at robust 30 percent. The digital printing industry is seeing significant transformations with new technologies & applications providing cost-effective and customised solutions. For the foreseeable future, offset and digital will not only co-exist, but will also complement each other- with offset taking the medium-to-longer jobs and digital performing on short-to-medium run lengths. The booming Indian economy, increasing consumerism, entry of global brands in the country and opening of the sector to foreign investors are bound to offer growth opportunities to this industry.

IPAMA is an association of printing packaging and allied machinery manufacturers, and the biggest association of machine manufacturers. All India Federation of Master Printers (AIFMP) is the apex body of Indian Printers representing 250,000 printing companies AIFMP is the world's largest printers association.

== Booming sector ==
Currently printing sector is all set to become booming in India due to available technology, resource at a very economical cost. Also government is encouraging foreign direct investment into this sector. Lot of MNC's are expected to invest in this sector due to favourable working conditions. There are numerous jobs are expected in this industry due to overall growing percentage of 12% per annum. Worldwide, the annual revenue of the printing industry is over $600 Billion. The United States accounts the major share for over 25% of this business, at $160 billion a year.

== See also ==
- Book publishing in India
- Printing in Goa
