= Orient Paperback =

Indian publishing company

- Parent company: Vision Books Private Limited
- Status: Active
- Founded: 1975; 50 years ago
- Founder: D N Malhotra
- Country of origin: Indian
- Headquarters location: 5A/8, Ansari Road, 1st Floor, Daryaganj, New Delhi, India - 110 002
- Key people: Kapil Malhotra (President); Sidharth Malhotra (CEO); Sudhir Malhotra (MD)
- Publication types: Books
- Nonfiction topics: Fiction, Self-help; Academic
- Imprints: Orient Paperbacks; Vision Books; Caring Books
- Official website: orientpaperbacks.com

Orient Paperback is an Indian publishing company. It publishes academic books as well as fiction in English and Hindi languages. It has launched the literary careers of several unknown authors like R K Narayan, Mulk Raj Anand and Shakuntala Devi who went on to achieve fame.

== History ==
Orient Paperback was established in the year 1975 by Sudhir Malhotra and Kapil Malhotra. They are descendants of publisher Rajpal Malhotra who was assassinated in 1912 for publishing the controversial book "Rangeela Rasool". Rajpal's sons Vishwanath Malhotra and Dinanath Malhotra established Rajpal & Sons, which later got bifurcated into Orient Paperbacks and Hind Pocketbooks. In 1947, after the partition of India and Pakistan, the publishing house shifted to New Delhi. In 1976 Vishwananth's son Kapil Malhotra set up Vision Books as a private limited company with Orient Paperback as its official imprint. Currently Orient Paperback is a registered trademark of Vision Books.

== Publications and operations ==
The company publishes books under three different imprints. Fiction and travelogue under "Orient Paperbacks", general and self-help books under "Vision Books", and academic & career guidance are "Caring" imprint. Currently the company has more than 2000 titles distributed through around 1000 outlets. Its current CEO Sudhir Malhotra is also the President of the Federation of Indian Publishers.

Notable publications include books by Nelson Mandela, Sarvepalli Radhakrishnan, Imran Khan, Shakuntala Devi, Don Bradman, Mulk Raj Anand, R K Narayan. Orient Paperback also published the only book ever written by Indian Prime Minister Indira Gandhi.

== See also ==
- Publishers
- Rajpal & Sons
