= Kathashilpa Publishing House =

Kathashilpa (literally 'The Art of the Word') of 19 Shyamacharan De Street, Calcutta, 700073 (now Kolkata), was founded in 1959 by Abani Ranjan Ray (1932–2008) and friends, including Indranath Majumdar. It became a rendezvous of radical intellectuals and artists of Calcutta, including those with extreme left sympathies. It was active for more than thirty years.

== Founding and history ==
Abani Ranan Ray founded Kathashilpa in 1959 as a publishing company and a creative hub for various cultural activities, including drama and folk music. In the 1960s, it published three Bengali little magazines.

In the mid-1980s, Abani Ranjan Ray, assisted by Dhiren Ray, published a science monthly called Anwesha ("Search"). A special science fiction number of Anwesha carried translations of writers like Ray Bradbury, Richard Sheckley and Arthur C. Clarke. Anwesha also published special issues on the Indian Chemist Sir Prafulla Chandra Ray and the physicist and plant-physiologist Sir Jagadish Chandra Bose.

Kathashilpa published books encompassing a wide variety of genres.an Maiti)

In the 1990s, Kathashilpa gradually declined. The political and cultural atmosphere changed with the advent of globalization and the disappointment with leftism in general. Montu Da's health failed and eventually Kathashipa changed hands in 2006. Abani Ranjan Ray died shortly after, in 2008. The establishment, along with a semblance of its famous logo, is still at the same address, but in a new avatar.

== See also ==
- Naxalbari
- Naxalite
- The Emergency (India)
