= Book publishing in India =

Book publishing in India refers to the process of book creation within India, a growing field in recent years, which makes the country the sixth-largest book publishing nation in the world. While there is optimism about the growth of Indian publishing (especially in urban India), the sector is also afflicted by a lack of accurate figures about books published, knowledge shared and revenues earned. It is further divided between the local and multinational players, the English language and the local languages publishers. Self-publishing and immense free content, which is an offshoot of the digital revolution in print, further challenge the traditional ways of printing.

The major players in Academic Publishing are PHI Learning (formerly known as Prentice Hall of India), Wiley India, Taylor and Francis India, New Age International Publishers, Viva Books, TMH, Jaico and Manakin Press.

== Nielsen India study ==
One recent study on Indian publishing was the Nielsen India Book Market Report 2015: Understanding the India Book Market, which is priced, and has been described as a "study" or "survey". News reports emerging based on this report claim that India ranks in second place among all countries as an English-language print book publisher, that it has some "9000 publishers" and that over 70% of Indian publishers have "digitised their content to produce ebook versions". The Indian publishing industry has grown over time and in 2017 was estimated at US $6.7 billion.

== Problems of publishers ==
According to media reports based on the Nielsen India report, some problems and challenges faced by book publishers in India include:

- No direct investment from the government
- Publishing and bookselling having a "fragmented nature" in India.
- A "tortuous" distribution system.
- Long credit cycles.
- Difficulty to manage cash flows.
- Increased direct costs due to the above.
- Piracy and re-export of the low-priced editions to the first world markets.

== Technology in publishing ==
Technology has transformed the publishing industry since:

- The first wave of typesetting and printing, making the process relatively faster, easier and cheaper.
- Then the dissemination and outreach of information.
- Social media is taking it ahead by increasing visibility and discoverability.
- Online selling further closed the cycle (books account for 15% of ecommerce in the country, pegging growth at 20% annually).
- Additionally, mobile libraries and Walking BookFairs have taken libraries to the remote areas.

== ISBNs ==
ISBNs for books published in India are available free of cost from the Raja Rammohan Roy National Agency for ISBN, and since April 2016, online applications have to be made for the same. According to Kitaab.org "the agency claims to have issued ISBNs to 19,000 publishers since it was introduced in the country, in 1985." However, it adds that the application process for ISBNs in India is "fraught with challenges for many publishers, especially those based outside Delhi" due to the delays involved in getting ISBN numbers (of up to three months), which are considered essential in the book publishing process, and also some difficulties in following up on applications.

== Events related to publishing in India ==
- Publicon - The Business of Publishing has been a conference organised occasionally by the Ficci. It is slotted as an event meant for policy makers, authors, publishers, librarians, designers and illustrators, content creators, editors, self publishers, booksellers and distributors, bloggers, technology companies and social media marketers.
- Publishing Next is an industry event held over the past half-a-dozen years, mostly in Goa, and in 2016 in Kochi, Kerala.

== Areas for concern ==
- Corruption has been cited as prevalent in some government book procurement schemes for school and government libraries.
- Filling gaps in copyright awareness and publishing ethics.
- Challenges sprouted from digital revolution and fading reading habits.

== Data unavailable ==
While most market size figures are based on surveys or estimates, it can be difficult to get precise figures and statistics on:

- Exact number of published titles in India
- Number of publishing companies
- Number of bookshops and sales (including online sales)
- Translation flows or the number of published translations.

Business journalist Debashish Mukherji argues that "no one really knows" how big India's publication industry is, or how much revenue is being generated and by which publishers.

== See also ==
- List of book publishing houses in India
- Printing industry in India
- Printing in Goa
- Legal deposit: India
