= History of newspaper publishing =

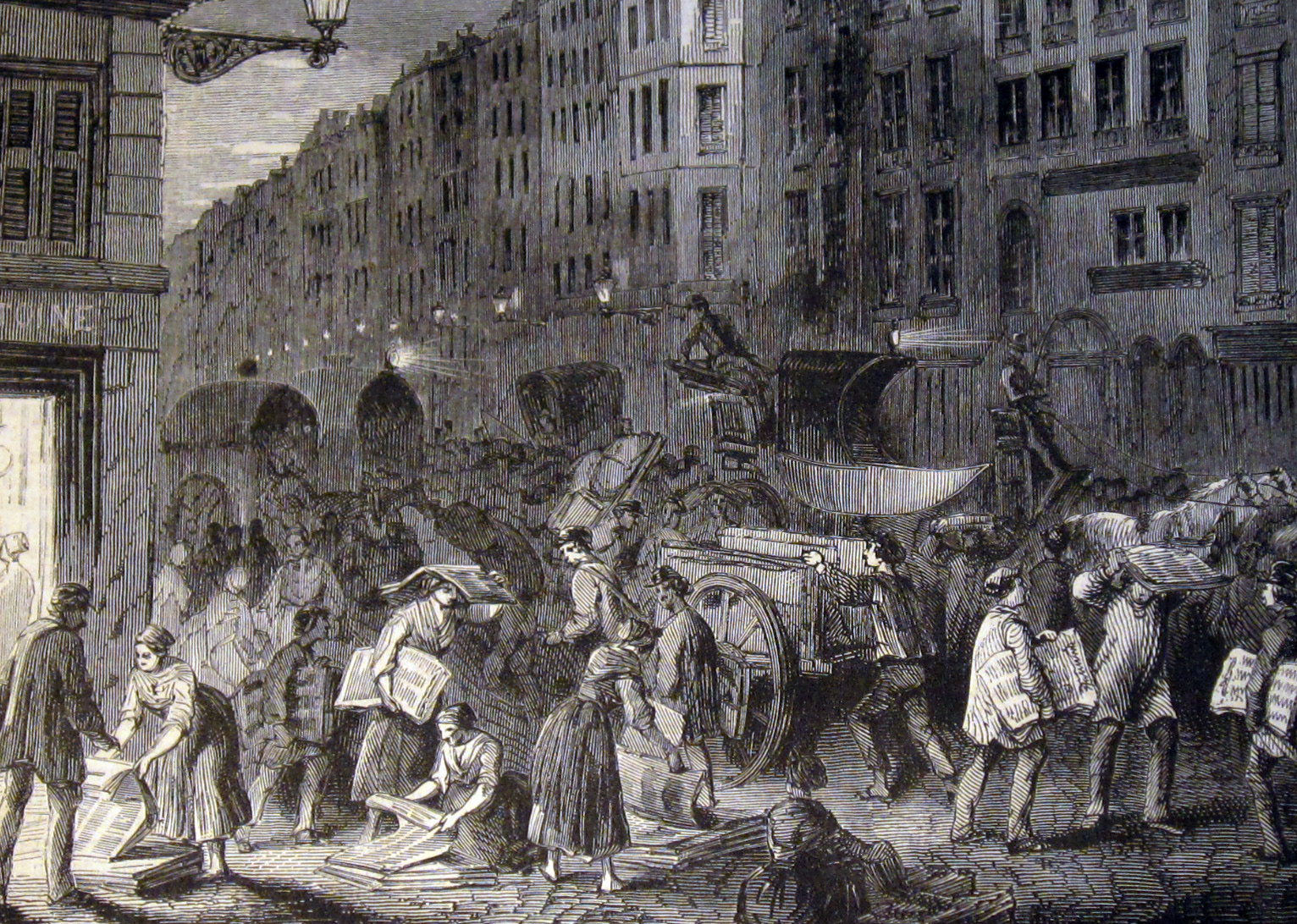
Newspaper being packed for delivery, Paris 1848

A newspaper is a periodical publication that covers a range of topics, provides up-to-date information, and is reasonably accessible to the general public. It is a European invention, although an early precursor dates to at least 713 CE in Imperial China. The oldest direct handwritten news sheets circulated widely in Venice as early as 1566. These weekly news sheets contained information on wars and politics in Italy and in Europe generally. The first printed newspapers were published weekly in Germany from 1605. Typically, they were censored by governments, especially in France, and reported mostly foreign news and current prices. After the English government relaxed censorship in 1695, newspapers flourished in London and a few other cities, including Boston and Philadelphia. By the 1830s, high-speed presses could print thousands of papers cheaply, allowing low daily costs.

== 16th century to 1800 ==
Avvisi, or gazettes, were a mid-16th-century Venice phenomenon. Issued weekly on single sheets and folded to form four pages, these publications reached a larger audience than handwritten news had in early Rome. Their format and appearance at regular intervals were two huge influences on the newspaper as we know it today. The idea of a weekly, handwritten newssheet went from Italy to Germany and then to Holland.

=== First newspapers ===
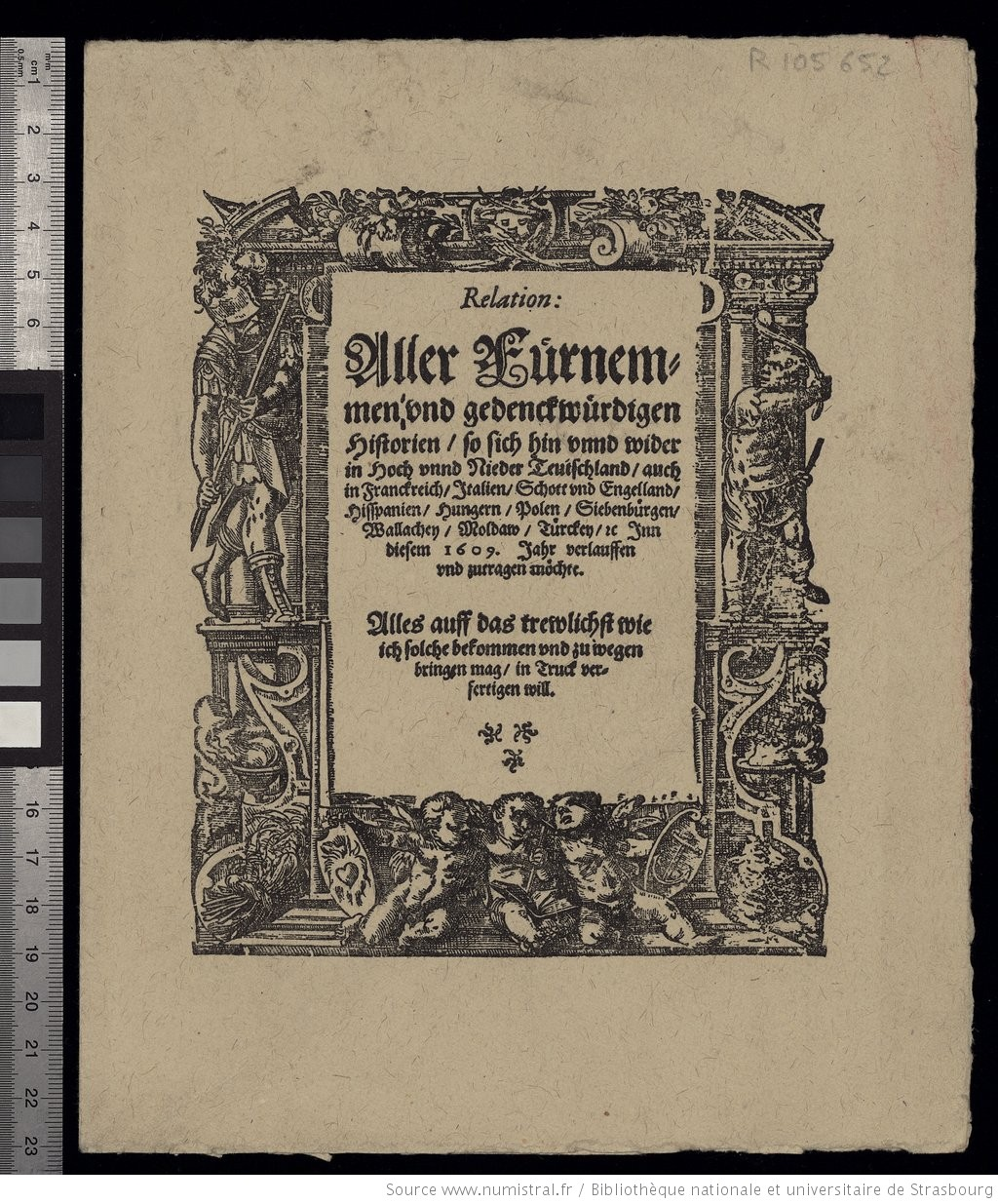
Title page (dated 1609) of Carolus' 1605 Relation, the first newspaper

The "periodical publication of news" developed as a distinct industry in early-17th century Europe, and the English-language term "newspaper" came into use by 1667. However, in Germany, publications that resemble newspaper publications appeared as early as the 16th century. They were discernibly newspapers for the following reasons: they were printed, dated, appeared at regular and frequent publication-intervals, and included a variety of news items (unlike single-item news mentioned above). Early forms of news periodicals were the so-called Messrelationen ("trade fair reports") compiled twice a year for the large annual book-fairs in Frankfurt and Leipzig, starting in the 1580s. Nevertheless, the German-language Relation aller Fürnemmen und gedenckwürdigen Historien, printed from 1605 onwards by Johann Carolus in Strasbourg, is often accepted as the first newspaper. The emergence of the new media branch stemmed from the spread of the printing press (mid-15th century onwards), from which the publishing press derives its name. Historian Johannes Weber writes: "At the same time, then, as the printing press in the physical, technological sense was invented, 'the press' in the extended sense of the word also entered the historical stage."

Other early papers include the Dutch Courante uyt Italien, Duytslandt, &c., founded by Caspar van Hilten in 1618. This Amsterdam-based newspaper was the first periodical to appear in folio- rather than quarto-size. As a center of world trade, Amsterdam quickly became home to many foreign-language newspapers originally styled in much the same way as Van Hilten's publication, and sometimes having a similar name in the tradition of proto-newspaper corantos.

In 1618, the Wöchentliche Zeitung aus mancherley Orten (Weekly news from many places) began to appear in Danzig (present-day Gdańsk) (the oldest newspaper in Prussia and the region of the Baltic Sea). Despite the title, it appeared irregularly, sometimes even three times a week.

The first English-language newspaper, Corrant out of Italy, Germany, etc., was published in Amsterdam in 1620. A year and a half later, Corante, or weekely newes from Italy, Germany, Hungary, Poland, Bohemia, France and the Low Countreys was published in England by an "N.B." (generally thought to be either Nathaniel Butter or Nicholas Bourne) and by Thomas Archer.

The first newspaper in France, La Gazette, originally appeared as Gazette de France from 1631.

The first newspaper in Portugal, Gazeta, em que se relatam as novas todas, que ouve nesta corte, e que vieram de várias partes no mês de novembro de 1641 (or A Gazeta da Restauração), was published in 1641 in Lisbon. The first Spanish newspaper, Gaceta de Madrid, appeared in 1661.

Post- och Inrikes Tidningar (founded as Ordinari Post Tijdender) began publication in Sweden in 1645; it remains the oldest newspaper still in existence, though it now publishes solely online.

Merkuriusz Polski Ordynaryjny was published in Kraków, Poland in 1661.

The first successful English daily, The Daily Courant, appeared from 1702 to 1735. Its first editor (for 10 days in March 1702) was Elizabeth Mallet, who for years had operated her late husband's printing establishment.

Early published news was highly selective of reported events and often propagandistic. Readers eagerly devoured sensationalism, such as accounts of magic, public executions and disasters; this material did not pose a threat to the authorities, because it did not pose criticism of the state.

=== German states ===
Although moveable type printing was invented in China, Germany (at the time the Holy Roman Empire of the German Nation) was the first European country to independently invent it, and the world's first newspapers were produced in the German states.

The 16th-century German financialist, Fugger, not only received business news from his correspondents, but also sensationalist and gossip news as well; it is evident in the correspondence of Fugger with his network that fiction and fact were both significant parts of early news publications. 16th century Germany also saw subscription-based, handwritten news. Those who subscribed to these publications were generally low-level government officials and also merchants. They could not afford other types of news publications, but had enough money to pay for a subscription, which was still expensive for the time.

In the 16th and 17th century, there appeared numerous printed news sheets summarizing accounts of battles, treaties, the king, epidemics, and special events. In 1605, Johann Carolus published the first regular newspaper in Straßburg, comprising brief news bulletins. The world's first daily newspaper appeared in 1650 in Leipzig. Later, Prussia increasingly became the largest and most dominant of the German states, but their newspapers were kept under tight control. Advertising was forbidden, and budgets were very small.

=== Italy ===
The first Italian gazettes appeared in the first half of the 17th century. Scholars suppose that the first newspaper printed in Italy was edited in Florence in 1636 by Amador Massi and Lorenzo Landi, but no issue was discovered to confirm that conjecture. The first Italian printed newspaper, Genova, was published in Genoa from 1639 to 1646. The issue dated 29 July 1639 is the oldest issue still in existence of a newspaper printed in Italy. Similar newspapers were published in Rome (1640), Milan and Bologna (Milano and Bologna, 1642), Torino (1645) and others. These newspapers - mainly four-page weeklies - had no special titles, the first page contained only the date and place of edition (with the only exceptions of Genoa Il Sincero edited by Luca Assarino and Gazetta edited by Castelli brothers). By the late 17th century, newspapers in the Papal States had become increasingly widespread, with nearly every town establishing its own local publication to meet the growing demand for news and information.

The first Italian literary magazines began appearing in the second half of the 17th century. The Giornale de' Letterati was published in Rome from 1668 to 1683, the Giornale veneto de' letterati in Venice during the years 1671–80 and 1687–90, and the Giornale de' letterati in Parma from 1686 to 1690 and in Modena from 1692 to 1697. In the 18th century, the Enlightenment culture of the North produced a significant number of journals edited by such well-known writers as Francesco Scipione Maffei (Osservazioni letterarie, Verona, 1737–1740), Giuseppe Baretti (La Frusta letteraria, Venice and Ancona, 1763–1765) and Girolamo Tiraboschi (Nuovo giornale de' letterati d'Italia, Modena, 1773–90). The more important reviews of the period, Gasparo Gozzi's Gazzetta veneta (1760–1762) and Pietro and Alessandro Verri's Il Caffè (1764–1766), were less literary and more socio-political in outlook.

=== Dutch Republic ===
One of the most distinctive features of Dutch 'corantos' is their format. It was in corantos that the highly illustrated German title page was replaced with a heading on the upper first page of the publication: the masthead, common in today's periodicals. In line with this more sober page layout, corantos show an optimal use of space for text. Dutch corantos had two text columns, which covered almost the whole page, unlike the previous German papers, which adopted a single text column with book-like margins. The more economical use of space is also reflected in the minimal indications of paragraphs and the absence of completely blank lines. Different messages were only highlighted with a heading in a slightly bigger type, which usually included the city or country from which the news had come down to the publisher. Another feature of the format of corantos was their size: they were the first newspapers to be issued in folio, instead of halfsheet. Another example of a coranto in this format, besides the Courante uyt Italien, Duytslandt, &c., is the Opregte Haarlemsche Courant. This Haarlem-based newspaper was first published in 1656 by Abraham Casteleyn and his wife Margaretha van Bancken, and still exists today, albeit in a tabloid format, rather than in the original folio.

=== British newspapers ===
On 7 November 1665, The London Gazette (at first called The Oxford Gazette) began publication. It decisively changed the look of English news printing, echoing the coranto format of two columns, a clear title, and a clear date. It was published twice a week. Other English papers started to publish three times a week, and later the first daily papers emerged.

The newspapers typically included short articles, ephemeral topics, some illustrations and service articles (classifieds). They were often written by multiple authors, although the authors' identities were often obscured. They began to contain some advertisements, and they did not yet include sections. Mass market papers emerged, including Sunday papers for workers to read in their leisure time. The Times adopted new technologies and set the standards for other newspapers. This newspaper covered major wars, among other major events.

=== North America ===
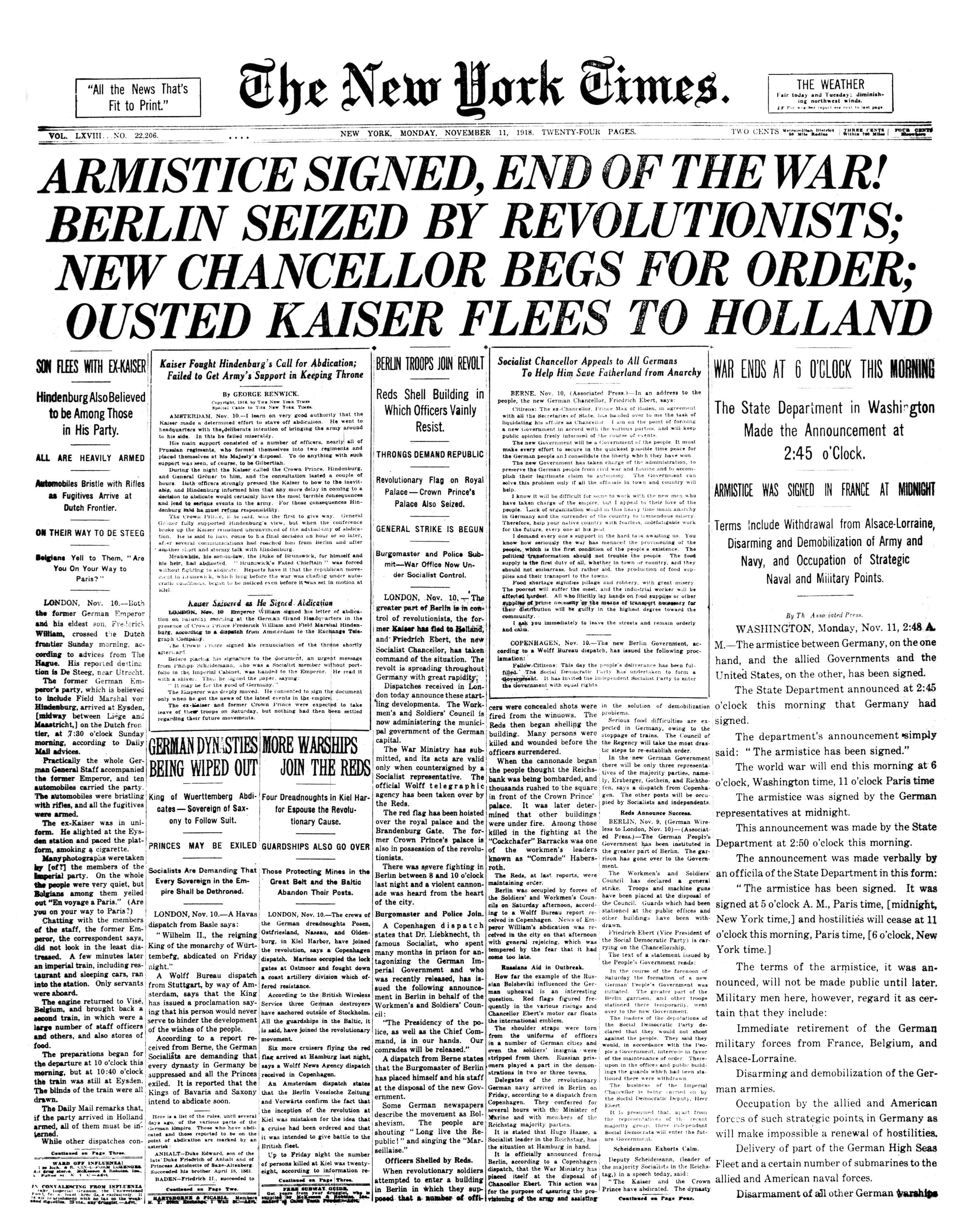
Front page of The New York Times on Armistice Day, November 11, 1918.

In Boston in 1690, Benjamin Harris published Publick Occurrences Both Forreign and Domestick. This is considered the first newspaper in the American colonies even though only one edition was published before the paper was suppressed by the colonial officials, possibly due to censorship and control issues. It followed the two-column format and was a single sheet, printed on both sides.

In 1704, the governor allowed The Boston News-Letter, a weekly, to be published, and it became the first continuously published newspaper in the colonies. Soon after, weekly papers began publishing in New York and Philadelphia. The second English-language newspaper in the Americas was the Weekly Jamaica Courant. These early newspapers followed the British format and were usually four pages long. They mostly carried news from Britain and content depended on the editor's interests. In 1783, the Pennsylvania Evening Post became the first American daily.

In 1751, John Bushell published the Halifax Gazette, the first Canadian newspaper.

=== India ===
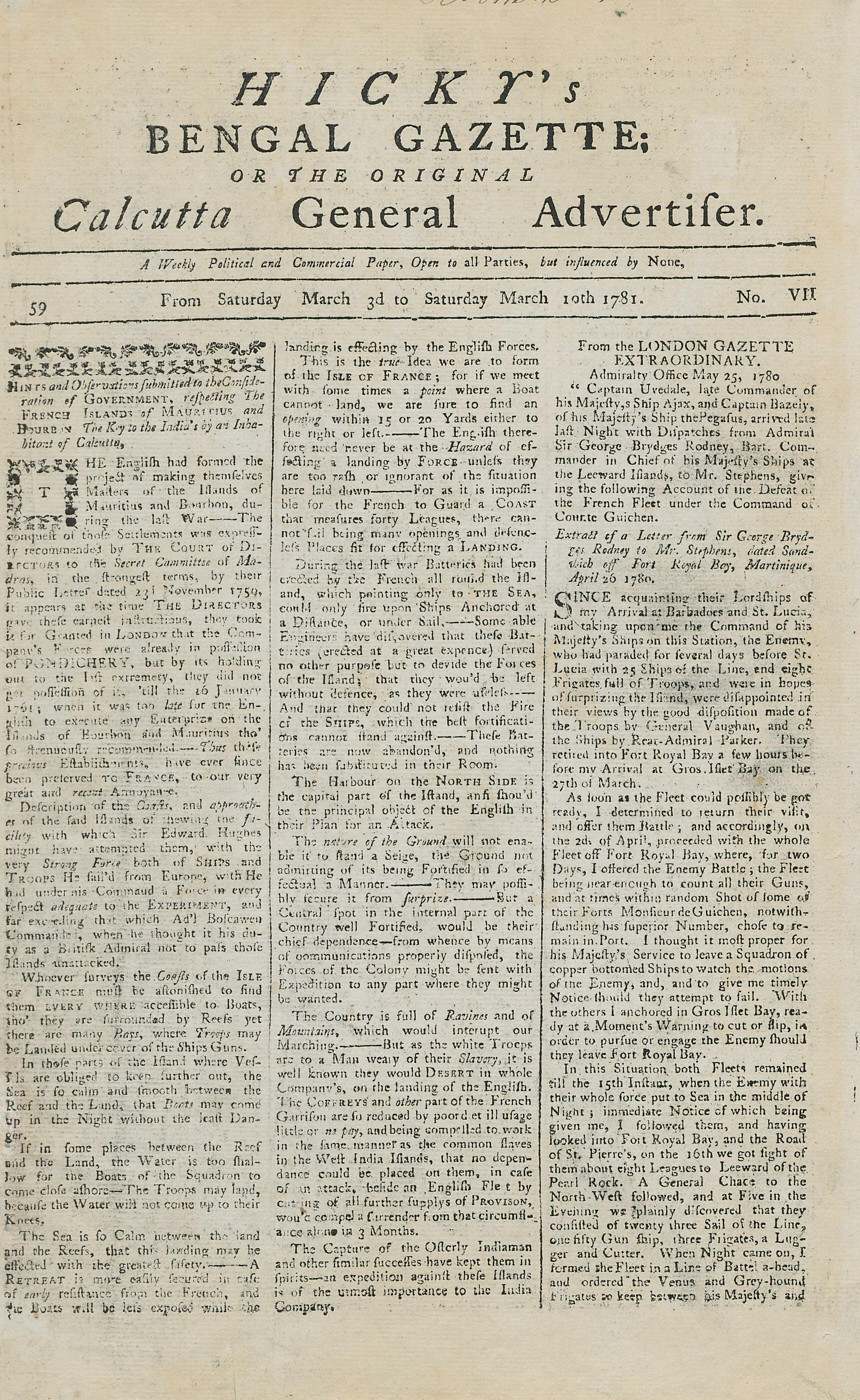
Front page of Hicky's Bengal Gazette, the first newspaper printed in Asia.

In 1766, a Dutch adventurer, William Bolts, proposed starting a newspaper for the English audience in Calcutta. He was deported by the East India Company, before his plans could come to fruition.

In January 1780, James Augustus Hicky published Hicky's Bengal Gazette, the first newspaper in India. The size of that four-page newspaper was 12"x8". Hicky accused the members of the East India Company, including Governor General Warren Hastings of corruption. In retaliation Hastings prohibited the post office from carrying Hicky's Bengal Gazette, and later sued Hicky for libel. In November 1780, the India Gazette appeared; it supported the Company government.

== Modern newspapers since 1800 ==
=== Technology ===
In 1814 The Times acquired a printing press capable of making 1,100 impressions per hour. It was soon adapted to print on both sides of a page at once. This innovation made newspapers cheaper and thus available to a larger part of the population. In 1830, the first penny press newspaper came to the market: Lynde M. Walter's Boston Transcript. Penny press papers cost about one-sixth the price of other newspapers and appealed to a wider audience. Newspaper editors exchanged copies and freely reprinted material. By the late 1840s, telegraph networks linked major and minor cities and permitted overnight news reporting. The invention of wood pulp papermaking in the 1840s significantly reduced the cost of newsprint, having previously been made from rags. Increasing literacy in the 19th century also increased the size of newspapers' audiences.

=== News agencies ===
Only a few large newspapers could afford bureaus outside their home city. They relied instead on news agencies, founded around 1859, especially Havas in France, the Associated Press in the United States, while Agenzia Stefani covered Italy. Former Havas employees founded Reuters in Britain and Wolff in Germany. Havas is now Agence France-Presse (AFP). For international news, the agencies pooled their resources, so that Havas, for example, covered the French Empire, South America and the Balkans and shared the news with the other national agencies. In France the typical contract with Havas provided a provincial newspaper with 1800 lines of telegraphed text daily, for an annual subscription rate of 10,000 francs. Other agencies provided features and fiction for their subscribers. The major news agencies have always operated on a basic philosophy of providing a single objective news feed to all subscribers. For example, they do not provide separate feeds for conservative or liberal newspapers. Fenby explains the philosophy:

to achieve such wide acceptability, the agencies avoid overt partiality. Demonstrably correct information is their stock in trade. Traditionally, they report at a reduced level of responsibility, attributing their information to a spokesman, the press, or other sources. They avoid making judgments and steer clear of doubt and ambiguity. Though their founders did not use the word, objectivity is the philosophical basis for their enterprises – or failing that, widely acceptable neutrality.

=== Britain ===
With literacy rising sharply, the rapidly growing demand for news, led to changes in the physical size, visual appeal, heavy use of war reporting, brisk writing style, and an omnipresent emphasis on speedy reporting thanks to the telegraph. London set the pace before 1870 but by the 1880s critics noted how London was echoing the emerging New York style of journalism. The new news writing style first spread to the provincial press through the Midland Daily Telegraph around 1900.

By the early 19th century, there were 52 London papers and over 100 other titles. In 1802, and 1815 the tax on newspapers was increased to three pence and then four pence. Unable or unwilling to pay this fee, between 1831 and 1835 hundreds of untaxed newspapers made their appearance. The political tone of most of them was fiercely revolutionary. Their publishers were prosecuted but this failed to get rid of them. It was chiefly Milner Gibson and Richard Cobden who advocated the case in parliament to first reduce in 1836 and in 1855 totally repeal of the tax on newspapers. After the reduction of the stamp tax in 1836 from four pence to one penny, the circulation of English newspapers rose from 39,000,000 to 122,000,000 by 1854; a trend further exacerbated by technological improvements in rail transportation and telegraphic communication combined with growing literacy.

==== The Times ====
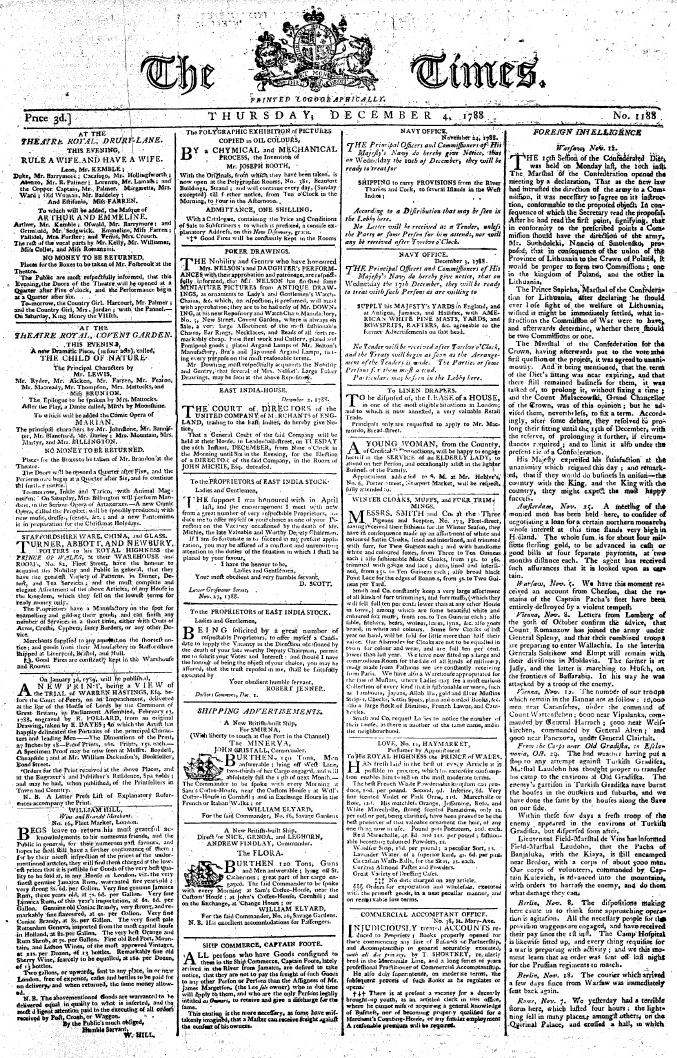
Front page 4 December 1788

The paper began in 1785 and in 1788 was renamed The Times. In 1817, Thomas Barnes was appointed general editor; he was a political radical, a sharp critic of parliamentary hypocrisy and a champion of freedom of the press. Under Barnes and his successor in 1841, John Thadeus Delane, the influence of The Times rose to great heights, especially in politics and amongst the City of London. It spoke for reform. Peter Fraser and Edward Sterling were two noted journalists, and gained for The Times the pompous/satirical nickname 'The Thunderer' (from "We thundered out the other day an article on social and political reform.") The paper was the first in the world to reach mass circulation due to its early adoption of the steam-driven rotary printing press. It was also the first properly national newspaper, as it was distributed via the new steam railways to rapidly growing concentrations of urban populations across the country. This helped ensure the profitability of the paper and its growing influence.

The Times was the first newspaper to send war correspondents to cover wars. W. H. Russell, the paper's correspondent with the army in the Crimean War of the mid-1850s, wrote immensely influential dispatches; for the first time the public could read about the reality of warfare. In particular, on September 20, 1854, Russell wrote a missive about one battle that highlighted the surgeons' "humane barbarity" and the lack of ambulance care for wounded troops. Shocked and outraged, the public's backlash led to major reforms. The Times became famous for its influential leaders (editorials). For example, Robert Lowe wrote them between 1851 and 1868 on a wide range of economic topics such as free trade (which he favored).

Allan Nevins, the historian of journalism, in 1959 analyzed the importance of The Times in shaping views:

For much more than a century The Times has been an integral and important part of the political structure of Great Britain. Its news and its editorial comment have in general been carefully coordinated, and have at most times been handled with an earnest sense of responsibility. While the paper has admitted some trivia to its columns, its whole emphasis has been on important public affairs treated with an eye to the best interests of Britain. To guide this treatment, the editors have for long periods been in close touch with 10 Downing Street.

==== Other main papers ====
The Manchester Guardian was founded in Manchester in 1821 by a group of non-conformist businessmen. Its most famous editor, Charles Prestwich Scott, made the Guardian into a world-famous newspaper in the 1890s.

The Daily Telegraph began on June 29, 1855, and was bought by Joseph Moses Levy the next year. Levy produced it as the first penny newspaper in London. His son, Edward Lawson soon became editor, a post he held until 1885. It became a gauge of middle class opinion and could claim the largest circulation in the world in 1890. It backed the Liberal Party's mainstream views until opposing what became the party's decades-long Gladstonian, largely consensual foreign policy in 1878. It turned Unionist.

==== New Journalism of the 1890s ====
The New Journalism reached out not to the elite but to a popular audience. Especially influential was William Thomas Stead, a controversial journalist and editor who pioneered the art of investigative journalism. Stead's 'new journalism' paved the way for the modern tabloid. He was influential in demonstrating how the press could be used to influence public opinion and government policy, and advocated "government by journalism". He was also well known for his reportage on child welfare, social legislation and reformation of England's criminal codes.

Stead became assistant editor of the Liberal Pall Mall Gazette in 1880 where he set about revolutionizing a traditionally conservative newspaper "written by gentlemen for gentlemen". Over the next seven years Stead would develop what Matthew Arnold dubbed 'The New Journalism'. His innovations as editor of the Gazette included incorporating maps and diagrams into a newspaper for the first time, breaking up longer articles with eye-catching subheadings and blending his own opinions with those of the people he interviewed. He made a feature of the Pall Mall extras, and his enterprise and originality exercised a potent influence on contemporary journalism and politics. Stead introduced the interview, creating a new dimension in British journalism when he interviewed General Gordon in 1884. He originated the modern journalistic technique of creating a news event rather than just reporting it, with his most famous 'investigation', the Eliza Armstrong case.

Arnold, a leading critic, declared in 1887 that the New Journalism, "is full of ability, novelty, variety, sensation, sympathy, generous instincts". However, he added, its "one great fault is that it is feather-brained".

==== Northcliffe's revolution ====
The turn of the century saw the rise of popular journalism. These are papers aimed at the lower to lower-middle income earners demoting minutely reasoned news and analysis, which remain the focus of party- or ideology-oriented newspapers. Instead the papers are inclusive by emphasis on sports, crime, sensationalism and gossip about celebrities. Alfred Harmsworth, 1st Viscount Northcliffe (1865–1922) was the chief innovator. He used his Daily Mail and the Daily Mirror to transform the media along the American model of "Yellow Journalism". Lord Beaverbrook said he was "the greatest figure who ever strode down Fleet Street". P. P. Catterall and Colin Seymour-Ure conclude that:

More than anyone [he] ... shaped the modern press. Developments he introduced or harnessed remain central: broad contents, exploitation of advertising revenue to subsidize prices, aggressive marketing, subordinate regional markets, independence from party control.

==== Interwar Britain ====
After the war, the major newspapers engaged in a large-scale circulation race. The political parties, which long had sponsored their own papers, could not keep up, and one after another their outlets were sold or closed down. Sales in the millions depended on popular stories, with a strong human interesting theme, as well as detailed sports reports with the latest scores. Serious news was a niche market and added very little to the circulation base. The niche was dominated by The Times and, to a lesser extent, The Daily Telegraph. Consolidation was rampant, as local dailies were bought up and added to chains based in London. James Curran and Jean Seaton report:

after the death of Lord Northcliffe in 1922, four men–Lords Beaverbrook (1879–1964), Rothermere (1868–1940), Camrose (1879–1954) and Kemsley (1883–1968)–became the dominant figures in the inter-war press. In 1937, for instance, they owned nearly one in every two national and local daily papers sold in Britain, as well as one in every three Sunday papers that were sold. The combined circulation of all their newspapers amounted to over thirteen million.

The Times of London was long the most influential prestige newspaper, although far from having the largest circulation. It gave far more attention to serious political and cultural news. In 1922, John Jacob Astor (1886–1971), son of the 1st Viscount Astor (1849–1919), bought The Times from the Northcliffe estate. The paper advocated appeasement of Hitler's demands. Its editor Geoffrey Dawson was closely allied with Prime Minister Neville Chamberlain, and pushed hard for the Munich Agreement in 1938. Candid news reports by Norman Ebbut from Berlin that warned of warmongering were rewritten in London to support the appeasement policy. In March 1939, however, it reversed course and called for urgent war preparations.

=== Denmark ===
Danish news media date back to the 1540s, when handwritten fly sheets reported on the news. In 1666, Anders Bording, the father of Danish journalism, began a state paper. The royal privilege to bring out a newspaper was issued to Joachim Wielandt in 1720. University officials handled the censorship, but in 1770 Denmark became one of the first nations of the world to provide for press freedom; it ended in 1799. In 1834, the first liberal newspaper appeared, one that gave much more emphasis to actual news content rather than opinions. The newspapers championed the Revolution of 1848 in Denmark. The new constitution of 1849 liberated the Danish press.

Newspapers flourished in the second half of the 19th century, usually tied to one or another political party or labor union. Modernization, bringing in new features and mechanical techniques, appeared after 1900. The total circulation was 500,000 daily in 1901, more than doubling to 1.2 million in 1925. The German occupation brought informal censorship; some offending newspaper buildings were simply blown up by the Nazis. During the war, the underground produced 550 newspapers—small, surreptitiously printed sheets that encouraged sabotage and resistance.

Today Danish mass media and news programming are dominated by a few large corporations. In printed media JP/Politikens Hus and Berlingske Media, between them, control the largest newspapers Politiken, Berlingske Tidende and Jyllands-Posten and major tabloids B.T. and Ekstra Bladet.

In the early 21st century, the 32 daily newspapers had a combined circulation of over 1 million. The largest was Jyllands-Posten (JP) with a circulation of 120,000. It gained international attention in 2005 by publishing cartoons critical of the Islamic prophet Muhammad. Militant Muslims protested around the world, burning Denmark's embassies in Beirut and Damascus. There have been threats and attempted terrorist plots against the newspaper and its employees ever since.

=== France ===
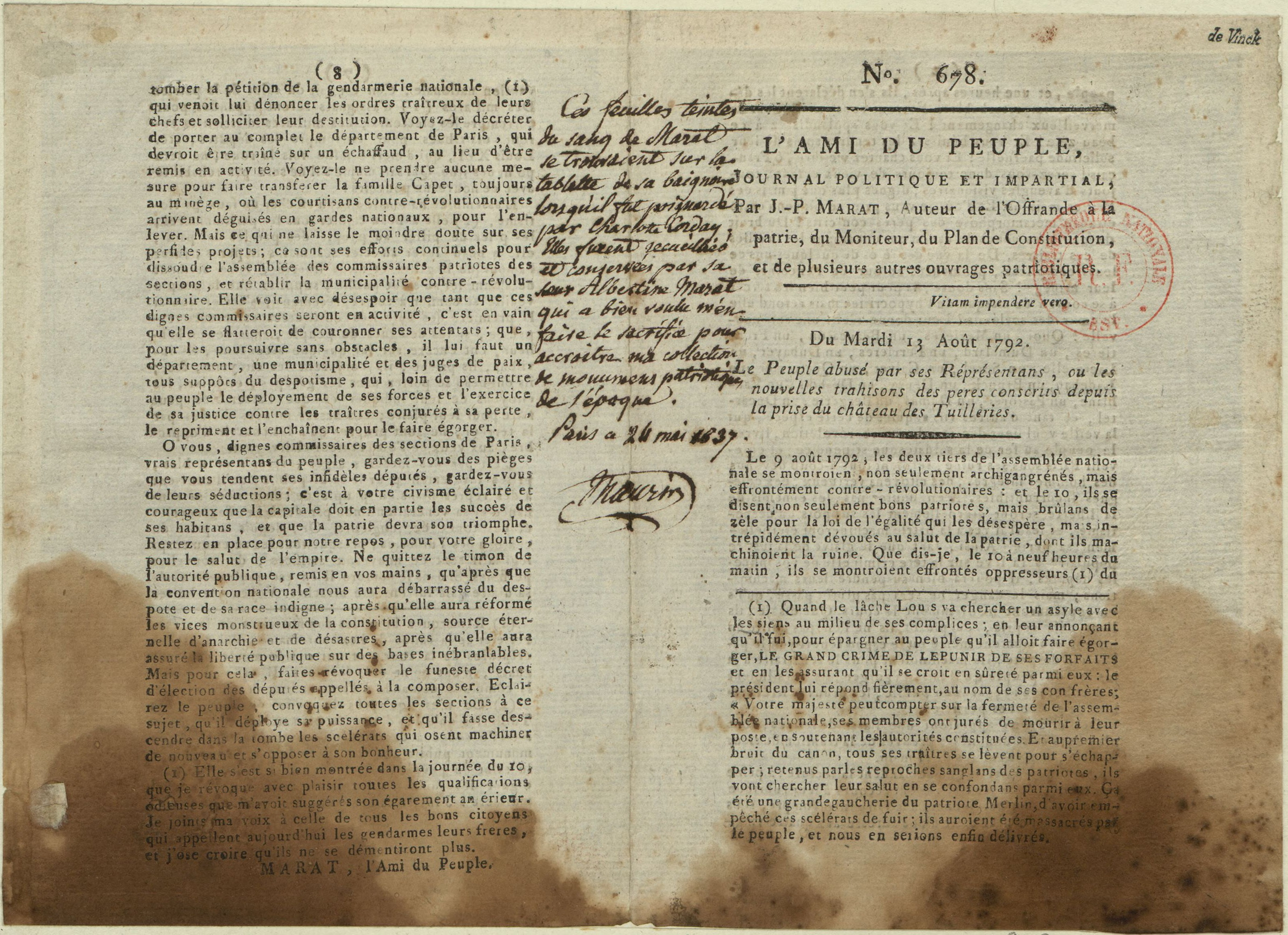
A copy of L'Ami du peuple stained with the blood of Marat

In the Ancien Régime there were a small number of heavily censored newspapers that needed a royal license to operate. The first newspaper was the Gazette de France, established in 1632 by the king's physician Theophrastus Renaudot (1586–1653), with the patronage of Louis XIII. All newspapers were subject to prepublication censorship, and served as instruments of propaganda for the monarchy. Dissidents used satire and hidden meanings to spread their political criticism.

Newspapers and pamphlets played role in The Enlightenment in France and they played a central role in stimulating and defining the Revolution. The meetings of the Estates-General in 1789 created an enormous demand for news, and over 130 newspapers appeared by the end of the year. The next decade saw 2000 newspapers founded, with 500 in Paris alone. Most lasted only a matter of weeks. Together they became the main communication medium, combined with the very large pamphlet literature. Newspapers were read aloud in taverns and clubs, and circulated hand to hand. The press saw its lofty role to be the advancement of civic republicanism based on public service, and downplayed the liberal, individualistic goal of making a profit. In the Revolution the radicals were most active but the royalists flooded the country with their press the "Ami du Roi" (Friends of the King) until they were suppressed. Napoleon only allowed one newspaper in each department and four in Paris, all under tight control.

In the revolutionary days of 1848, former Saint-Simoniennes founded a Club for the Emancipation of Women; in 1848, it changed its name to La Société de la Voix des Femmes (Society for Women's Voice) in line with its new newspaper, La Voix des Femmes. It was France's first feminist daily and proclaimed itself "a socialist and political journal, the organ of the interests of all women". It lasted for only a few weeks as did two other feminist newspapers; women occasionally contributed articles to the magazines, often under a pseudonym.

The democratic political structure of France in 1870–1914 was supported by the proliferation of newspapers. The circulation of the daily press in Paris went from 1 million in 1870 to 5 million in 1910; it then leveled off and reached 6 million in 1939. Advertising grew rapidly, providing a steady financial basis. A new liberal press law of 1881 abandoned the restrictive practices that had been typical for a century. High-speed rotary Hoe presses, introduced in the 1860s, facilitated quick turnaround time and cheaper publication. New types of popular newspapers, especially Le Petit Journal reached an audience more interested in diverse entertainment and gossip rather than hard news. It captured a quarter of the Parisian market, and forced the rest to lower their prices. The main dailies employed their own journalists who competed for news flashes. All newspapers relied upon the Agence Havas (now Agence France-Presse), a telegraphic news service with a network of reporters and contracts with Reuters to provide world service. The staid old papers retained their loyal clientele because of their concentration on serious political issues.

The Roman Catholic Assumptionist order revolutionized pressure group media by its national newspaper La Croix. It vigorously advocated for traditional Catholicism while at the same time innovating with the most modern technology and distribution systems, with regional editions tailored to local taste. Secularists and Republicans recognize the newspaper as their greatest enemy, especially when it took the lead in attacking Dreyfus as a traitor and stirred up anti-Semitism. When Dreyfus was pardoned, the Radical government in 1900 closed down the entire Assumptionist order and its newspaper.

==== Corruption ====
Businesses and banks secretly paid certain newspapers to promote particular financial interests, and hide or cover up possible misbehavior. Publishers took payments for favorable notices in news articles of commercial products. Sometimes, a newspaper would blackmail a business by threatening to publish unfavorable information unless the business immediately started advertising in the paper. Foreign governments, especially Russia and Turkey, secretly paid the press hundreds of thousands of francs a year to guarantee favorable coverage of the bonds it was selling in Paris. When the real news was bad about Russia, as during its 1905 Revolution or during its war with Japan, it raised the bribes it paid to millions of francs. Each ministry in Paris had a group of journalists whom it secretly paid and fed stories. During the World War, newspapers became more of a propaganda agency on behalf of the war effort; there was little critical commentary. The press seldom reported the achievements of the Allies; instead they credited all the good news to the French army. In a word, the newspapers were not independent champions of the truth, but secretly paid advertisements for special interests and foreign governments.

==== First World War ====
The World War ended a golden era for the press. Their younger staff members were drafted and male replacements could not be found (women were not considered available) Rail transportation was rationed and less paper and ink came in, and fewer copies could be shipped out. Inflation raised the price of newsprint, which was always in short supply. The cover price went up, circulation fell and many of the 242 dailies published outside Paris closed down. The government set up the Interministerial Press Commission to closely supervise the press. A separate agency imposed tight censorship that led to blank spaces where news reports or editorials were disallowed. The dailies sometimes were limited to only two pages instead of the usual four, leading one satirical paper to try to report the war news in the same spirit:

War News. A half-zeppelin threw half its bombs on half-time combatants, resulting in one-quarter damaged. The zeppelin, halfways-attacked by a portion of half-anti aircraft guns, was half destroyed.

==== Postwar stagnation ====
The Parisian newspapers were largely stagnant after 1914. The major postwar success story was Paris Soir; which lacked any political agenda and was dedicated to providing a mix of sensational reporting to aid circulation, and serious articles to build prestige. By 1939, its circulation was over 1.7 million, double that of its nearest rival the tabloid Le Petit Parisien. In addition to its daily paper Paris Soir sponsored a highly successful women's magazine Marie-Claire. Another magazine Match was modeled after the photojournalism of the American magazine Life.

France was a democratic society in the 1930s, but the people were kept in the dark about critical issues of foreign policy. The government tightly controlled all of the media to promulgate propaganda to support the government's foreign policy of appeasement to the aggressions of Italy and especially Nazi Germany. There were 253 daily newspapers, all owned separately. The five major national papers based in Paris were all under the control of special interests, especially right-wing political and business interests that supported appeasement. They were all venal, taking large secret subsidies to promote the policies of various special interests. Many leading journalists were secretly on the government payroll. The regional and local newspapers were heavily dependent on government advertising and published news and editorials to suit Paris. Most of the international news was distributed through the Havas agency, which was largely controlled by the government. The goal was to tranquilize public opinion, to give it little or nothing to work with, so as not to interfere with the policies of the national government. When serious crises emerged such as the Munich crisis of 1938, people were puzzled and mystified by what was going on. When war came in 1939, the French people had little understanding of the issues, and little correct information. They suspiciously distrusted the government, with the result that French morale in the face of the war with Germany was badly prepared.

In 1942, the occupying German forces took control of all of the Parisian newspapers and operated them with collaborators. In 1944, the Free French liberated Paris, and seized control of all of the collaborationist newspapers. They turned the presses and operations over to new teams of editors and publishers, and provided financial support. Thus for example The previously high-prestige Le Temps was replaced by the new daily Le Monde.

In the early 21st century, the best-selling daily was the regional Ouest-France in 47 local editions, followed by Le Progres of Lyon, La Voix du Nord in Lille, and Provençal in Marseille. In Paris the Communists published l'Humanite, while Le Monde and Figaro had local rivals in Le Parisien and the leftist Libération.

=== Germany ===
The Germans read more newspapers than anyone else. The most dramatic advance in quality came in 1780, with the Neue Zürcher Zeitung in Zürich, Switzerland. It set a new standard in objective, in-depth treatment of serious news stories, combined with high-level editorials, and in-depth coverage of music in the theater, as well as an advertising section. Its standards were emulated by the Norddeutsche Allgemeine Zeitung (1861–1945) and the Frankfurter Zeitung (1856–1943), among others.

Napoleon shut down existing German newspapers when he marched through, replacing them with his own, which echoed the official Parisian press. The upsurge of German nationalism after 1809 stimulated underground newspapers, calling for resistance to Napoleon. Johann Palm took the lead in Augsburg, but he was caught and executed. With the downfall of Napoleon, reactionaries came to power across Germany who had no tolerance for a free press. A repressive police system guaranteed that newspapers would not be criticizing the government.

The revolution of 1848 saw the overnight emergence of a liberal press demanding new freedoms, new constitutions and a free press. Multiple parties formed, and each had its own newspaper network. Neue Rheinische Zeitung was the first socialist newspaper; it appeared in 1848–49, with Karl Marx as editor. The Revolution of 1848 failed in Germany, the reactionaries returned to power, and many liberal and radical journalists fled the country. The Neue Preussische Zeitung (or Kreuz-Zeitung) became the organ of the Junker East Elbian landowners, the Lutheran clergy, and influential civil and military officials who upheld the King of Prussia. It became the leading Prussian conservative newspaper. Its slogan was "With God for king and fatherland."

Berlin, the capital of Prussia, had the reputation of being "the newspaper city" ("Zeitungstadt"); it published 32 dailies in 1862, along with 58 weekly newspapers. The main emphasis was not on news are reporting, but among commentary and political analysis. None of the newspapers, however, and none of their editors or journalists, was especially influential. However some were using their newspaper experience as a stepping stone to a political career. The audience was limited to about 5% of the adult men, chiefly from the upper and middle classes, who followed politics. Liberal papers outnumbered conservative ones by a wide margin.

Bismarck's leadership in Prussia in the 1860s, and after 1871 in the German Empire, was highly controversial. His position on domestic policies was conservative or reactionary, and newspapers were mostly liberal; they attacked his defiance of the elected assembly. However, his success in wars against Denmark, Austria, and France made him highly popular, and his establishment of the German Empire was a dream come true for German nationalists. Bismarck kept a tight rein on the press. Bismarck never listened to public opinion, but he did try to shape it. He secretly subsidized newspapers, and the government gave financial help to small local papers, guaranteeing an overall favorable view. The press law of 1874 guaranteed press freedom, of a sort, but allowed for suppression if an issue contained "provocation to treason, incitement to violence, offense to the sovereign, or encouraged assistance of the government". Bismarck often used the code to threaten editors. The press law of 1878 suspended any newspaper advocating socialism – a club Bismarck used to suppress the rapidly growing socialist political movement. He also set up several official propaganda bureaus that distributed foreign and national news to local newspapers.

The newspapers primarily featured lengthy discussions and editorials regarding political conditions. They also included a "Unter dem Strich" ("Below the line") section that featured short stories, poetry, critical reviews of new books, evaluations of art exhibits, and reports on musical concerts and new plays. An especially popular feature was a novel, serialized with a new chapter every week. In many ways more influential than the newspapers were the magazines, which proliferated after 1870. Eminent intellectuals favored this medium. By 1890, Berlin published over 600 weeklies, biweeklies, monthlies, and quarterlies, including scholarly journals that were essential reading for scientists everywhere.

==== 20th century ====
When high-speed rotary presses became available, together with typesetting machinery, it became possible to have press runs in the hundreds of thousands, with frequent updates throughout the day. By 1912, there were 4000 newspapers, printing 5 to 6,000,000,000 copies of the year. New technology made illustrations more feasible, and photographs began appearing. Advertising was now an important feature. Nevertheless, all newspapers focused on their own city, and there was no national newspaper of the sort that flourished in Britain, nor chains owned by one company such as those becoming common in the United States. All the political parties relied heavily on their own newspapers to inform and rally their supporters. For example, there were 870 papers in 1912 pitched to conservative readers, 580 aimed at liberal elements, 480 aimed at the Roman Catholics of the Centre party, and 90 affiliated with the Socialist party.

The first German newspaper aimed at a mass audience was the Berliner Morgenpost, founded in 1898 by publisher Hermann Ullstein. It focused on local news, with very thorough coverage of its home city, ranging from the palaces to the tenements, along with lists of sporting events, streetcar schedules and shopping tips. By 1900, it reached 200,000 subscribers. A rival appeared in 1904, the BZ am Mittag, with a flair for the spectacular and sensational in city life, especially fires, crime and criminals.

During the First World War (1914–1918), Germany published several newspapers and magazines for the enemy areas it occupied. The Gazette des Ardennes was designed for French readers in Belgium and France, Francophone prisoners of war, and generally as a propaganda vehicle in neutral and even enemy countries. Editor Fritz H. Schnitzer had a relatively free hand, and he tried to enhance his credibility by factual information. He realized until the closing days of the war that it was necessary to produce an increasingly optimistic report to hide the weakening position of the Central Powers in the summer and fall of 1918.

The Nazis (in power 1933–1945) exercised total control over the press under the direction of Joseph Goebbels. He took control of the wire services and shut down 1000 of the 3000 newspapers, including all those operated by the socialist, communist, and Roman Catholic movements. The survivors received about two dozen press directives every week, which typically were followed very closely.

In 1945, the occupying powers took over all newspapers in Germany and purged them of Nazi influence. Each of the four zones had one newspaper: Die Welt in Hamburg, the British zone; Die Neue Zeitung in Munich in the American zone; and Tägliche Rundschau (1945–1955) in East Berlin in the Soviet zone. By 1949, there were 170 licensed newspapers, but newsprint was strictly rationed, and circulation remains small. The American occupation headquarters, the Office of Military Government, United States (OMGUS) began its own newspaper based in Munich, Die Neue Zeitung. It was edited by German and Jewish émigrés who fled to the United States before the war, and reached a circulation of 1.6 million in 1946. Its mission was to encourage democracy by exposing Germans to how American culture operated. The paper was filled with details on American sports, politics, business, Hollywood, and fashions, as well as international affairs.

In the early 21st century, 78% of the population regularly read one of Germany's 1200 newspapers, most of which are now online. The heavily illustrated tabloid Bild had the largest circulation in Europe, at 2.5 million copies a day. It is published by Axel Springer AG, which has a chain of newspapers. Today, the conservative leaning Frankfurter Allgemeine Zeitung (FAZ) has the highest reputation; its main competitors are the left-wing Süddeutsche Zeitung (Munich) and liberal-conservative Die Welt. Influential weekly opinion papers include Die Zeit, and until it closed in 2010, Rheinischer Merkur.

=== Italy ===
Between oppressive rulers, and a low rate of literacy, Italy had little in the way of a serious newspaper press for the 1840s. Gazzetta del Popolo (1848–1983) based in turn was the leading voice for an Italian unification. La Stampa (1867–present) in Turin competes with Corriere della Sera of Milan for primacy in Italian journalism, in terms of circulation numbers and depth of coverage. It was a strong supporter of Prime Minister Giovanni Giolitti, who was denounced daily by Corriere della Sera.

The major newspapers were served by Agenzia Stefani (1853–1945). It was a News agency that collected news and feature items, and distributed them to subscribing newspapers by telegraph or by mail. It had exchange agreements with Reuters in London and Havas in Paris, and provided a steady flow of domestic and international news and features.

The series of crises and confrontations between the papacy and the kingdom of Italy in the 1870s focused especially on the question of who would control Rome, and what place the pope would have in the new Kingdom. A network of pro-papal newspapers in Italy vigorously supported papal rights and help mobilize the Catholic element.

==== 20th century ====
In 1901, Alberto Bergamini, editor of Rome's Il Giornale d'Italia created the "la Terza Pagina" ("Third Page"), featuring essays in literature, philosophy, criticism, the arts, and politics. It was quickly emulated by the upscale press. The most important newspaper was the liberal Corriere della Sera, founded in Milan in 1876. It reached a circulation of over 1 million under editor and co-owner Luigi Albertini (1900–1925). Albertini deliberately modeled his paper after the Times of London, where he had worked briefly. He commissioned leading liberal intellectuals to write essays. Albertini was a strong opponent of Socialism, of clericalism, and of Prime Minister Giovanni Giolitti who was willing to compromise with those forces and corrupt Italian politics. Albertini's opposition to the Fascist regime forced the other co-owners to oust him in 1925.

Mussolini was a former editor; his Fascist regime (1922–1943) took full control of the media in 1925. Opposition Journalists were physically maltreated; two thirds of the dailies were shut down. An underground press was developed, using smuggled material. All the major papers had been mouthpieces for a political party; now all parties save one were abolished, and the newspapers all became its mouthpiece. In 1924, the fascists took control of Agenzia Stefani, and enlarged its scope and mission to make it their tool to control the news content in all of Italy's newspapers. By 1939, it operated 32 bureaus inside Italy and 16 abroad, with 261 correspondents in Italy and 65 abroad. Every day they processed over 1200 dispatches, from which Italian newspapers made up their news pages.

== Latin America ==
British influence extended globally through its colonies and its informal business relationships with merchants in major cities. They needed up-to-date market and political information. El Seminario Republicano was the first non-official newspaper; it appeared in Chile in 1813. El Mercurio was founded in Valparaiso, Chile, in 1827. The most influential newspaper in Peru, El Comercio, first appeared in 1839. The Jornal do Commercio was established in Rio de Janeiro, Brazil, in 1827. Much later Argentina founded its newspapers in Buenos Aires: La Prensa in 1869 and La Nación in 1870.

== Asia ==
=== China ===
In China, early government-produced news sheets, called tipao, were commonly used among court officials during the late Han dynasty (2nd and 3rd centuries AD). Between 713 and 734, the Kaiyuan Za Bao ("Bulletin of the Court") of the Tang dynasty published government news; it was handwritten on silk and read by government officials. In 1582, privately published news sheets appeared in Beijing, during the late Ming dynasty.

Shen Bao

From the late 19th century until 1949 the international community at Shanghai and Hong Kong sponsored a lively foreign language press that covered business and political news. Leaders included North China Daily News, Shanghai Evening Post and Mercury, and for Germans, Der Ostasiatischer Lloyd, and Deutsche Shanghai Zeitung. Before 1872, government gazettes printed occasional announcements by officials. In Shanghai English businessman Ernest Major (1841–1908) established the first Chinese language newspaper in 1872. His Shen Bao employed Chinese editors and journalists and purchased stories by Chinese writers; it also published letters from readers. Serialized novels were popular with readers and kept them loyal; to the paper. Shanghai's large and powerful International Settlement stimulated the growth of a public sphere of Chinese men of affairs who paid close attention to political and economic developments. Shanghai became China's media capital. Shen Bao was the most important Chinese-language newspaper until 1905 and was still important until the communists came to power 1949.

Shen bao and other major newspapers saw public opinion as the driving force of historical change, of the sort that would bring progress reason and modernity to China. The editors portrayed public opinion as the final arbiter of justice for government officials. Thereby they broadened the public sphere to include the readership. The encouragement of the formation of public opinion stimulated activism and form the basis for popular support for the 1911 revolution. Chinese newspaper journalism was modernized in the 1920s according to international standards, thanks to the influence of the New Culture Movement. The roles of journalist and editor were professionalized and became prestigious careers. The Ta Kung Pao expanded audiences with its impartial reporting on public affairs. The business side gained importance and with a greater emphasis on advertising and commercial news, the main papers, especially in Shanghai, moved away from the advocacy journalism that characterized the 1911 revolutionary period. Outside the main centers the nationalism promoted in metropolitan dailies was not as distinctive as localism and culturalism.

Today China has two news agencies, the Xinhua News Agency and the China News Service (Zhongguo Xinwenshe). Xinhua was the major source of news and photographs for central and local newspapers. In 2002, there were 2100 newspapers, compared to only 400 in 1980. The party's newspapers People's Daily and Guangming Daily, along with the Army's PLA Daily, had the largest circulation. Local papers focused on local news are popular. In 1981, the English-language China Daily began publication. It printed international news and sports from the major foreign wire services as well as interesting domestic news and feature articles.

=== India ===
Robert Knight (1825–1890), founded two English language daily papers, The Statesman in Calcutta, and The Times of India in Bombay. In 1860, he bought out the Indian shareholders, merged with rival Bombay Standard, and started India's first news agency. It wired news dispatches to papers across India and became the Indian agent for Reuters news service. In 1861, he changed the name from the Bombay Times and Standard to The Times of India. Knight fought for a press free of prior restraint or intimidation, frequently resisting the attempts by governments, business interests, and cultural spokesmen and led the paper to national prominence. Knight's papers promoted Indian self-rule and often criticized the policies of the British Raj. By 1890, the company employed more than 800 people and had a sizeable circulation in India and the British Empire.

=== Iran ===
The history of newspaper publishing in Iran goes back to the 19th century, under the Qajar dynasty. The first newspaper was created by Mirza Saleh Shirazi in 1837.

=== Japan ===
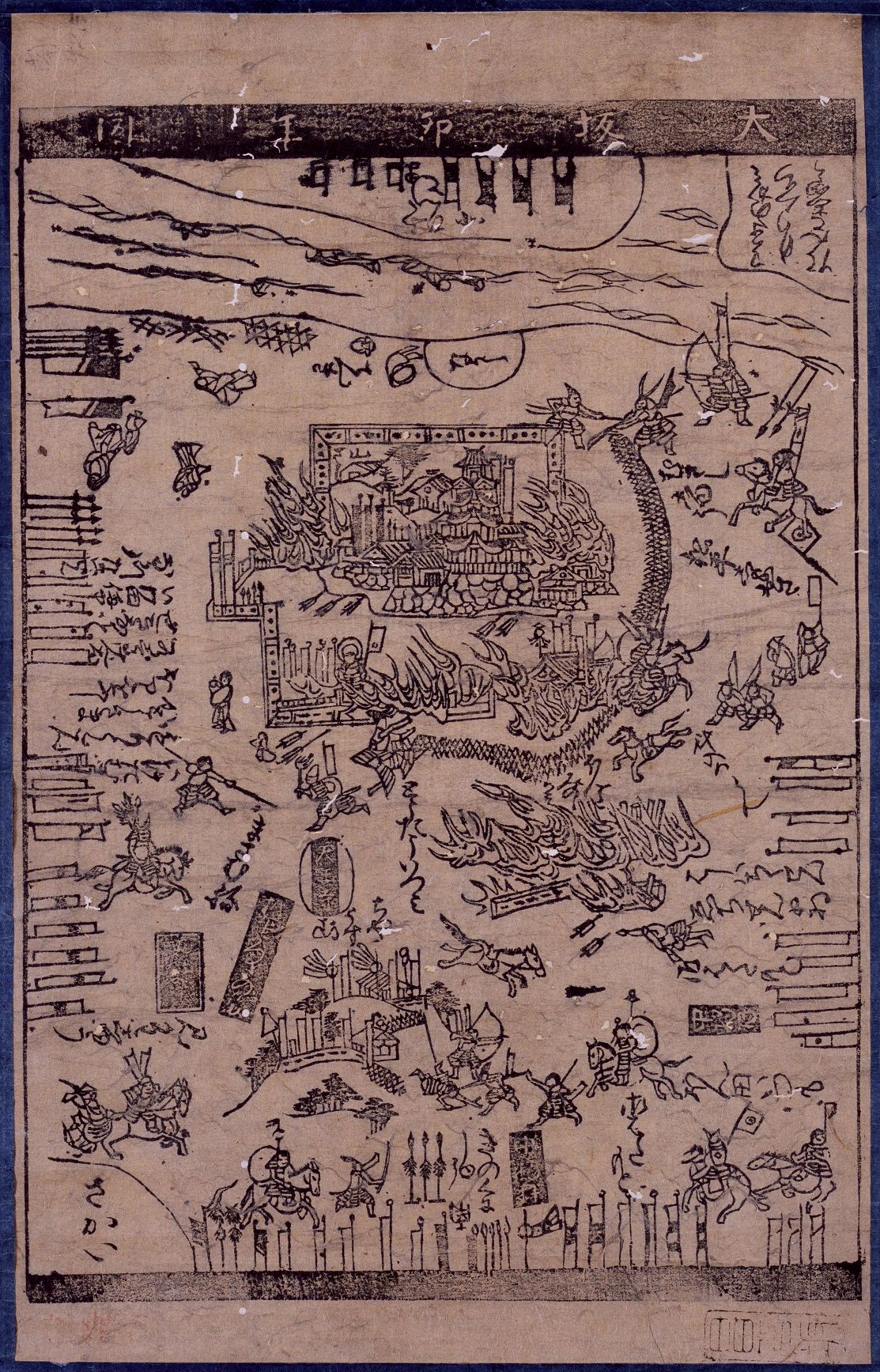
One of the first kawaraban printed, depicting the fall of Osaka Castle, 17th century

Japanese newspapers began in the 17th century as yomiuri (読売、literally "to read and sell") or kawaraban (瓦版, literally "tile-block printing" referring to the use of clay printing blocks), which were printed handbills sold in major cities to commemorate major social gatherings or events.

The first modern newspaper was the Japan Herald published bi-weekly in Yokohama by the Englishman A. W. Hansard from 1861. In 1862, the Tokugawa shogunate began publishing the Kampan batabiya shinbun, a translated edition of a widely distributed Dutch newspaper. These two papers were published for foreigners, and contained only foreign news.

The first Japanese daily newspaper that covered foreign and domestic news was the Yokohama Mainichi Shinbun (横浜市毎日新聞), first published in 1871. The papers became organs of the political parties. The early readers of these newspapers mostly came from the ranks of the samurai class.

Koshinbun were more plebeian, popular newspapers that contained local news, human interest stories, and light fiction. Examples of koshinbun were the Tokyo nichinichi shinbun, the predecessor of the present day Mainichi shinbun, which began in 1872; the Yomiuri shinbun, which began in 1874; and the Asahi shinbun, which began in 1879. They soon became the dominant form.

In the democratic era of the 1910s to the 1920s, the government tried to suppress newspapers such as the Asahi shinbun for their critical stance against government bureaucracy that favored protecting citizens' rights and constitutional democracy. In the period of growing militarism in the 1930s to 1945, newspapers faced intense government censorship and control. After Japan's defeat, strict censorship of the press continued as the American occupiers used government control in order to inculcate democratic and anti-communist values. In 1951, the American occupiers finally returned freedom of the press to Japan, which is the situation today.

== See also ==
- Decline of newspapers
- Newspaper hawker and newsboys who sold or delivered papers
- Publishing
- History of books
- History of journalism
  - History of American journalism
  - History of British newspapers
  - History of French journalism
  - History of German journalism
- History of magazine publishing
- History of mass media
- History of government gazettes
