= History of journalism =

The history of journalism spans the growth of technology and trade, marked by the advent of specialized techniques for gathering and disseminating information on a regular basis that has caused, as one history of journalism surmises, the steady increase of "the scope of news available to us and the speed with which it is transmitted". Before the printing press was invented, word of mouth was the primary source of news. Returning merchants, sailors, and travelers brought news back to the mainland, and this was then picked up by pedlars and traveling players and spread from town to town. Ancient scribes often wrote this information down. This transmission of news was highly unreliable and died out with the invention of the printing press. Newspapers (and to a lesser extent, magazines) have always been the primary medium of journalists since the 18th century, radio and television in the 20th century, and the Internet in the 21st century.

== Early and basic journalism ==
In 1556, the government of Venice first published the monthly Notizie scritte ("Written notices") which cost one gazzetta, a Venetian coin of the time, the name of which eventually came to mean "newspaper". These avvisi were handwritten newsletters and used to convey political, military, and economic news quickly and efficiently throughout Europe, more specifically Italy, during the early modern era (1500–1800)—sharing some characteristics of newspapers, though usually not considered true newspapers.

However, none of these publications fully met the modern criteria for proper newspapers, as they were typically not intended for the general public and restricted to a certain range of topics. Early publications played into the development of what would today be recognized as the newspaper, which came about around 1601. Around the 15th and 16th centuries, in England and France, long news accounts called "relations" were published; in Spain, they were called "Relaciones". Single-event news publications were printed in the broadsheet format, which was often posted. These publications also appeared as pamphlets and small booklets (for longer narratives, often written in a letter format), often containing woodcut illustrations. Literacy rates were low in comparison to today, and these news publications were often read aloud (literacy and oral culture were, in a sense, existing side by side in this scenario).

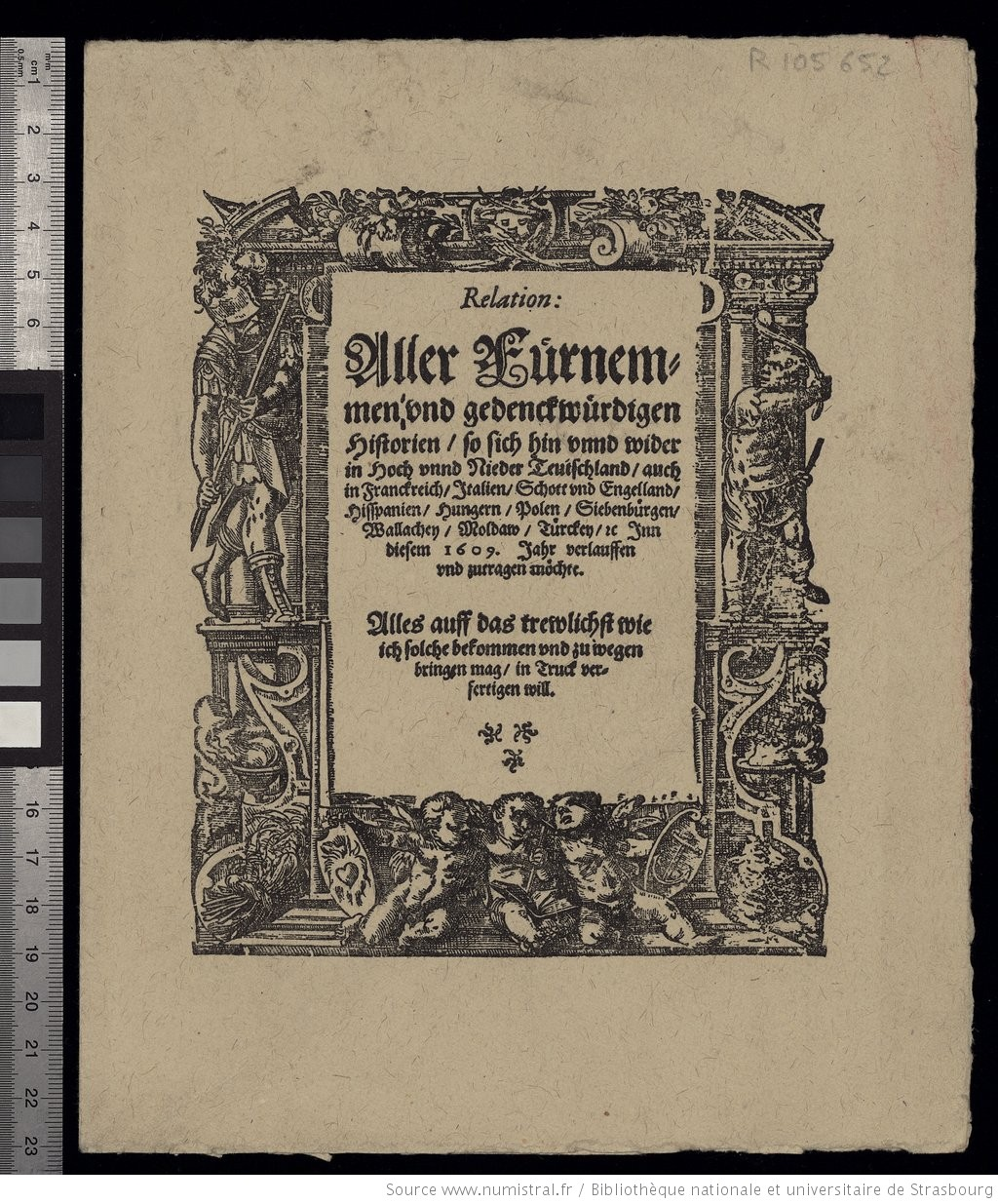
Title page of Carolus' Relation from 1609, the earliest newspaper

By 1400, businessmen in Italian and German cities were compiling handwritten chronicles of important news events, and circulating them to their business connections. The idea of using a printing press for this material first appeared in Germany around 1600. Early precursors were the so-called Messrelationen ("trade fair reports") which were semi-annual news compilations for the large book fairs at Frankfurt and Leipzig, starting in the 1580s. The first true newspaper was the weekly Relation aller Fuernemmen und gedenckwürdigen Historien ("Collection of all distinguished and memorable news"), started in Strasbourg in 1605. The Avisa Relation oder Zeitung was published in Wolfenbüttel from 1609, and gazettes soon were established in Frankfurt (1615), Berlin (1617) and Hamburg (1618). By 1650, 30 German cities had active gazettes. A semi-yearly news chronicle, in Latin, the Mercurius Gallobelgicus, was published at Cologne between 1594 and 1635, but it was not the model for other publications.

The news circulated between newsletters through well-established channels in 17th-century Europe. Antwerp was the hub of two networks, one linking France, Britain, Germany, and the Netherlands; the other linking Italy, Spain and Portugal. Favorite topics included wars, military affairs, diplomacy, and court business and gossip.

After 1600 the national governments in France and England began printing official newsletters. In 1622 the first English-language weekly magazine, "A current of General News", was published and distributed in England in an 8- to 24-page quarto format.

== Revolutionary changes in the 19th century ==
Newspapers in all major countries became much more important in the 19th century because of a series of technical, business, political, and cultural changes. High-speed presses and cheap wood-based newsprint made large circulations possible. The rapid expansion of elementary education meant a vast increase in the number of potential readers. Political parties sponsored newspapers at the local and national levels. Toward the end of the century, advertising became well-established and became the main source of revenue for newspaper owners. This led to a race to obtain the largest possible circulation, often followed by downplaying partisanship so that members of all parties would buy a paper. The number of newspapers in Europe in the 1860s and 1870s was steady at about 6,000; then it doubled to 12,000 in 1900. In the 1860s and 1870s, most newspapers were four pages of editorials, reprinted speeches, excerpts from novels and poetry and a few small local ads. They were expensive, and most readers went to a café to look over the latest issue. There were major national papers in each capital city, such as the London Times, the London Post, the Paris Temps and so on. They were expensive and directed to the National political elite. Every decade the presses became faster, and the invention of automatic typesetting in the 1880s made feasible the overnight printing of a large morning newspaper. Cheap wood pulp replaced the much more expensive rag paper. A major cultural innovation was the professionalization of news gathering, handled by specialist reporters. Liberalism led to freedom of the press, and ended newspaper taxes, along with a sharp reduction to government censorship. Entrepreneurs interested in profit increasingly replaced politicians interested in shaping party positions, so there was dramatic outreach to a larger subscription base. The price fell to a penny. In New York, "Yellow Journalism" used sensationalism, comics (they were colored yellow), a strong emphasis on team sports, reduced coverage of political details and speeches, a new emphasis on crime, and a vastly expanded advertising section featuring especially major department stores. Women had previously been ignored, but now they were given multiple advice columns on family, household, and fashion issues, and the advertising was increasingly pitched to them.

== Radio and television ==
Radio broadcasting began in the 1920s and reached its height in the 1930s and 1940s. Experimental television was being studied before the 2nd world war, became operational in the late 1940s, and became widespread in the 1950s and 1960s, largely but not entirely displacing radio.

== Internet journalism ==
The rapidly growing impact of the Internet, especially after 2000, brought "free" news and classified advertising to audiences, undermining the paid subscription and local advertising model of many newspapers. Bankruptcy loomed across the U.S. and did hit such major papers as the Rocky Mountain News (Denver), the Chicago Tribune and the Los Angeles Times, among many others. Chapman and Nuttall find that proposed solutions, such as multi-platforms, paywalls, PR-dominated news gathering, and shrinking staffs have not resolved the challenge. The result, they argue, is that journalism today is characterized by four themes: personalization, globalization, localization, and pauperization. Others point to the growth of nonprofit journalism as an additional result of the internet, whereby some struggling for-profit outlets convert to nonprofit status to survive and other nonprofit startups like ProPublica grow to fill some of the void.

== By country or region ==
=== Canada ===
There were five important periods in the history of Canadian newspapers' responsible for the eventual development of the modern newspaper. These are the "Transplant Period" from 1750 to 1800, when printing and newspapers initially came to Canada as publications of government news and proclamations; followed by the "Partisan Period from 1800–1850," when individual printers and editors played a growing role in politics. The "Nation Building Period from 1850–1900," when Canadian editors began the work of establishing a common nationalistic view of Canadian society. The "Modern period" from 1900 to 1980s saw the professionalization of the industry and the growth of chains. "Current history" since the 1990s saw outside interests take over the chains, as they faced new competition from the Internet.

=== China ===
Journalism in China before 1910 primarily served the international community. The main national newspapers in Chinese were published by Protestant missionary societies in order to reach the literate. Hard news was not their specialty, but they did train the first generation of Chinese journalists in Western standards of newsgathering, editorials, and advertising. Demands for reform and revolution were impossible for papers based inside China. Instead, such demands appeared in polemical papers based in Japan, for example, those edited by Liang Qichao (1873–1929).

The overthrow of the old imperial regime in 1911 produced a surge in Chinese nationalism, an end to censorship, and a demand for professional, nationwide journalism. All the major cities launched such efforts. Special attention was paid to China's role in World War I, to the disappointing Paris Peace Conference of 1919, and to the aggressive demands and actions of Japan against Chinese interests. Journalists created professional organizations and aspired to separate news from commentary. At the Press Congress of the World conference in Honolulu in 1921, the Chinese delegates were among the most Westernized and self-consciously professional journalists from the developing world. By the late 1920s, however, there was a much greater emphasis on advertising and expanding circulation, and much less interest in the sort of advocacy journalism that had inspired the revolutionaries.

=== Denmark ===
Danish news media first appeared in the 1540s, when handwritten fly sheets reported on the news. In 1666, Anders Bording, the father of Danish journalism, began a state paper. The royal privilege to bring out a newspaper was issued to Joachim Wielandt in 1720. University officials handled the censorship, but in 1770 Denmark became one of the first nations of the world to provide for press freedom; it ended in 1799. The press in 1795–1814, led by intellectuals and civil servants, called out for a more just and modern society, and spoke out for the oppressed tenant farmers against the power of the old aristocracy.

In 1834, the first liberal newspaper appeared one that gave much more emphasis to actual news content rather than opinions. The newspapers championed the Revolution of 1848 in Denmark. The new constitution of 1849 liberated the Danish press. Newspapers flourished in the second half of the 19th century, usually tied to one or another political party or labor union. Modernization, bringing in new features and mechanical techniques, appeared after 1900. The total circulation was 500,000 daily in 1901, more than doubling to 1.2 million in 1925. The German occupation brought informal censorship; some offending newspaper buildings were simply blown up by the Nazis. During the war, the underground produced 550 newspapers—small, surreptitiously printed sheets that encouraged sabotage and resistance.

The appearance of a dozen editorial cartoons ridiculing Mohammed set off Muslim outrage and violent threats around the world. (see: Jyllands-Posten Muhammad cartoons controversy) Some members of the Muslim community decided the caricatures in the Copenhagen newspaper Jyllands-Posten in September 2005 represented another instance of Western animosity toward Islam and were so sacrilegious that the perpetrators deserved severe punishment.

The historiography of the Danish press is rich with scholarly studies. Historians have made insights into Danish political, social and cultural history, finding that individual newspapers are valid analytical entities, which can be studied in terms of source, content, audience, media, and effect.

=== France ===
==== 1632 to 1815 ====
The first newspaper in France, the Gazette de France, was established in 1632 by the king's physician Theophrastus Renaudot (1586–1653), with the patronage of Louis XIII. All newspapers were subject to prepublication censorship, and served as instruments of propaganda for the monarchy.

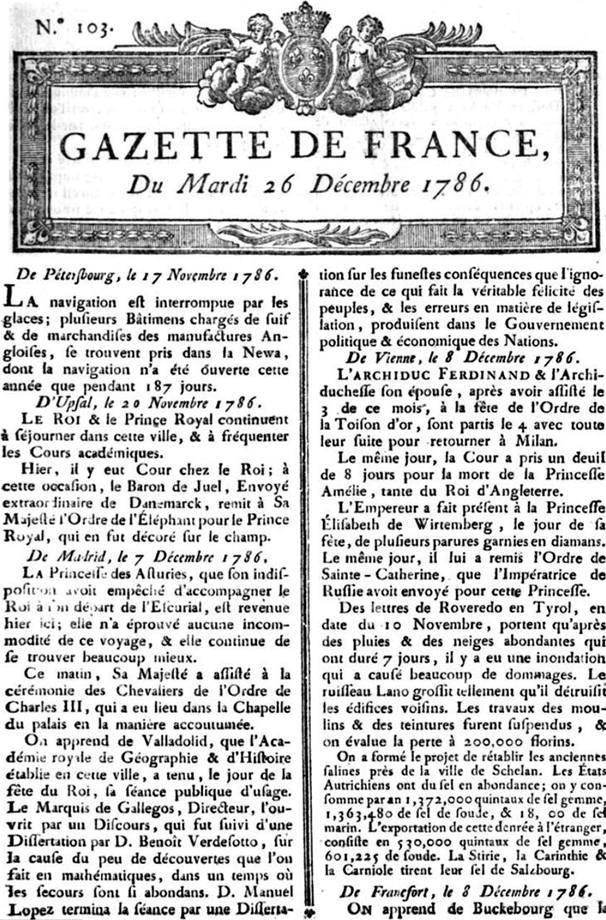
La Gazette, 26 December 1786

Under the ancien regime, the most prominent magazines were Mercure de France, Journal des sçavans, founded in 1665 for scientists, and Gazette de France, founded in 1631. Jean Loret was one of France's first journalists. He disseminated the weekly news of music, dance and Parisian society from 1650 until 1665 in verse, in what he called a gazette burlesque, assembled in three volumes of La Muse Historique (1650, 1660, 1665). The French press lagged a generation behind the British, for they catered to the needs of the aristocracy, while the newer British counterparts were oriented toward the middle and working classes.

Periodicals were censored by the central government in Paris. They were not totally quiescent politically—often they criticized Church abuses and bureaucratic ineptitude. They supported the monarchy and they played at most a small role in stimulating the revolution. During the Revolution new periodicals played central roles as propaganda organs for various factions. Jean-Paul Marat (1743–1793) was the most prominent editor. His L'Ami du peuple advocated vigorously for the rights of the lower classes against the enemies of the people Marat hated; it closed when he was assassinated. After 1800 Napoleon reimposed strict censorship.

==== 1815 to 1914 ====
Magazines flourished after Napoleon left in 1815. Most were based in Paris and most emphasized literature, poetry and stories. They served religious, cultural and political communities. In times of political crisis they expressed and helped shape the views of their readership and thereby were major elements in the changing political culture. For example, there were eight Catholic periodicals in 1830 in Paris. None were officially owned or sponsored by the Church and they reflected a range of opinions among educated Catholics about current issues, such as the 1830 July Revolution that overthrew the Bourbon monarchy. Several were strong supporters of the Bourbon kings, but all eight ultimately urged support for the new government, putting their appeals in terms of preserving civil order. They often discussed the relationship between church and state. Generally, they urged priests to focus on spiritual matters and not engage in politics. Historian M. Patricia Dougherty says this process created a distance between the Church and the new monarch and enabled Catholics to develop a new understanding of church-state relationships and the source of political authority.

==== 20th century ====
The press was handicapped during the war by shortages of newsprint and young journalists, and by an abundance of censorship designed to maintain home front morale by minimizing bad war news. The Parisian newspapers were largely stagnant after the war; circulation inched up to 6 million a day from 5 million in 1910. The major postwar success story was Paris Soir; which lacked any political agenda and was dedicated to providing a mix of sensational reporting to aid circulation, and serious articles to build prestige. By 1939, its circulation was over 1.7 million, double that of its nearest rival the tabloid Le Petit Parisien. In addition to its daily paper Paris Soir sponsored a highly successful women's magazine Marie-Claire. Another magazine Match was modelled after the photojournalism of the American magazine Life.

John Gunther wrote in 1940 that of the more than 100 daily newspapers in Paris, two (L'Humanité and Action Française's publication) were honest; "Most of the others, from top to bottom, have news columns for sale". He reported that Bec et Ongles was simultaneously subsidized by the French government, German government, and Alexandre Stavisky, and that Italy allegedly paid 65 million francs to French newspapers in 1935. France was a democratic society in the 1930s, but the people were kept in the dark about critical issues of foreign policy. The government tightly controlled all of the media to promulgate propaganda to support the government's foreign policy of appeasement to the aggressions of Italy and especially Nazi Germany. There were 253 daily newspapers, all owned separately. The five major national papers based in Paris were all under the control of special interests, especially right-wing political and business interests that supported appeasement. They were all venal, taking large secret subsidies to promote the policies of various special interests. Many leading journalists were secretly on the government payroll. The regional and local newspapers were heavily dependent on government advertising and published news and editorials to suit Paris. Most of the international news was distributed through the Havas agency, which was largely controlled by the government.

=== Germany ===
The history of German journalism dates to the 16th century. Germany invented printing and produced its first newspapers in the 16th century. However, Germany was divided into so many competing states that before unification in 1871, no newspaper played a dominant role.

=== India ===
The first newspaper in India was circulated in 1780 under the editorship of James Augustus Hicky, named Bengal Gazette. On May 30, 1826 Udant Martand (The Rising Sun), the first Hindi-language newspaper published in India, started from Calcutta (now Kolkata), published every Tuesday by Pt. Jugal Kishore Shukla. Maulawi Muhammad Baqir in 1836 founded the first Urdu-language newspaper the Delhi Urdu Akhbar. India's press in the 1840s was a motley collection of small-circulation daily or weekly sheets printed on rickety presses. Few extended beyond their small communities and seldom tried to unite the many castes, tribes, and regional subcultures of India. The Anglo-Indian papers promoted purely British interests. Englishman Robert Knight (1825–1890) founded two important English-language newspapers that reached a broad Indian audience, The Times of India and The Statesman. They promoted nationalism in India, as Knight introduced the people to the power of the press and made them familiar with political issues and the political process.

=== Italy ===
==== Early developments ====
Before the development of the first regularly issued printed newspapers in the mid-17th century, from about 1500 to 1700, hand-written newsletters, known by various names such as avvisi, reporti, gazzette, ragguagli, were the fastest and most efficient means by which military and political news could be circulated in Italy.

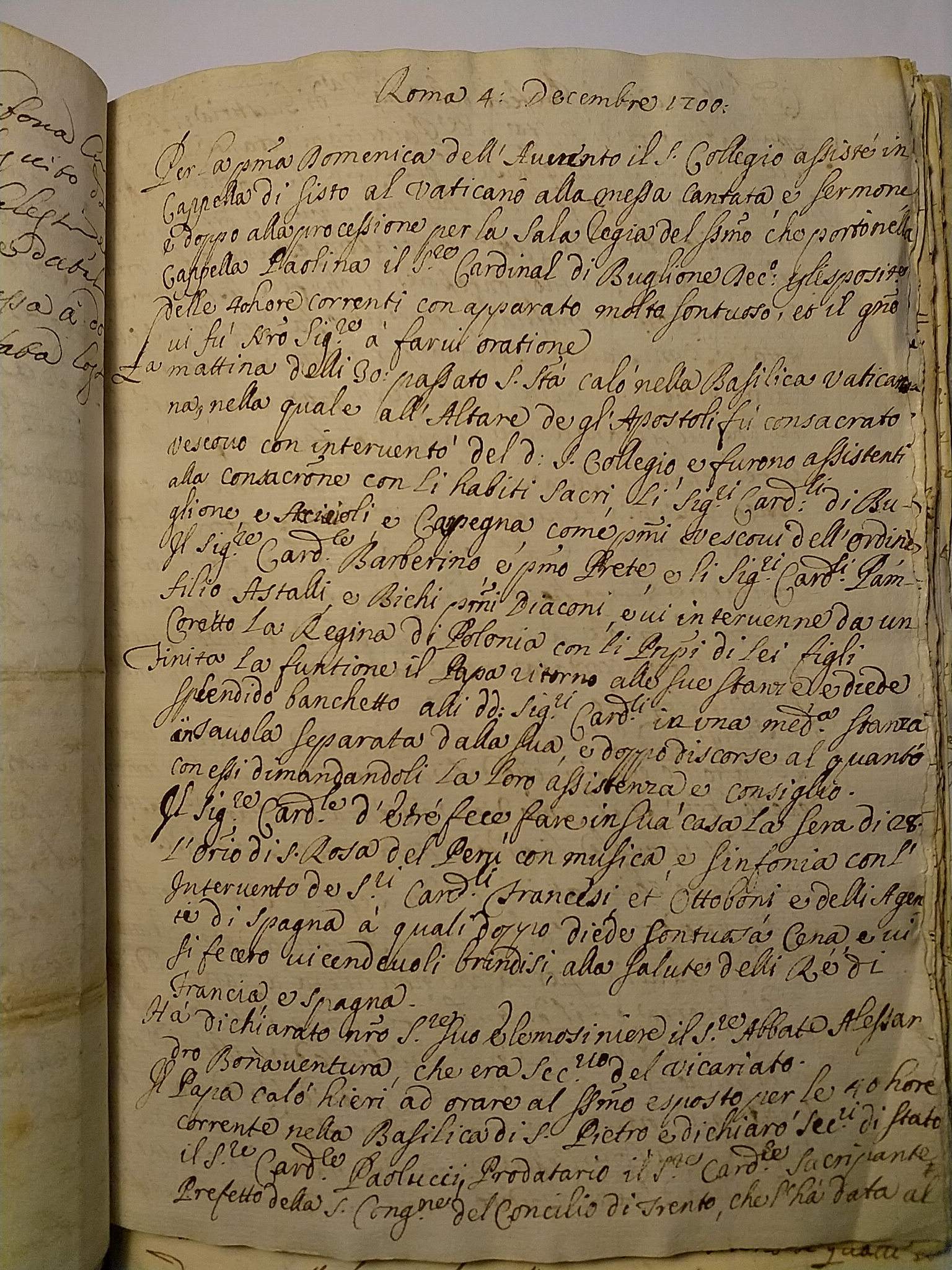
Avviso from Rome dated 4 Dec 1700

Used to convey political, military and economic news quickly, hand-written avvisi spread through Italy, generated by the desire of each court to know the activities of opposing and even allied courts. Over time, this information that had been provided for free eventually was sold by specialists and distributed by couriers in order to meet the high demand for such a product. From the middle of the 16th century Italian newsletter writers, called menanti, reportisti, or gazzettieri, set up news services, the regularity of which may have been dictated by the postal service network in their region.

The avvisi found their origins, and peaked, in early modern Rome and Venice. It is not difficult to understand why these two cities, in particular, should have played a central role in the development of a 'news service'. The words of Vittorio Siri, explaining his reasons for choosing the place where he would work as a contemporary historian, offer one explanation. He says he needed 'a city like that which Plutarch sought for a historian, that is, where there was a great and powerful court, full of ambassadors and minsters', where 'more than in any other city in the world one could see a multitude of personages and soldiers who had been ambassadors at all the courts of Europe and where civil questions were managed by nobles, where people practiced who possessed refined judicial abilities and were knowledgeable about the affairs of princes. Siri was referring to Venice, but Rome, the capital of the Catholic Church, was no different. Indeed, only a few years earlier Maiolino Bisaccioni, one of the many adventurous historian-gazetteers of the period, had declared 'Rome, as you know [is] the place where all the news in the world is found.

The content and character of the avvisi differed between the two cities. Roman avvisi contained ecclesiastical, political, and criminal intrigue, taking advantage of opposing factions willing to divulge state secrets or official gossip for their own benefit. These were then read by church and government officials as well as the nobility. Such was the partisan (and sometimes scandalous) comments on public affairs that they became censored by the Pope and several copyists were imprisoned or executed. The celebrated Roman jurist Prospero Farinacci argued that the revelation of state secrets by the writers of newsletters was a crime that had to be punished no less seriously than the crimen laesae maiestatis. Venetian avvisi were more conservative in their coverage of such events and more preoccupied with commercial matters.

==== 17th century ====
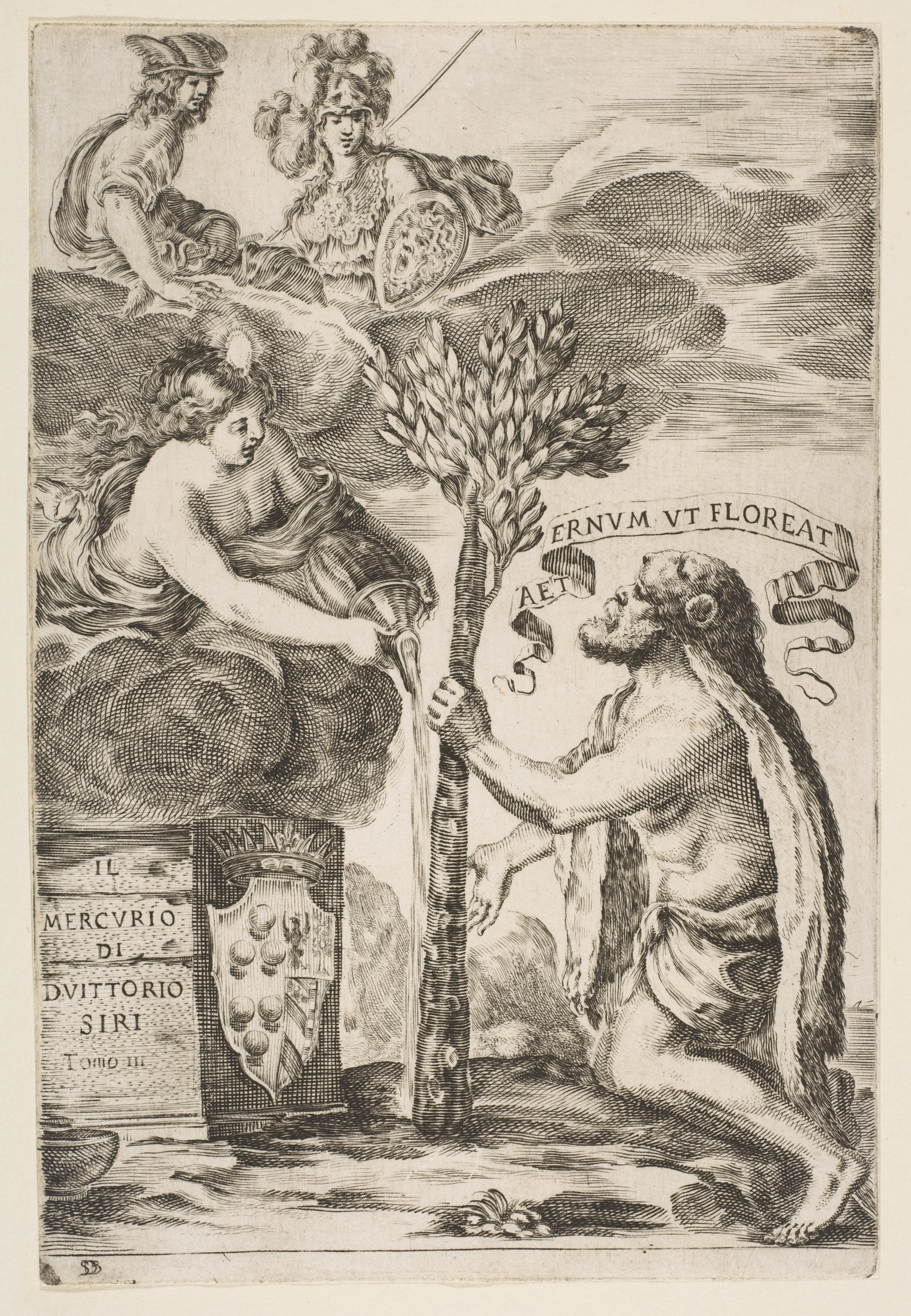
Title page of the third volume of Vittorio Siri's Il Mercurio (1652), etched by Stefano della Bella

Printed avvisi did not appear in Italy until the first half of the seventeenth century. Possible reasons for this were easier avoidance of censorship in hand-written form, reluctance of copyists to use printing technology (which they viewed as a threat to their job security), and clients desiring the status offered by hand-written information as opposed to the "vulgar" print.

By the late 1630s manuscript news-sheets diminished in importance because of their limited circulation and high costs. Scholars suppose that the first newspaper printed in Italy was edited in Florence in 1636 by Amador Massi and Lorenzo Landi, but no issue was discovered to confirm that conjecture, therefore the newspaper Genova, printed from 1639, shall be considered the oldest printed newspaper in Italy. By the mid-seventeenth century irregularly printed news-sheets had become routine in many Italian cities. The Gazzetta di Mantova, the world's oldest newspaper still existing and published with the same name, was established in June 1664. By the late 17th century, newspapers in the Papal States had become increasingly widespread, with nearly every main town establishing its own local publication.

In 1668 the first Italian scientific journal was published, the Giornale de' Letterati, following the Journal des sçavans and the Philosophical Transactions in style. The Giornale de' Letterati had little political significance, but played an important role in disseminating the results of research and cultural work done outside Italy and in spreading news on Italian culture throughout Europe. The journal was continued to 1675, and another series was carried on to 1769. Benedetto Bacchini brought out at Parma (1688–1690) and at Modena (1692–1697) a periodical with a similar title.

==== 18th century ====
Literary journals attained a larger audience in the eighteenth century. The Giornale de' letterati d'Italia, founded by Apostolo Zeno with the help of Francesco Scipione Maffei and Ludovico Antonio Muratori (1710), was continued after 1718 by Pietro Zeno, and after 1728 by Mastraca and Paitoni. Another Giornale, to which Fabroni contributed, was published at Pisa from 1771 onwards. The Galleria di Minerva, first published at Venice in 1696, covered current events, arts and culture. One of the many merits of the antiquary Giovanni Lami was his connexion with the Novelle letterarie (1740–1770), founded by him, and after the first two years almost entirely written by him. Its learning and impartiality gave it much authority. The Frusta letteraria (1763–1765), influenced by the English Spectator, was brought out at Venice by Giuseppe Baretti under the pseudonym of Aristarco Scannabue.

==== 19th century ====
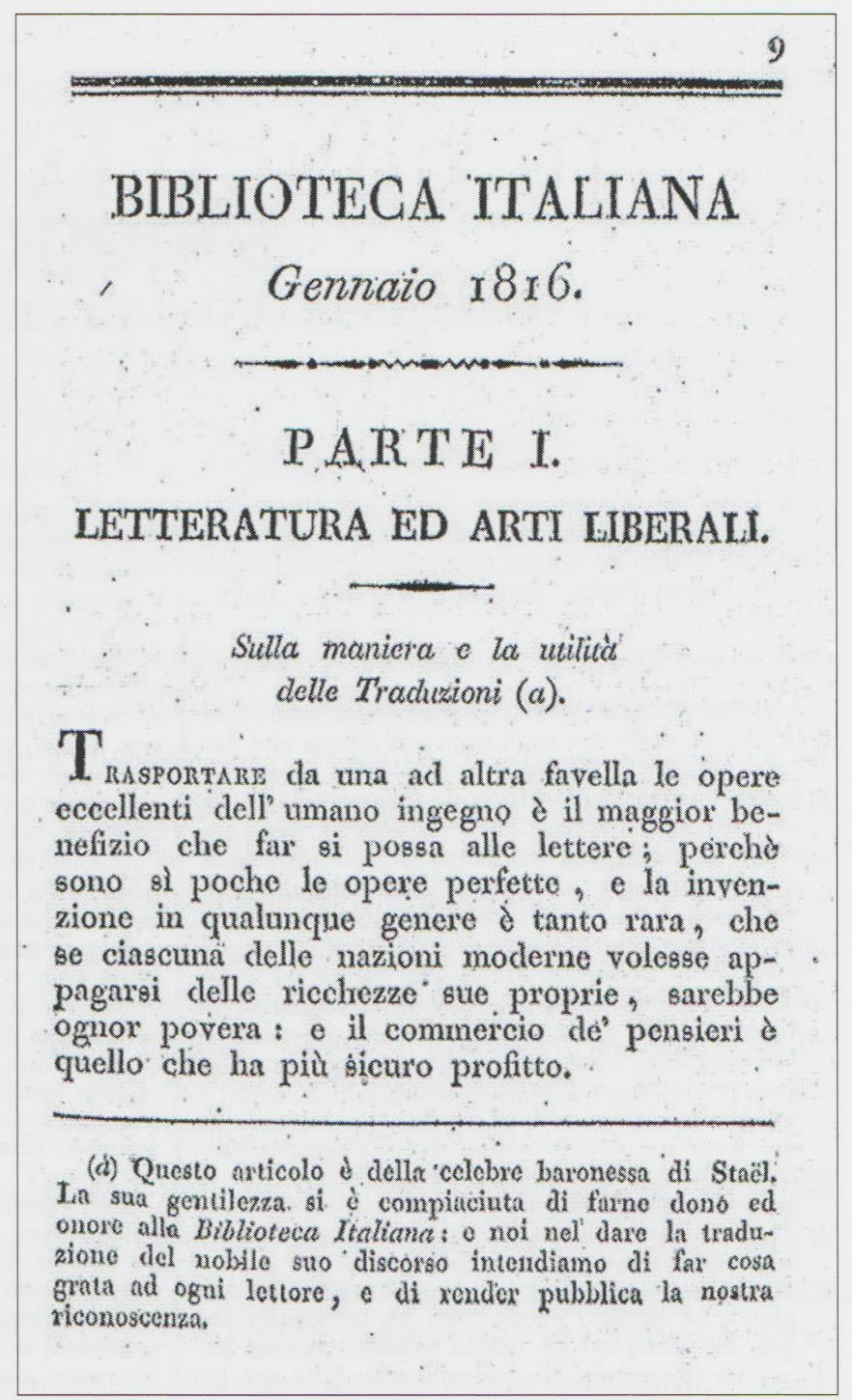
Mme de Staël influential article “Sulla maniera e l'utilità delle traduzioni”, published on the first issue of the Italian journal Biblioteca Italiana, January 1816

The next that deserve mention are the Giornale enciclopedico (1806) of Naples, followed by the Progresso delle scienze (1833–1848) and the Museo di scienze e letteratura of the same city, and the Giornale arcadico (1819) of Rome. Among the contributors to the Poligrafo (1811) of Milan were Monti, Perticari, and some of the first names in Italian literature. The Biblioteca italiana (1816–1840) was founded at Milan by the favour of the Austrian government, and the editorship was offered to and declined by Ugo Foscolo. Originally directed by Giuseppe Acerbi, Pietro Giordani, and Vincenzo Monti, it became the symbol of conservative, neoclassical culture. Another Milanese serial was the Conciliatore (1818–1820), which although it only lived two years, will be remembered for the endeavours made by Silvio Pellico, Camillo Ugoni and its other contributors to introduce a more dignified and courageous method of criticism. After its suppression and the falling off in interest of the Biblioteca italiana the next of any merit to appear was the Antologia, a monthly periodical brought out at Florence in 1820 by Gino Capponi and Giovan Pietro Vieusseux, but suppressed in 1833 on account of an epigram of Tommaseo, a principal writer. Some striking papers were contributed by Giuseppe Mazzini. Naples had in 1832 Il Progresso of Carlo Troya, helped by Tommaseo and Centofanti, and Palermo owned the Giornale di statistica (1834), suppressed eight years later. The Archivio storico, consisting of reprints of documents with historical dissertations, dates from 1842, and was founded by Vieusseux and Gino Capponi. La Civiltà Cattolica (1850), founded in Naples by Father Carlo Maria Curci, and his three fellow Jesuits, Taparelli, Bresciani and Liberatore, is still the organ of the Jesuit Order. The Rivista contemporanea (1852) was founded at Turin in emulation of the French Revue des deux Mondes, which has been the type followed by so many continental periodicals. The Politecnico (1839) of Milan was suppressed in 1844 and revived in 1859. The Nuova Antologia (1866) soon acquired a well-deserved reputation as a high-class review and magazine; its rival, the Rivista europea, being the special organ of the Florentine men of letters. The Rassegna settimanale was a weekly political and literary review, which after eight years of existence gave place to a daily newspaper, the Rassegna. The Archivio trentino (1882) was the organ of “Italia Irredenta.” The Rassegna nazionale, conducted by the marchese Manfredo di Passano, a chief of the moderate clerical party, the Nuova rivista of Turin, the Fanfulla della Domenica, and the Gazzetta letteraria may also be mentioned.

=== Latin America and the Caribbean ===
British influence extended globally through its colonies and its informal business relationships with merchants in major cities. They needed up-to-date market and political information. The Diário de Pernambuco was founded in Recife, Brazil, in 1825. El Mercurio was founded in Valparaiso, Chile, in 1827. The most influential newspaper in Peru, El Comercio, first appeared in 1839. The Jornal do Commercio was established in Rio de Janeiro, Brazil, in 1827. Much later Argentina founded its newspapers in Buenos Aires: La Prensa in 1869 and La Nacion in 1870.

In Jamaica, there were a number of newspapers that represented the views of the white planters who owned slaves. These newspapers included titles such as the Royal Gazette, The Diary and Kingston Daily Advertiser, Cornwall Chronicle, Cornwall Gazette, and Jamaica Courant. In 1826, two free coloureds, Edward Jordan and Robert Osborn founded The Watchman, which openly campaigned for the rights of free coloureds, and became Jamaica's first anti-slavery newspaper. In 1830, the criticism of the slave-owning hierarchy was too much, and the Jamaican colonial authorities arrested Jordan, the editor, and charged him with constructive treason. However, Jordan was eventually acquitted, and he eventually became Mayor of Kingston in post-Emancipation Jamaica.

On the abolition of slavery in the 1830s, Gleaner Company was founded by two Jamaican Jewish brothers, Joshua and Jacob De Cordova, budding businessmen who represented the new class of light-skinned Jamaicans taking over post-Emancipation Jamaica. While the Gleaner represented the new establishment for the next century, there was a growing black, nationalist movement that campaigned for increased political representation and rights in the early twentieth century. To this end, Osmond Theodore Fairclough founded Public Opinion in 1937. O.T. Fairclough was supported by radical journalists Frank Hill and H.P. Jacobs, and the first edition of this new newspaper tried to galvanize public opinion around a new nationalism. Strongly aligned to the People's National Party (PNP), Public Opinion counted among its journalists progressive figures such as Roger Mais, Una Marson, Amy Bailey, Louis Marriott, Peter Abrahams, and future prime minister Michael Manley, among others.

While Public Opinion campaigned for self-government, British prime minister Winston Churchill made it known he had no intention of presiding "over the liquidation of the British Empire", and consequently the Jamaican nationalists in the PNP were disappointed with the watered-down constitution that was handed down to Jamaica in 1944. Mais wrote an article saying "Now we know why the draft of the new constitution has not been published before," because the underlings of Churchill were "all over the British Empire implementing the real imperial policy implicit in the statement by the Prime Minister". The British colonial police raided the offices of Public Opinion, seized Mais's manuscript, arrested Mais himself, and convicted him of seditious libel, jailing him for six months.

=== Poland ===
History of Polish journalism dates to the 15th century. The first Polish newspaper was Merkuriusz Polski Ordynaryjny, published in 1661.

=== Russia ===
The history of Russian journalism covers writing for newspapers, magazines, and electronic media since the 18th century. The main themes are low levels of literacy, censorship and government control, and the emphasis on politics and political propaganda in the media.

=== United Kingdom ===
==== 16th century ====
By the end of the sixteenth century the word gazzetta began to spread from Italy to England. The definition given to the term by John Florio in his Italian-English dictionary A Worlde of Wordes of 1598 is significant; under the Italian entry for the plural form gazzette there is a precise definition: “the daily newse or intelligence written from Italie, namely from Rome and Venice, tales running newes.” Florio records another two connected terms: the verb gazzettare meaning “to write or report daily occurrences one to another, to tell flying tales” and the profession of gazzettiere defined as “an intelligencer or such as have daily occurrences.” Towards the end of the sixteenth century the Italian term gazzetta became popular. Francis Bacon in his own correspondence uses the Italian term gazzetta rather than a matching English term or the anglicised word “gazette.” In the same time the term reporto, widely used in Venice with the same meaning, was carried to England as the word report. Consequently reportista (reporter) became synonymous with a compiler of newsletters or gazettes.

==== 17th century ====
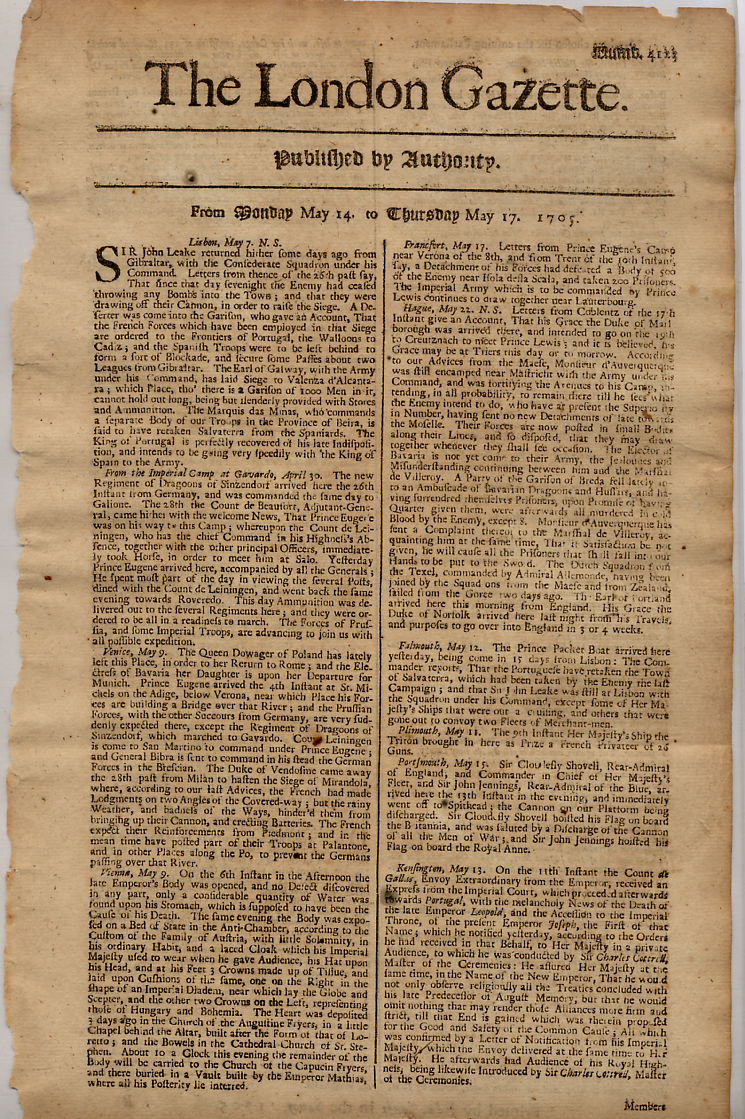
The London Gazette, dated 14–17 May 1705 detailing the return of John Leake from Gibraltar after the Battle of Cabrita Point

On 7 November 1665, The London Gazette (at first called The Oxford Gazette) began publication. It was published twice a week. Other English papers started to publish three times a week, and later the first daily papers emerged. Publication was controlled under the Licensing Act 1662, but the act's lapses from 1679 to 1685 and from 1695 onwards encouraged a number of new titles.

Mercurius Caledonius founded in Edinburgh in 1660, was Scotland's first but short-lived newspaper. Only 12 editions were published during 1660 and 1661.

Early British newspapers typically included short articles, ephemeral topics, some illustrations and service articles (classifieds). They were often written by multiple authors, although the authors' identities were often obscured. They began to contain some advertisements, and they did not yet include sections.

==== 20th century ====
By 1900 popular journalism in Britain aimed at the largest possible audience, including the working class, had proven a success and made its profits through advertising. Alfred Harmsworth, 1st Viscount Northcliffe (1865–1922), "More than anyone... shaped the modern press. Developments he introduced or harnessed remain central: broad contents, exploitation of advertising revenue to subsidize prices, aggressive marketing, subordinate regional markets, independence from party control. His Daily Mail held the world record for daily circulation until his death. Prime Minister Lord Salisbury quipped it was "written by office boys for office boys".

Socialist and labour newspapers also proliferated and in 1912 the Daily Herald was launched as the first daily newspaper of the trade union and labour movement.

Newspapers reached their peak of importance during the First World War, in part because wartime issues were so urgent and newsworthy, while members of Parliament were constrained by the all-party coalition government from attacking the government. By 1914 Northcliffe controlled 40 percent of the morning newspaper circulation in Britain, 45 percent of the evening and 15 percent of the Sunday circulation. He eagerly tried to turn it into political power, especially in attacking the government in the Shell Crisis of 1915. Lord Beaverbrook said he was, "the greatest figure who ever strode down Fleet Street." A.J.P. Taylor, however, says, "Northcliffe could destroy when he used the news properly. He could not step into the vacant place. He aspired to power instead of influence, and as a result, forfeited both."

Other powerful editors included C. P. Scott of the Manchester Guardian, James Louis Garvin of The Observer and Henry William Massingham of the highly influential weekly magazine of opinion, The Nation.

=== United States ===
Journalism in the United States began as a "humble" affair and became a political force in the campaign for American independence. Following independence, the first amendment to the U.S. Constitution guaranteed freedom of the press and freedom of speech. The American press grew rapidly following the American Revolution. The press became a key support element to the country's political parties, but also for organized religious institutions.

During the 19th century, newspapers began to expand and appear outside the cities of the Eastern United States. From the 1830s onward the penny press began to play a major role in American journalism. Technological advancements such as the telegraph and faster printing presses in the 1840s helped expand the press of the nation, as it experienced rapid economic and demographic growth.

By 1900, major newspapers had become profitable powerhouses of advocacy, muckraking and sensationalism, along with serious, and objective news-gathering. In the early 20th century, before television, the average American read several newspapers per day. Starting in the 1920s, changes in technology again morphed the nature of American journalism as radio and later, television, began to play increasingly important roles.

In the late 20th century, much of American journalism merged into big media conglomerates (principally owned by media moguls like Ted Turner and Rupert Murdoch). With the coming of digital journalism in the 21st Century, newspapers faced a business crisis as readers turned to the internet for news and advertisers followed them.

== Historiography ==
Journalism historian David Nord has argued that in the 1960s and 1970s:

"In journalism history and media history, a new generation of scholars . . . criticized traditional histories of the media for being too insular, too decontextualized, too uncritical, too captive to the needs of professional training, and too enamored of the biographies of men and media organizations."

In 1974, James W. Carey identified the 'Problem of Journalism History'. The field was dominated by a Whig interpretation of journalism history.

"This views journalism history as the slow, steady expansion of freedom and knowledge from the political press to the commercial press, the setbacks into sensationalism and yellow journalism, the forward thrust into muck raking and social responsibility....the entire story is framed by those large impersonal forces buffeting the press: industrialization, urbanization and mass democracy.

O'Malley says the criticism went too far because there was much of value in the deep scholarship of the earlier period.

== See also ==
- History of books
- History of broadcasting
- History of newspaper publishing
- History of radio
- History of television
- History of journalism in the United Kingdom
- History of journalism in Colombia
- News broadcasting
- History of magazines
- History of mass media
- History of newspapers
- Online magazine
- Online newspaper
