= Luca Assarino =

Italian writer, journalist and informer (1602–1672)

- Born: October 18, 1602; Potosí, Viceroyalty of Peru
- Died: October 18, 1672 (aged 70); Turin, Duchy of Savoy
- Spouse(s): Geronima Pino, Ottavia Battezzati
- Writing career
- Language: Italian
- Genres: novel, historical, journalism
- Notable works: La Stratonica; Delle guerre e successi d'Italia
- Literary movement: Baroque

Luca Assarino (18 October 1602 – 18 October 1672) was an Italian writer, journalist and informer. His novel La Stratonica was among the most read novels in the 17th-century Italy.

== Life ==
Luca Assarino was born on 18 October 1602 in Potosí, his father was from Liguria and his mother a Portuguese. In 1612 he followed his father who returned to his homeland, and set up home in Santa Margherita Ligure. In 1618, Luca married Geronima Pino, the daughter of a notary.

In 1619 Assarino was sentenced to 10 years of confinement in Corsica for having killed a young man. He got parole in 1625 subject to the obligation to join the army, where he served until 1627. After another charge of murder, of his father-in-law, he was sentenced to three years of imprisonment in Savona, he escaped and his wife bailed him.

In 1635 he published his first novel, La Stratonica, promptly translated into English, French and German, which became among the most read novels in 17th-Century Italy, having reached thirty editions between 1635 and 1697. Other writings followed: the novel L'Armelinda in 1640, Zampilli d'Ippocrene and Ragguagli d'Amore del Regno di Cipro two poems dated 1642, the historical book Delle rivoluzioni di Catalogna in 1644 and a religious book Vita e miracoli di S. Antonio da Padova in 1646.

In 1646 he became editor of the newspaper Genova (known as Il Sincero for the additional title that sometimes appeared under his management), a job he carried out until 1660 along with the writing of hand-writing newssheets, which he used to sell at high prices. In 1649, due to his pro-French leanings, he was appointed official historiographer of the Duchy of Savoy thanks to Christine of France.

In 1660, he moved to Milan and then to Mantua in the following years, and also lived in Casale. After going back to Milan he published his most important historical work Delle guerre e successi d'Italia (in English: Of the wars and events of Italy), which had a reasonable success, even if nowadays it is considered partisan and not accurate. In the meantime he worked as informer for the Savoy, Spain and Genoa. He died in Turin on 18 October 1672.
