= Genova (newspaper 1642–1684) =

Newspaper 1642–1684

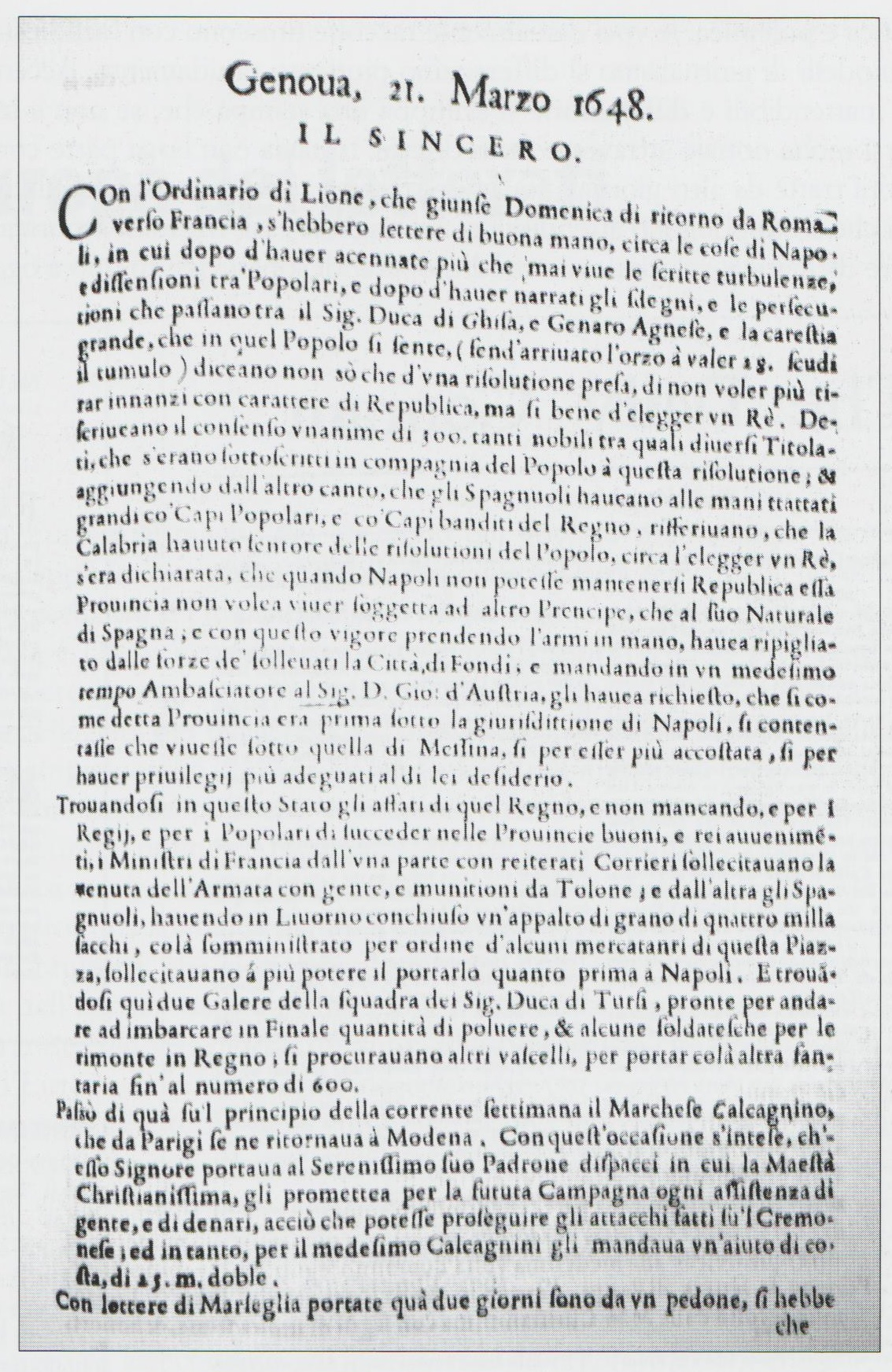
- Issue of 21 March 1648
- Type: Weekly
- Publisher: Gio. Maria Farroni
- Editor: Alessandro Botticelli, Luca Assarino
- Founded: 1642
- Ceased publication: July 29, 1684
- Language: Italian
- City: Genoa

Genova (or Di Genova) was a newspaper published in Genoa from 1642 to 1684. This newspaper had sometimes additional titles: in a few issues the addition was Il Sincero, (Note: the issues dated 21 Mar 1648; 9 Jan, 20 Mar, 24 July 1649; 15 Jan 1650; 13 May 1651; 10 Jun, 17 Jun, 1 Jul 1656.) other issues had the additional title Il Botticelli, (Note: from 31 Jan 1665 to 4 Jul 1665.) while two issues had only as title the year in Latin digits. (Note: the issues dated 8 and 29 July 1684.)

This newspaper was founded and initially edited by Alessandro Botticelli (from 1646 to 1660 edited by Luca Assarino), and it supported the pro-French faction in the politic of the Republic of Genoa. It shall not be confused with the newspaper with the same title founded in 1639 by Michele Castelli and tied to the pro-Spanish faction.

== History ==
In response to the publication of the pro-Spanish newspaper edited by Michele Castelli since 1639, the pro-French faction in the Republic of Genoa supported the publishing of a newspaper near to its leanings. This newspaper, always named Genova, started the publications before April 1642 even if the older issue still in existence is dated 11 June 1644. The title Di Genova (in English: of Genoa) was kept till 9 July 1644, later it was titled simply Genova. It was published weekly on Saturdays. The printer up to 25 November 1656 was Giovanni Maria Farroni, (Note: Giovanni Maria Farroni was born in 1600. He was a printer in Tortona and moved to Genova in 1635. He died in 1657.) later it changed quite quickly, including Pietro Giovanni Calenzani, Francesco Meschini and Gerolamo Marino.

The editor, who obtained the authorization to print, was Alessandro Botticelli, who previously was a writer of hand-writing newssheets. He continued till 1646, the year in which the pro-French faction intimidated the editor of the other newspaper. The issue of 28 April 1646 was prepared by Giacomo Maria Veronese, and from that month until October 1660 the newspaper passed to Luca Assarino, a well-known writer, journalist and informer. Under Assarino the newspaper supported the rights of Christine of France as ruler of the Duchy of Savoy against Thomas Francis and cardinal Maurice of Savoy supported by Spain.

In the meantime Botticelli returned to his work as writer of handwritten avvisi, also supporting the pro-Spanish faction, a job he carried out until 1668. (Note: Botticelli's handwritten avvisi of the year 1668, always titled Genova, are kept in the Manuscript 421 of the Archivio di Stato di Genova.) Since 1657 Botticelli however returned to contribute to the Genova of Assarino, along with other journalists such as father G.B. Noceti and Tommaso Oderico. In 1660 Luca Assarino moved to Milan and Botticelli took back the newspaper, which he run at least up to 1665.

The newspaper derived directly from hand-writing newssheets, and because of that it could have issues published the same day with different contents, addressed to different readers or just updated in the same day after the receipt of more recent news. The main sources of information were hand-writing newssheets received by ship from France, Spain, Lyon or by courier from Milan, as well as information obtained often illegally from the palaces of the government. It had four pages in a double format compared to a book (about 21.5x32 cm). It contained political and military news from Italy and abroad. The news about Genoa were limited to a few lines about the main public events, and no advertisement was present.

From July 1657 to 5 January 1658 the publishing was interrupted due to the plague in Genoa. In 1669 the Senate of the Republic of Genoa strengthened the censorship over the newspaper, in December 1671 the Senate forbade to print the name of the town of printing in order to keep the Republic free from possible charges due to false or disrespectful news.

On 7 January 1682 the Republic forbade the printing of newspaper and all hand-writing newssheets. However, after April 1682 the publication continued and are known two issues dated 8 and 29 July 1684, which was the latest issue published.

At least one case of plagiarism of the newspaper Genova is known: the issues of 1 and 22 July 1656 where illegally copied and printed in Bologna by the printer Giacomo Monti.
