= Genova (newspaper 1639–1646) =

Former newspaper published in Genoa from 1639 to 1646

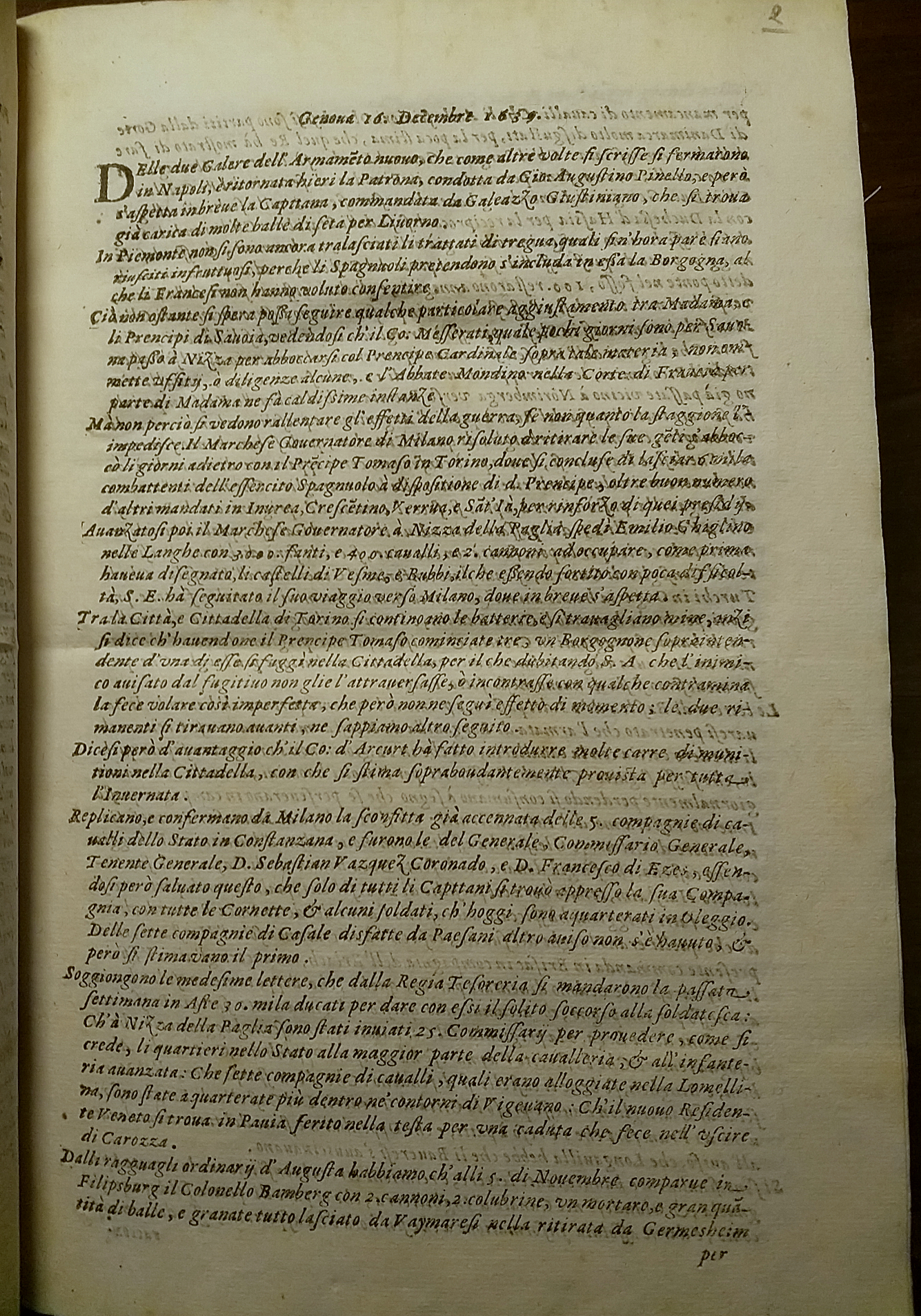
- issue 16 Dec 1639
- Type: Weekly
- Publisher: Pier Giovanni Calenzano
- Editor: Michele Castelli
- Founded: July 15, 1639
- Ceased publication: December 15, 1646
- Language: Italian
- City: Genoa

Genova (or Di Genova) was a newspaper published in Genoa from 1639 to 1646. The issue dated 29 July 1639 is the oldest issue still in existence of a newspaper printed in Italy. (Note: The issue of 29 July 1639 is conserved in the Biblioteca universitaria di Genova.)

This newspaper was founded and edited by Michele Castelli, (Note: Michele Castelli was born on about 1600 not in Genoa. He is known as editor of the Genova from 1639 to 1646, when he left Genoa to go possibly to Lucca. The last information about him is dated 1647 when the Senate of Genoa decided to investigate a writing of him considered defamatory for the Republic.) and it supported the pro-Spanish faction in the politic of the Republic of Genoa. This newspaper edited by Michele Castelli shall not be confused with another newspaper printed in Genoa from 1642 to 1684, always titled Genova, but founded by Alessandro Botticelli and tied to the pro-French faction, and sometimes known as Il Sincero.

Scholars suppose that the first newspaper printed in Italy was edited in Florence in 1636 by Amador Massi and Lorenzo Landi, but no issue was discovered to confirm that conjecture, therefore the Genova newspaper, printed from 1639, shall be considered the oldest printed newspaper in Italy.

== History ==
The government of the Republic of Genoa on 18 July 1639 (Note: with a decree of the Inquisitors of the Republic now kept in the State Archives of Genoa.) authorized the printer Pier Giovanni Calenzano (1595—1668) and the editor-in-chief Michele Castelli to continue the publishing of a newspaper, which had at least a number issued on the previous 15 July. The first two issues were titled Di Genova (in English: of Genoa), and all later issues had simply Genova as the title.

The newspaper Genova was issued weekly on Fridays up to 1642 when it started to be issued on Saturdays. It was four pages in a double format compared to a book (about 21.5x32 cm). It contained political and military news from Italy and abroad. The news about Genoa was limited to a few lines about the main public events, and no advertisement was present. The newspaper derived directly from hand-writing newssheets. The main sources of information were hand-writing newssheets received by ship from France, Spain, Lyon or by courier from Milan, as well as information often obtained illegally from the palaces of the government.

The authorization to print was granted every three years: in 1639 and 1642 for free, while in 1645 against a high fee. That authorization, differently than in other states of Italy, was granted to the editor not to the printer. The printer, not always indicated, was Pier Giovanni Calenzano except for the issue of 17 February 1640 printed by Gio. Maria Farroni e Compagni.

Michele Castelli, who edited the newspaper helped by his son Alessandro, was initially supported by the patricians Alessandro and Agostino Pallavicino (Doge of Genoa 1637-39). He sided with the pro-Spanish faction in the politic of the Republic of Genoa. In 1642 another newspaper started to be printed in Genoa with the same name: it was edited by Alessandro Botticelli and tied to the pro-French faction. However, in the 1640s the pro-French faction became more and more strong and the Castellis were intimidated by their political opponents: on 17 February 1646 they left Genoa for one year and they also left the newspaper, which passed to Michele Oliva and his son Giovanni Battista.

At the end of the same 1646 Giovanni Battista Oliva was murdered, and this determined the end of the publications. The last issue published was dated 15 December 1646.

Starting from 1640 the newspaper Genova was illegally copied and printed in Florence by Amador Massi and Lorenzo Landi. (Note: An online collection of plagiarized newssheets printed in Florence by Massi and Landi, including issues named Genova, is available at shelfmark Urb.lat.1621 of Vatican Library.) Notwithstanding the remonstrances of Pier Giovanni Calenzano the plagiarism continued also in 1643.
