= Government gazette =

Periodical publication

The last issue of the government gazette of Portuguese Macau with farewell messages from the Portuguese leadership.

The first issue of the government gazette of Macau under Chinese rule, published on the following day

A government gazette (also known as an official gazette, official journal, official newspaper, official monitor or official bulletin) is a periodical publication that has been authorised to publish public or legal notices. It is usually established by statute or official action, and publication of notices within it, whether by the government or a private party, is usually considered sufficient to comply with legal requirements for public notice. Gazettes are published either in print, electronically or both.

== History ==
In Ancient Rome, Acta Diurna, or government announcement bulletins, were produced. They were carved in metal or stone and posted in public places. In China, early government-produced news-sheets, called Dibao, circulated among court officials during the late Han dynasty (second and third centuries AD). Between 713 and 734, the Kaiyuan Za Bao ("Bulletin of the Court") of the Chinese Tang dynasty published government news; it was handwritten on silk and read by government officials. In 1582, there was the first reference to privately published newssheets in Beijing, during the late Ming dynasty.

In early modern Europe, the increased cross-border interaction created a rising need for information which was met by concise handwritten news-sheets. In 1556, the government of Venice first published the monthly notizie scritte, which cost one gazetta, a small coin. These avvisi were handwritten newsletters and used to convey political, military, and economic news quickly and efficiently to Italian cities (1500–1700)—sharing some characteristics of newspapers though usually not considered true newspapers. However, none of these publications fully met the classical criteria for proper newspapers, as they were typically not intended for the general public and restricted to a certain range of topics.

== Publication within privately owned periodicals ==
In some jurisdictions, privately owned newspapers may also register with the public authorities in order to publish public and legal notices. Likewise, a private newspaper may be designated by the courts for publication of legal notices. These are referred to as "legally adjudicated newspapers".

== See also ==
- List of government gazettes
- List of British colonial gazettes
- Journals of legislative bodies
- Annals
- Newspaper of record
