= History of Chinese newspapers =

The forerunners of newspapers in China took the form of government bulletins such as the Peking Gazette. Newspapers as known in the West were first published in China in the early 19th century. Some were in the English language rather than Chinese, and many were allied with Christian missionary endeavours.

== Terminology ==
Bao zhi (Chinese: 報紙; pinyin: bào zhǐ) means newspaper. In this context, bao means to announce, inform or report; zhi simply means paper.

== News in ancient history ==
Chinese language periodicals goes back to the Spring and Autumn Annals, and traces through more than a thousand years of tipao, including Kaiyuan Za Bao and the Peking Gazette. The Peking Gazette was published daily until 1912. As this publication was intended for government officials only, it is not considered a true newspaper. However, it was widely read by others.

The proper newspaper was introduced relatively late in the Far East, as a result of Western influence and the adoption of the printing press:

The East Asian press was studied relatively late in the West. One of the reasons is that newspapers did not exist in China, Japan, and Korea until these countries opened to Western influences. There were certainly forerunners of newsprint also in the indigenous tradition, like the famous Peking Gazette (Jingpao) which is often claimed to be oldest newspaper of the world. We find numerous little articles in Western papers on the Jingbao, usually from secondary or tertiary sources; they do not take into account that this gazette had limited circulation and that it just contained edicts and decrees – thus it does not fit the modern definition of newspaper. But it definitely was a forerunner of newsprint.

Newspapers of the last century including today's newspapers of the People's Republic of China, Chinese newspapers overseas, and earlier papers such as Shen Bao, Xin Wen Bao, Zi Lin Xi Hu Bao, Ta Kung Pao also draw upon other influences in the history of newspapers.

== News in modern times ==
The first reference to privately published news sheets in China is in 1582 in Beijing, during the late Ming dynasty; China Monthly Magazine, which published from 1815 to 1821, marked the beginning of Chinese journalism. It was managed by Robert Morrison, and was printed in Malacca using traditional woodblock printing. It was primarily a Christian missionary organ, although it did include some news.

China's first Western-style newspaper, the Portuguese-language A Abelha da China was established in 1822, followed by the English-language Canton Register in 1827. This was followed in 1835 by the Canton Press, another English-language newspaper. The Chinese-language Eastern Western Magazine was published from 1833 to 1838. This magazine included far more news than China Monthly Magazine, and also commentary. The British Bible Society imported a cylinder printer in 1847, China's first powered printing machine. In the 1860s, William Dill Gamble, from Ramelton, Ireland, working at American Presbyterian Mission Press in Shanghai, applied electrotype technology to the problem of Chinese typography to create "Meihua type." This revolutionary innovation remained an industry standard for the rest of the 19th century. Gamble's techniques were also adopted in Japan. North China Daily News, an English-language paper, was published in Shanghai from 1850 to 1941. This was a weekly until 1864, when it began publishing daily. The paper published a Chinese-language edition, Shanghai Xinbao, beginning in 1861.

Chinese-language missionary journalism restarted with China Serial, published in Hong Kong from 1853 to 1856. Wanguo Gongbao (A Review of the Times), the most influential Chinese publication of the 19th century, was published from 1868 to 1907.

== See also ==
- Newspapers of the People's Republic of China#History
- List of the earliest newspapers
