= Peking Gazette =

Government bulletin issued by the Imperial Government of China until 1912

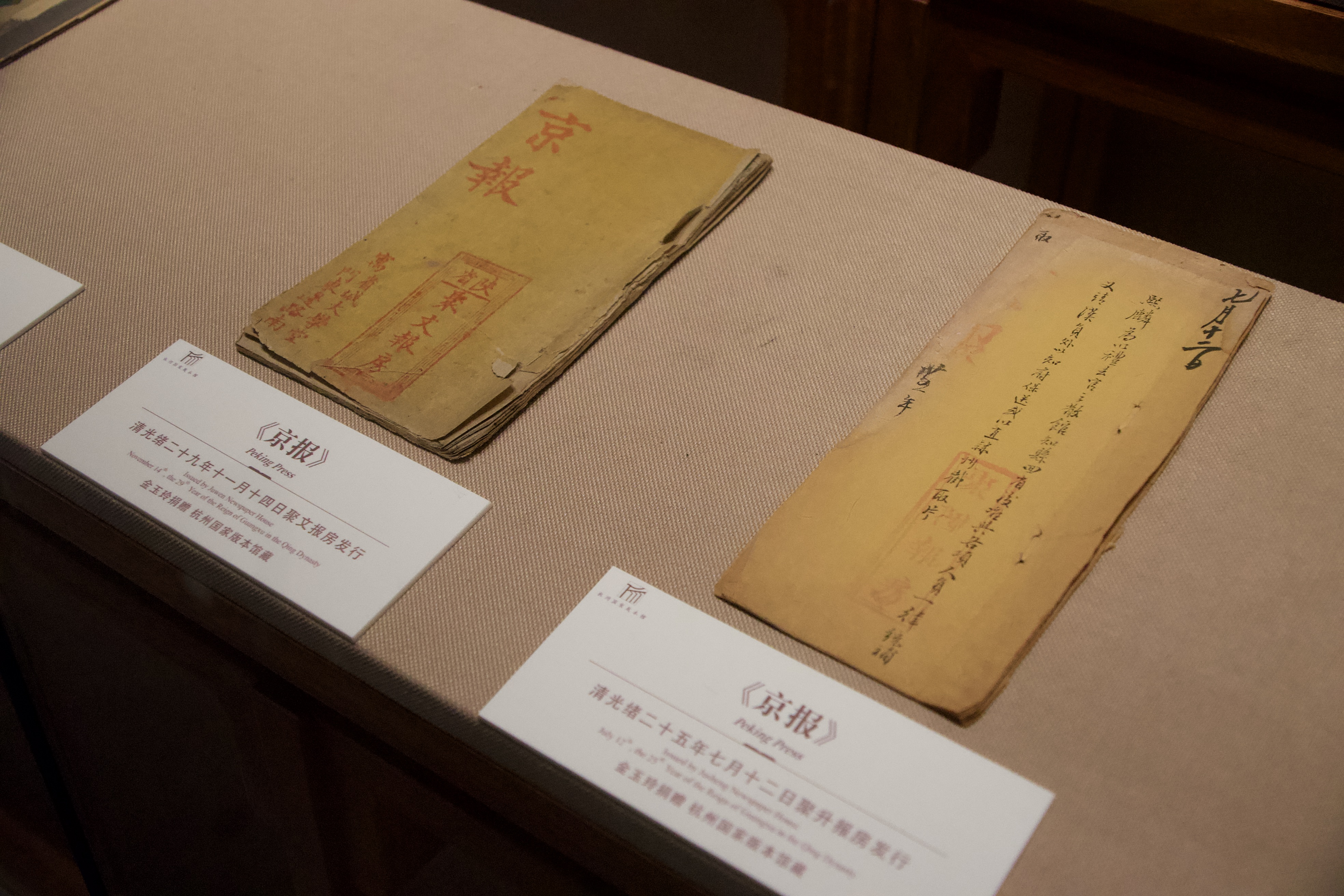
Bulletins at the Hangzhou branch of the China National Archives of Publications and Culture

The Peking Gazette was an official bulletin published with changing frequency in Beijing until 1912, when the Qing dynasty fell and Republican China was born. The translated name, as it is known to Western sources, comes from Ming dynasty-era Jesuits, who followed the bulletin for its political contents. The Peking Gazette became a venue for political grievances and infighting during the reign of the Wanli Emperor in the late Ming dynasty, when literati factions would submit politicized memorials that the Emperor often abstained from reviewing. From around 1730, the publication was in Chinese called Jing Bao (京报, sometimes transliterated Ching Pao), literally "the Capital Report". It contained information on court appointments, edicts, and the official memorials submitted to the emperor, and the decisions made or deferred.

Author J.C. Sun in his book Modern Chinese Press, published in 1946, said the Gazette seemed to have been

designed entirely for officers of the Chinese Government, and its publication to the people was merely by connivance contrary to law, as was formerly the case with regard the publication of parliamentary speeches in England. The recommendation of individuals for promotion, the impeachment of others, notices of removal from office and of rewards or degradations – these were the chief topics which filled its columns.

== Publication type ==
Contrary to a sometimes voiced belief, the Peking Gazette was not a newspaper, but a government bulletin, although it might be considered a distant precursor:

The East Asian press was studied relatively late in the West. One of the reasons is that newspapers did not exist in China, Japan, and Korea until these countries opened to Western influences. There were certainly forerunners of newsprint also in the indigenous tradition, like the famous Peking Gazette (Jingbao) which is often claimed to be oldest newspaper of the world. We find numerous little articles in Western papers on the Jingbao, usually from secondary or tertiary sources; they do not take into account that this gazette had limited circulation and that it just contained edicts and decrees – thus it does not fit the modern definition of newspaper. But it definitely was a forerunner of newsprint.

== See also ==
- Tipao
- Kaiyuan Za Bao
- History of Chinese newspapers
- List of the earliest newspapers
