= Royal Gold Coast Gazette and Commercial Intelligencer =

The Royal Gold Coast Gazette and Commercial Intelligence was a newspaper published in Cape Coast between April 1822 and December 1823.

It was established by Charles MacCarthy, governor of the British colony of the Gold Coast at the time. The paper was written by hand.
