= Acta Diurna =

Daily official gazette of Ancient Rome

Acta Diurna (Latin for Daily Acts, sometimes translated as Daily Public Records or as Daily Gazette) were daily Roman official notices, a sort of daily gazette. They were carved on stone or metal and presented in message boards in public places such as the Forum of Rome. They also were called simply Acta. In many ways, they functioned like an early newspaper for the Roman citizenry. The Acta were begun in 59 BC and continued until AD 222.

== History ==
Acta Diurna, also called Acta Populi, Acta Publica, and simply Acta or Diurna, in ancient Rome was a sort of daily government gazette, containing an officially authorized narrative of noteworthy events at Rome. Its contents were partly official (court news, decrees of the Roman emperor, Roman Senate, and Roman magistrates), and partly private (notices of births, marriages, and deaths). Thus, to some extent it filled the place of the modern newspaper.

The origin of the Acta is attributed to Julius Caesar, who first ordered the keeping and publishing of the acts of the people by public officers (59 B.C.; Suetonius, Caesar, 20). The Acta were drawn up from day to day, and exposed in a public place on a whitened board called an Album. After remaining there for a reasonable time they were taken down and preserved with other public documents, so that they might be available for purposes of research.

The Acta differed from the Annals (which were discontinued in 133 BC) in that only the greater and more important matters were given in the latter, while in the former things of less note were recorded. Their publication continued till the transference of the seat of the empire to Constantinople. There are no genuine fragments extant.

Sometimes scribes made copies of the Acta and sent them to governors for information. Later emperors used them to announce royal or senatorial decrees and events of the court. Other forms of Acta were legal, municipal, and military notices.

Acta Diurna introduced the expression “publicare et propagare”, which means "make public and propagate". This expression was set in the end of the texts and proclaimed a release to both Roman citizens and non-citizens.

== See also ==
- Dibao (ancient Chinese gazette)
