= Michael Schudson =

American sociologist and professor

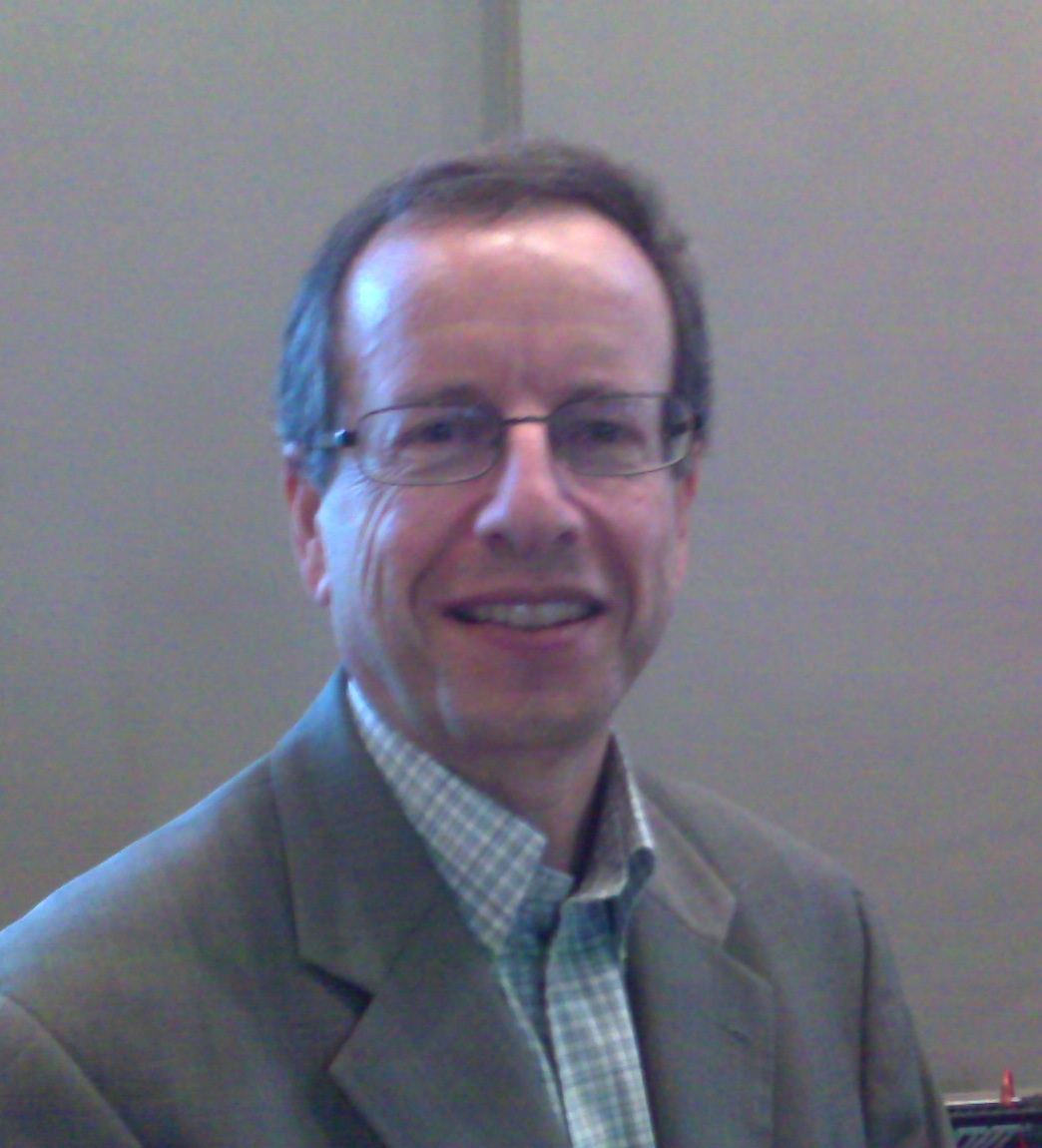
Michael S. Schudson

Michael S. Schudson (born November 3, 1946) is professor of journalism in the graduate school of journalism of Columbia University and adjunct professor in the department of sociology. He is professor emeritus at the University of California, San Diego. He is an expert in the fields such as journalism history, media sociology, political communication, and public culture.

== Biography ==
Schudson grew up in Milwaukee, Wisconsin. He received his BA from Swarthmore College (1969) and his MA (1970) and PhD (1976) from Harvard University in sociology. He taught at the University of Chicago from 1976 to 1980 and the University of California, San Diego, from 1980 to 2009. From 2006 to 2009, he was on the faculty of both University of California, San Diego, and Columbia. He has been working full-time at Columbia since 2009.

Schudson has received major awards such as a Guggenheim Fellowship, a residential fellowship at the Center for Advanced Study in the Behavioral Sciences at Stanford University, and a MacArthur "genius" fellowship. On being named a MacArthur fellow in 1990, the foundation identified him as "an interpreter of public culture and of collective or civic memory". He was awarded an honorary doctorate from the University of Groningen in 2014.

Schudson lives in New York City and is married to communication scholar Julia Sonnevend.

== Work ==
Schudson is the author of seven books and editor of three others concerning the history and sociology of American journalism, the history of United States citizenship and political participation, advertising, popular culture, book publishing, and cultural memory. His books, Discovering the News (Basic Books, 1978), Advertising, the Uneasy Persuasion (Basic Books, 1984), The Good Citizen: A History of American Civic Life (Free Press, 1998), The Sociology of News (W. W. Norton, 2003, 2011), and Why Democracies Need an Unlovable Press (Polity Press, 2008); all have been published in Chinese translation. His other works include Watergate in American Memory (Basic Books, 1992); The Power of News (Harvard University Press, 1995), Reading the News (Pantheon, 1986), co-edited with Robert K. Manoff; Rethinking Popular Culture (University of California Press, 1991), co-edited with Chandra Mukerji; and The Enduring Book (vol. 5 of The History of the Book in America, University of North Carolina Press, 2009), co-edited with David Paul Nord and Joan Shelley Rubin.

His books are reviewed in both specialized and general publications. The Journal of American History judged The Good Citizen (1998) to be "relevant, imaginative, and determined to face facts" and The Economist urged all Americans to read it. Times Higher Education (UK) called Why Democracies Need an Unlovable Press (2008) "eloquent and wise".

Schudson publishes in both academic and general-interest journals. In the Winter 2019 edition of the Columbia Journalism Review he authored a history of "trust" issues related to journalistic reporting in the United States, a historical review of such issues, and the origin of the term, "the media", that is entitled, The Fall, Rise, and Fall of Media Trust. He offered an assessment of whether and how trust may be cultivated by journalists and publishers. Its subtitle is, "There are worse things than being widely disliked".

He is co-author, with Leonard Downie Jr., of a report on the future of news, The Reconstruction of American Journalism (2009), that was sponsored by the Columbia Journalism School.

== Books ==
- Discovering the News: A Social History of American Newspapers (1978) ISBN 978-0-465-01666-2
- Advertising, the Uneasy Persuasion (1984) ISBN 978-0-465-00079-1
- Reading the News (1986) editor with Robert K. Manoff ISBN 978-0-394-74649-4
- Rethinking Popular Culture: Contemporary Perspectives in Cultural Studies (1991) editor with Chandra Mukerji ISBN 978-0-520-06893-3
- Watergate in American Memory: How We Remember, Forget and Reconstruct the Past (1992) ISBN 978-0-465-09084-6
- The Power of News (1995) ISBN 978-0-674-69587-0
- The Good Citizen: A History of American Civic Life (1998) ISBN 978-0-674-35640-5
- The Sociology of News (2003, 2011) ISBN 978-0-393-97513-0
- Why Democracies Need an Unlovable Press (2008) ISBN 978-0745-64452-3
- The Enduring Book (vol. 5 of The History of the Book in America) (2009) editor with David Paul Nord and Joan Shelley Rubin ISBN 978-0-807-83285-1

=== Journalism: Why It Matters ===
Schudson's 2020 book, Journalism: Why It Matters examines the value of journalism in everyday life, and argue why the craft still matters. Schudson makes his case through several short chapters on a variety of claims. The concise 120-page book was originally published in April 2020 as part of Polity’s “Why It Matters” series, containing short and lively books that aim to inspire a new generation of students. Chapters include topics on types of meaningful journalism, media bias, technology, and journalism's "non-revolutions." Although the industry of news and media is constantly changing, Schudson makes an argument that journalism still matters. He poises this stance on the audience in which journalism serves. News offers a factual, useful, documented approach to public issues and holds powerful accountable. Despite arguments against the craft and partisan media outlets, this book challenges skeptics and underscores the good in journalism. In fact, Schudson argues that we are living in the golden age of journalism. He holds faith for the next generation of curious, driven reporters who want to improve journalism in their own career paths and offers advice on how to do so. In article written for Pew Research Center by Jesse Holcomb titled Media Mistrust Has Been Growing for Decades—Does it Matter? Holcomb writes, "“A third myth views mistrust as inherently a bad thing, a phenomenon that must be reversed. Columbia University journalism historian Michael Schudson has argued that mistrust might mean that journalists are actually doing their jobs, particularly when reporters deliver unwelcome news about a party or politician or public figures.”
