= Dibao (ancient Chinese gazette) =

Type of publication in imperial China

Dibao (Chinese: 邸報; pinyin: dǐbào; Wade–Giles: ti^{3}-pao^{4}; lit. 'reports from the [official] residences') were a type of publications issued by central and local governments in imperial China, which was the only official government newspaper published by the ancient Chinese central government in different dynasties. 'Dibao' is a general term to describe the ancient Chinese gazette. Historically, there were different types of names used to describe Dibao in different dynasties among the imperial Chinese history. While closest in form and function to gazettes in the Western world, they have also been called "palace reports" or "imperial bulletins". Different sources place Dibao's first publication as early as the Han dynasty (206 BCE–220 CE), which would make Dibao amongst the earliest newspapers in the world, or as late as the Tang dynasty (June 18, 618 – June 4, 907) according to the earliest verified and proved Dibao with historical relics. Dibao was continuously published among different imperial dynasties until the last imperial emperor in the Qing dynasty, Puyi, abdicated in 1912.

Dibao contained official political edicts, announcements, and news from the Chinese imperial central government or local governments, which would be delivered to inform both the central and local governments by messengers periodically and were intended to be seen only by bureaucrats (and a given dibao might only be intended for a certain subset of bureaucrats). Selected items from a gazette might then be conveyed to local citizenry by word of mouth and/or posted announcements. Frequency of publication varied widely over time and place. Before the invention of moveable type printing they were hand-written or printed with engraved wooden blocks. The introduction of European-style Chinese language newspapers, along with the growing intersection of Chinese and global affairs generally, applied pressure for the Dibao to adapt, and circulation of the Beijing Gazette was in the tens of thousands by the time publication ceased altogether with the fall of the Qing dynasty in 1911. The gazettes from Beijing at this time were known as Jingbao (京報), literally "reports from the capital".

== Historical origin and the controversy ==
There are two main origin theories of Dibao: the Han dynasty origin theory and the Tang dynasty origin theory.

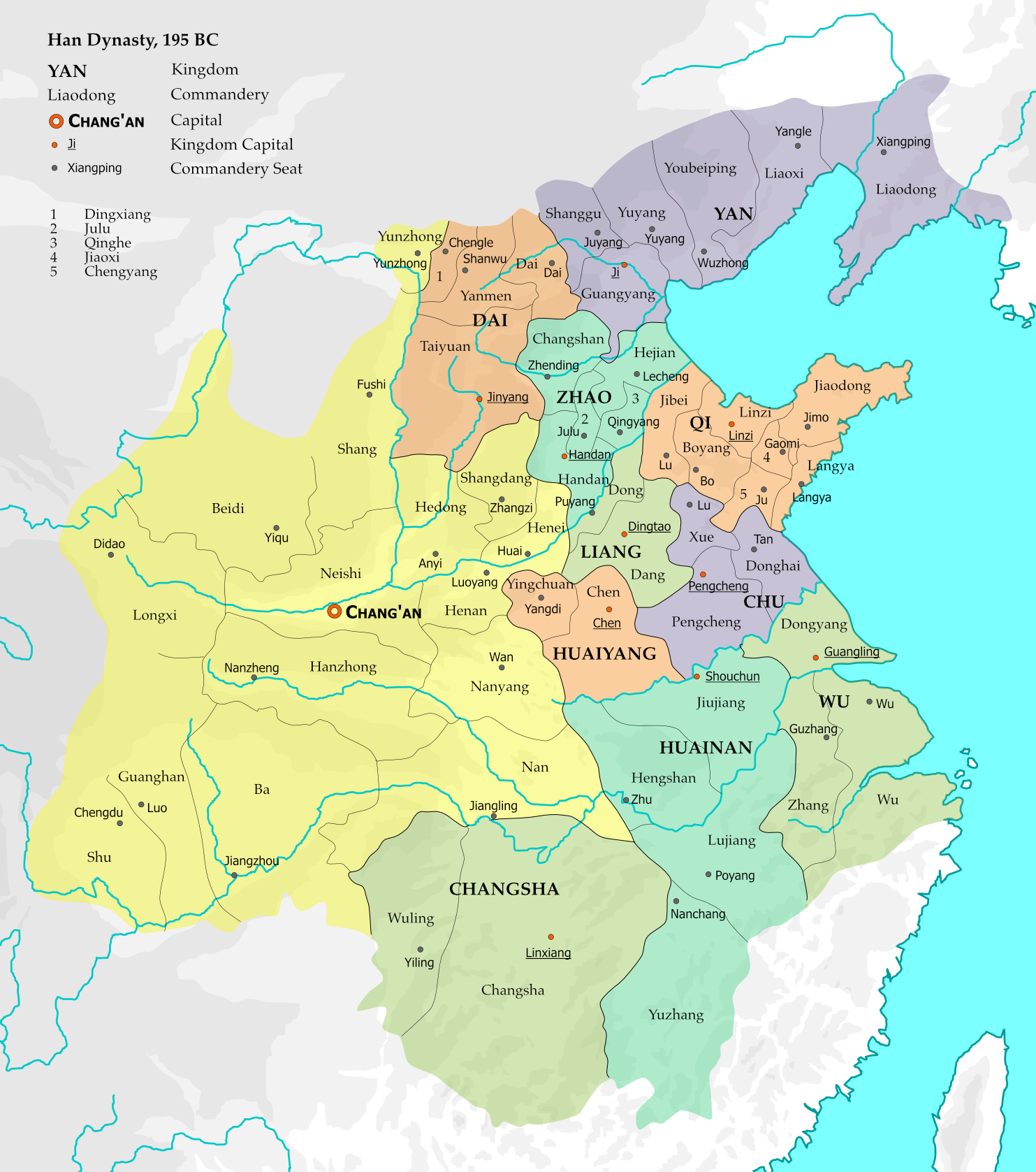
Kingdoms with the Jun-Xian system in the Han dynasty

=== Han dynasty origin theory ===
At the beginning of the Han dynasty, the Jun-Xian system (郡縣制) from the Qin dynasty was implemented to govern the country. The Jun-Xian system is a county system that divided the country into 100 Juns and 1400 Xians, which were the subnational governments that owned the right of autonomy to govern the local issues. Under the Jun-Xian system, the county governments were required to report the local affairs to the central government and receive the edicts and political decisions from the central government, which took much time to deliver and receive the information. Di (邸), which literally means the 'subnational government officers' residence in the capital', was instituted to solve the intelligence transmission issues and made it more efficient for the Jun-Xian system. Although Di was instituted in the capital, it was not an official administrative department in the ancient Chinese political system because Di was founded by county governments without the official permission from the central government. Di had two functions: to transmit the information, and provide food and accommodation for messengers. Messengers who came and stayed in Di would collect information from the central government, which was called 'Bao'(報), and wrote it on the bamboo slips during the Western Han period, and afterwards on paper in the Eastern Han period. The information written on paper and transmitted from Di to the counties was called 'Dibao'.

=== Tang dynasty Origin theory and Origin controversy ===
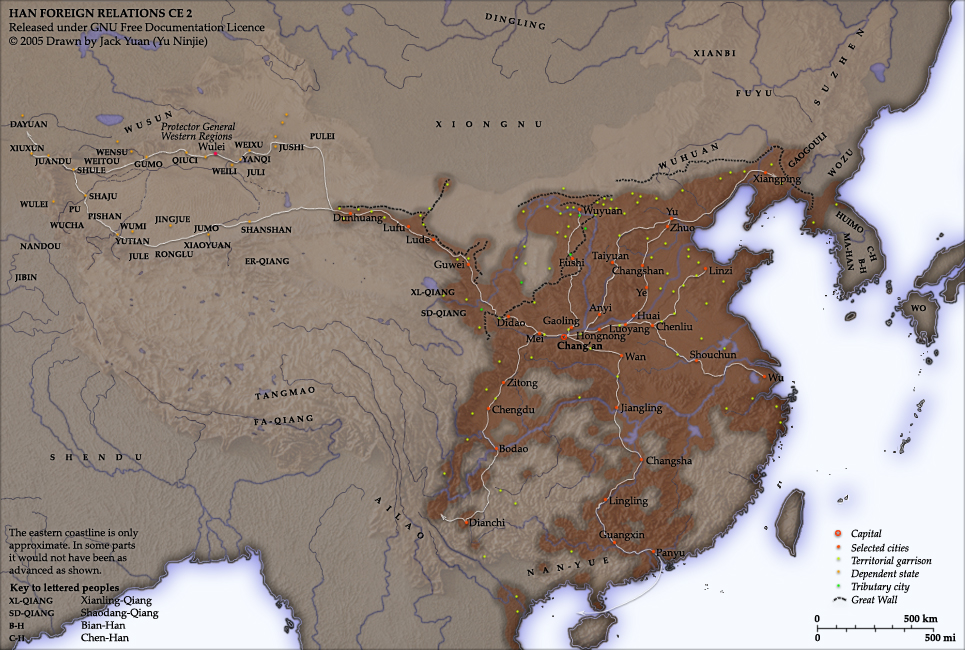
Xiongnu on the north of the Han dynasty

Historians who support the Han dynasty origin theory argue that the historical information about Dibao in the Han dynasty had been recorded in several imperial historical texts among many dynasties. Xihan Huiya (西漢會要), literally 'Institutional history of the Western Han dynasty', written by Xu Tianlin in the Song dynasty, records the Dibao delivery situation in the Han dynasty based on the detailed information about the Jun-Xian system, which is used as reliable evidence to prove the existence of Dibao in the Han dynasty.

Historians who disagree with the Han dynasty Origin theory argue that Xihan Huiya, which is the only historical text that records Dibao in the Han dynasty, is used as indirect historical text evidence rather than direct historical relics evidence to prove the existence of Dibao in the Han dynasty. The earliest verified Dibao with historical text and relics was a Dibao called Kaiyuan Za Bao (開元雜報), which was published in the Kaiyuan period in the Tang dynasty during the 8th century. In Chinese imperial historical, there were many recordings written in historical texts that were not completely correct and provable as they could be falsified by historians throughout different imperial dynasties with different political and historical purposes. Historians also doubt the societal and economic conditions in the Han dynasty that if it was powerful enough to support the huge Dibao delivery system among 100 Juns and 1400 Xians because the continuous wars with the northern Xiongnu (匈奴) nomadic nation continuously weakened the national strength of the Han dynasty.

== Content ==
There was little alteration in the content of Dibao in imperial Chinese history since it was first published in the Han dynasty. There were four main aspects of the Dibao content:

=== The daily life of the emperor ===
Under the influence of traditional Chinese ideology based on Confucianism, it was significant for both the publisher and reader to know the speech and behaviour of the emperor because the emperor in ancient China was regarded as the pivot of the whole empire, who played the most important role to govern the country. The speeches and behaviours of the emperor would be recorded by the imperial historians surrounding him, which was not only a way for the emperor to ensure the legitimacy of governance and unite the country, but also a way to for the citizen to supervise the speeches and behaviours of the emperor. Everything related to the emperor's daily life, such as the important speeches, summons, hunts, religious duties, conferment and award ceremonies would be written by the imperial historians on books and published on Dibao.

=== The significant edict, political decision, and decree ===
Kaiyuan Za Bao 開元雜報
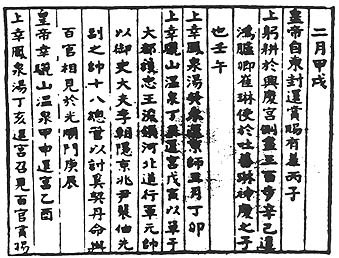

In the Song dynasty, legislation became an official part of Dibao that published periodically, which involved the new edicts, penal laws, political decisions from the emperor on the memorial to the throne (Chinese: Zouzhang/奏章). Memorials to the throne from the local government would be written carefully with the specific honorific format to transmit the information from different regions to the imperial court first, which will be discussed and selected by the imperial court, then transferred to the emperor to review. The memorial to the throne would be published on Dibao with the comments and decisions with the permission of the emperor. Memorials to the throne that were not allowed to publish on Dibao would be marked by the emperor as 'Liuzhong (留中)', which literally means 'leave in the palace', because the content on it was not proper to publish on Dibao. Kaiyuan Za bao records a memorial to the throne about a new type of grape brought from the western region in the Han dynasty, which was marked as reviewed and commented with 'boring' by the emperor and not allowed to publish on Dibao. Some memorials to the throne were requested to 'Liuzhong' by the local government as they involved significant national secrets in political and military fields that could not be published to the public. Both the edicts and decisions published on Dibao were used as evidences for the imperial court and government officials to engage the government affairs.

=== The dynamic of the imperial court ===
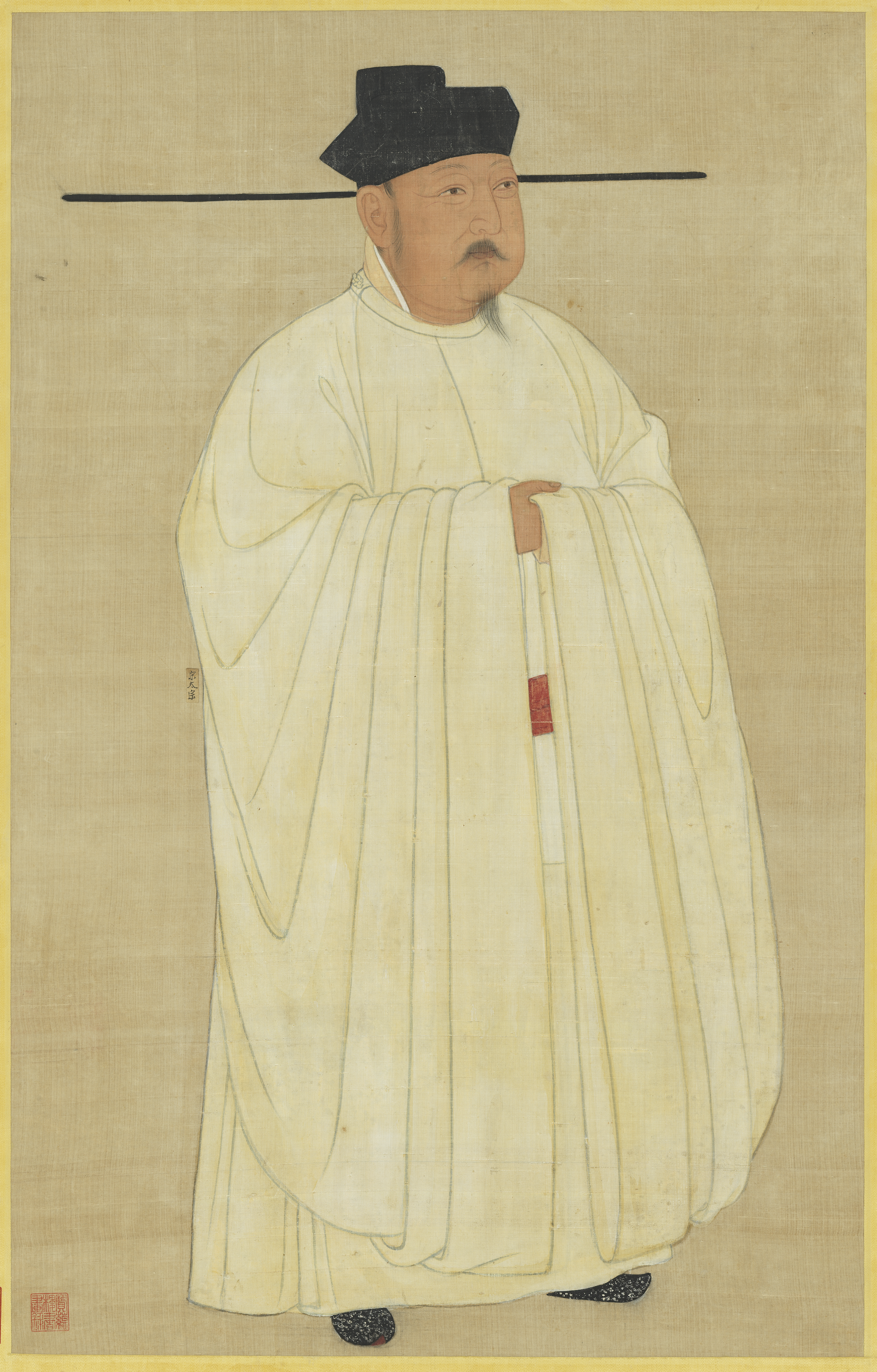
Emperor Taizong of Song (宋太宗)

The dynamic of the imperial court became the official content on Dibao in the Song dynasty, where the emperor published the changes on the appointment and dismission of the government officials in the imperial court and the local governments. In the Song dynasty, Emperor Taizu of Song (宋太祖) and Emperor Taizong of Song (宋太宗) enacted the policy of emphasising literature and restricting military force (重文輕武) to further enlarge the power of the emperor and weaken the power of the military to prevent the military coup and consolidate the domination of the empire, which led to increasing occupation requirement and the fierce competition of the government officials in the imperial political system. With the rising political party movements and conflicts, the dynamic of the imperial court and the appointment and dismission of the government officials that published on Dibao gradually became the most significant information source for both the civil officials and military officers to know the occupation demand of the government, understand and analyse the political circumstance of the empire in the Song dynasty. In the Ming dynasty and the Qing dynasty, the content published on Dibao related to the dynamic of the imperial court was further divided into three essential parts : Gongmenchao (宮門鈔), Shangyu (上諭) and Zouzhang (奏章). Gongmenchao, literally means 'the paper in the palace', involved the specific information about the imperial court and the appointment and dismission of the government officials, which would be discussed by the officials and selected by the emperor to publish on Dibao. Zouzhang, which is the memorial to the throne delivered to the emperor, would be selected, commented, then permitted by the emperor to publish on Dibao usually without the discussion with the government officials. Shangyu, which literally means 'the edict of the emperor', was the decisions that the emperor made on the memorials to the throne, which usually were the praises, awards, and the appointment and dismission of the government officials.

=== The report of military and diplomacy ===
The content related to the military, diplomacy and natural disaster that published on Dibao was controlled strictly on every imperial dynasty, which aimed to maintain the feudal governance, safeguard the interest of the ruling class, and ensure the stabilisation of the feudal society. The content about military action, especially related to the mutiny, peasant revolt, and the minority armed resistance, generally would not be allowed to publish on Dibao because they could disturb the popular mind and destroy the societal stabilisation and harmony, which can threaten the imperial regime and the authority of the ruling class directly. The content related to military and diplomacy that published on Dibao would be reviewed by the imperial court first, then further reviewed and selected by the emperor carefully because it was equal to official government documents, which was used as evidence and reference for the local governments to deal with the local affairs that played an important role in the imperial government organisation operation.

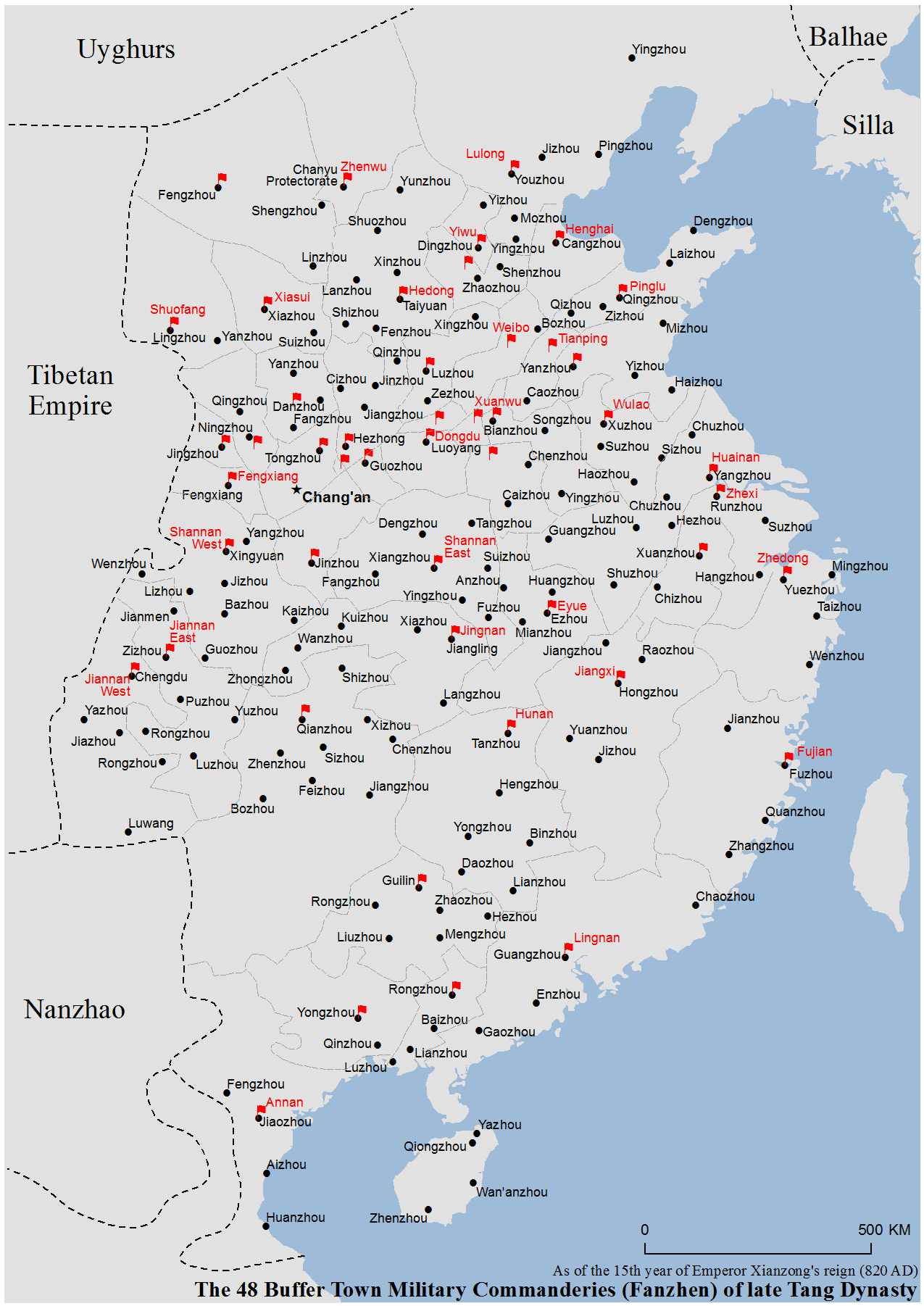
Fanzhen in the Tang dynasty

== Historical development ==
=== Tang dynasty ===
Both the historians who support the Han dynasty origin theory and the Tang dynasty origin theory agree that Dibao was developed in the Tang dynasty and started to form a stable delivery system between the local government and the central government. In the Tang dynasty, Fanzhen (藩鎮), literally means "buffer town", a governmental administration system through regional governors, was instituted to replace the Jun-Xian system. The messengers from different Fanzhens collected the information related to the imperial court and those could be beneficial for their Fanzhens, then wrote them on Dibao and delivered them to the Fanzhens. Dibao in the Tang dynasty did not publish periodically and did not have fixed content with headings. The imperial court and the emperor did not review and restrict the content written on Dibao because it only represented the Fanzhen governor, which was not the official gazette of the empire.

=== Song dynasty ===
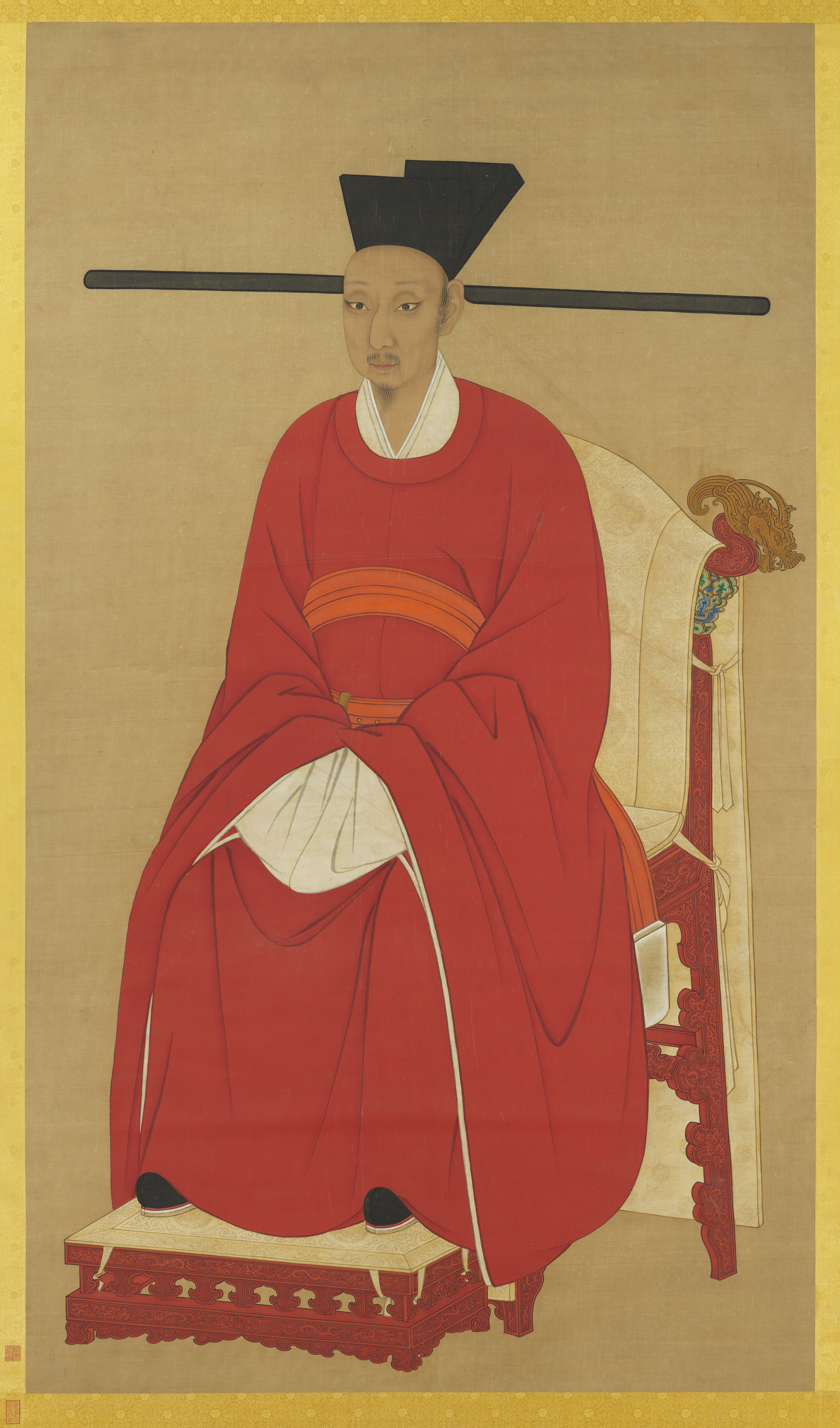
Emperor Ningzong of Song (宋寧宗)

Dibao became the official administrative department governed by the central government in the Song dynasty, which was the earliest official gazette instituted directly by the central government in the feudal society. Dibao in the Song dynasty started to publish the content periodically related to the daily life of the emperor, edicts and political decisions, the dynamic of the imperial court, and the reports of military, diplomacy and natural disaster as a result of the ruling classes attached great importance to the function of Dibao, which aimed to transmit the information, consolidate feudal governance, and protect the rights and interests of the ruling classes. In the Song dynasty, the function of Dibao gradually shifted to maintain the legitimacy of governance rather than supervising the edicts and decisions of the emperor and the government officials due to the development of high centralisation of authority with the policy of emphasising literature and restricting military force (重文輕武). The loss of the Northern Expedition war led by the emperor Ningzong of Song (宋寧宗) and the imperial military caused huge casualties, which ignited the anger of the public. A deep self-criticism written by the emperor Ningzong of Song was published on Dibao and delivered to the local governments and shown to the public, which presented the good image of the emperor that aimed to quell the public anger, increase the military morale, and maintain the image of the ruling class.

=== Ming dynasty ===
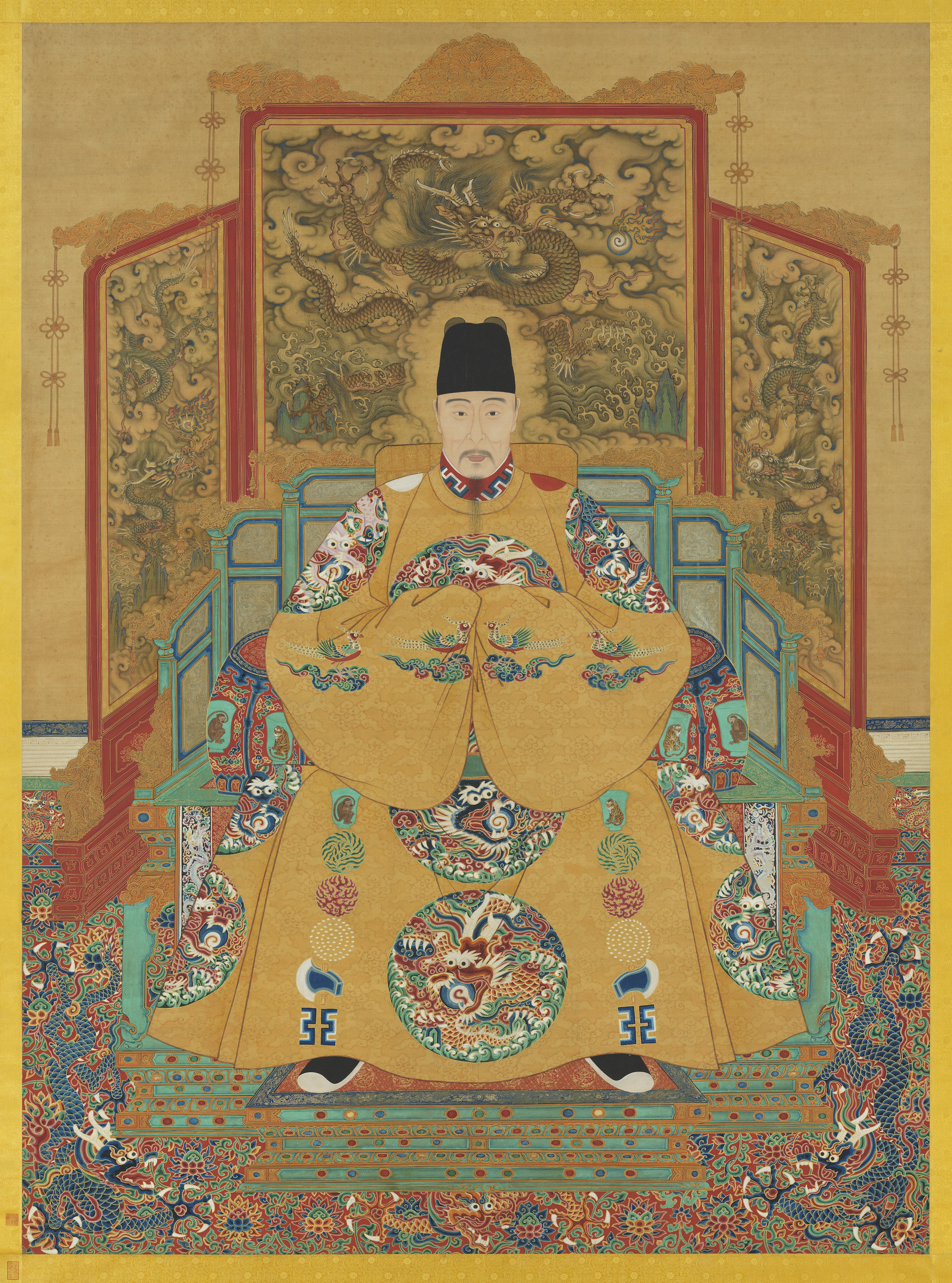
Jiajing Emperor (嘉靖皇帝/明世宗)

The social climate and the restriction on the Dibao in the Ming dynasty were not as strict as the Song dynasty although it was still aimed to maintain feudal governance of the empire. Historians believe the subtle balance of the power between the emperor and the government officials was because the emperor in the Ming dynasty understood the importance of the transparent political system as the Ming dynasty was established with the peasant revolt led by the political corrosion and corruption in the Yuan dynasty. Unlike the Dibao in the Song dynasty, the content published on Dibao in the Ming dynasty usually involved the conflicts and argument between the government officials and the emperor, sometimes even had the criticism on the edicts and decisions that the emperor made. Dibao in the Wanli (萬曆) period in the Ming dynasty published numerous criticism and opposition on the decision that the Wanli Emperor (明神宗/萬曆皇帝) planned to give the position of the crown prince to the son of imperial noble consort Zheng rather than the son of the empress, which was against the imperial law and led to the strong dissatisfaction of the public opinion and the government officials that forced the Wanli Emperor to withdraw his decision. In the 16th century before the establishment of the Qing dynasty, Nurhaci (努爾哈赤), the chieftain of Manchuria who afterward became the first emperor in the Qing dynasty, dispatched many spies to buy Dibao in the Ming Empire to collect the useful information due to high transparency it had.

=== Qing dynasty ===
The emperor in the Qing dynasty became the editor in chief of Dibao who completely controlled and managed the imperial propaganda and public opinion. Dibao in the Qing dynasty still had the right to publish the criticism and opposition like the Ming dynasty, but they were all reviewed and selected by the emperor before publishing. Jingbao (Peking Gazette; 京報), which literally means 'reports of the capital', became one of the imperial gazettes to publish with Dibao at the same time. The content published on Jingbao only involved the edicts and decisions, which was used as Bulletin Board for the public and foreign ambassadors. The content published on other Dibao was also allowed to only involve the edicts and decisions, which would be also selected by the emperor that aimed to make the content on all Dibao become the same as Jingbao and controlled all content published on each Dibao to further control the public opinion and consolidate feudal governance. In the Qing dynasty, publishers who published the content without the permission of the emperor on Dibao would be sentenced because it was a crime.

== See also ==
- Kaiyuan Za Bao
- List of the earliest newspapers
- Neican
- Acta Diurna
