= Kaiyuan Za Bao =

713–734 official Chinese publication

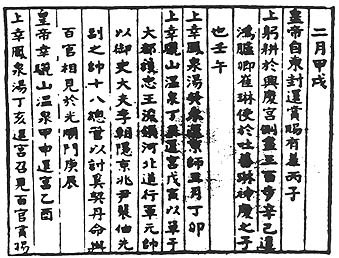
- Traditional Chinese: 開元雜報
- Simplified Chinese: 开元杂报
Transcriptions
Standard Mandarin
- Hanyu Pinyin: Kāiyuán Zá Bào

Kaiyuan Za Bao, or Kaiyuan Chao Bao, Bulletin of the Court, was an official publication which first appeared in the 8th century, during the Kaiyuan era. It has been described as the first Chinese newspaper or official gazette, and also as the world's first magazine. Its main subscribers were imperial officials. Every day the political news and domestic news were collected by the editors, and the writers transcribed it to send to the provinces. It was hand printed on silk, and appeared between 713 and 734.

== See also ==
- Tipao
- Peking Gazette
- List of the earliest newspapers
