= Portrait of Abraham Casteleyn and his Wife, Margaretha van Bancken =

1663 painting by Jan de Bray

Abraham Casteleyn and his Wife, Margarieta van Bancken
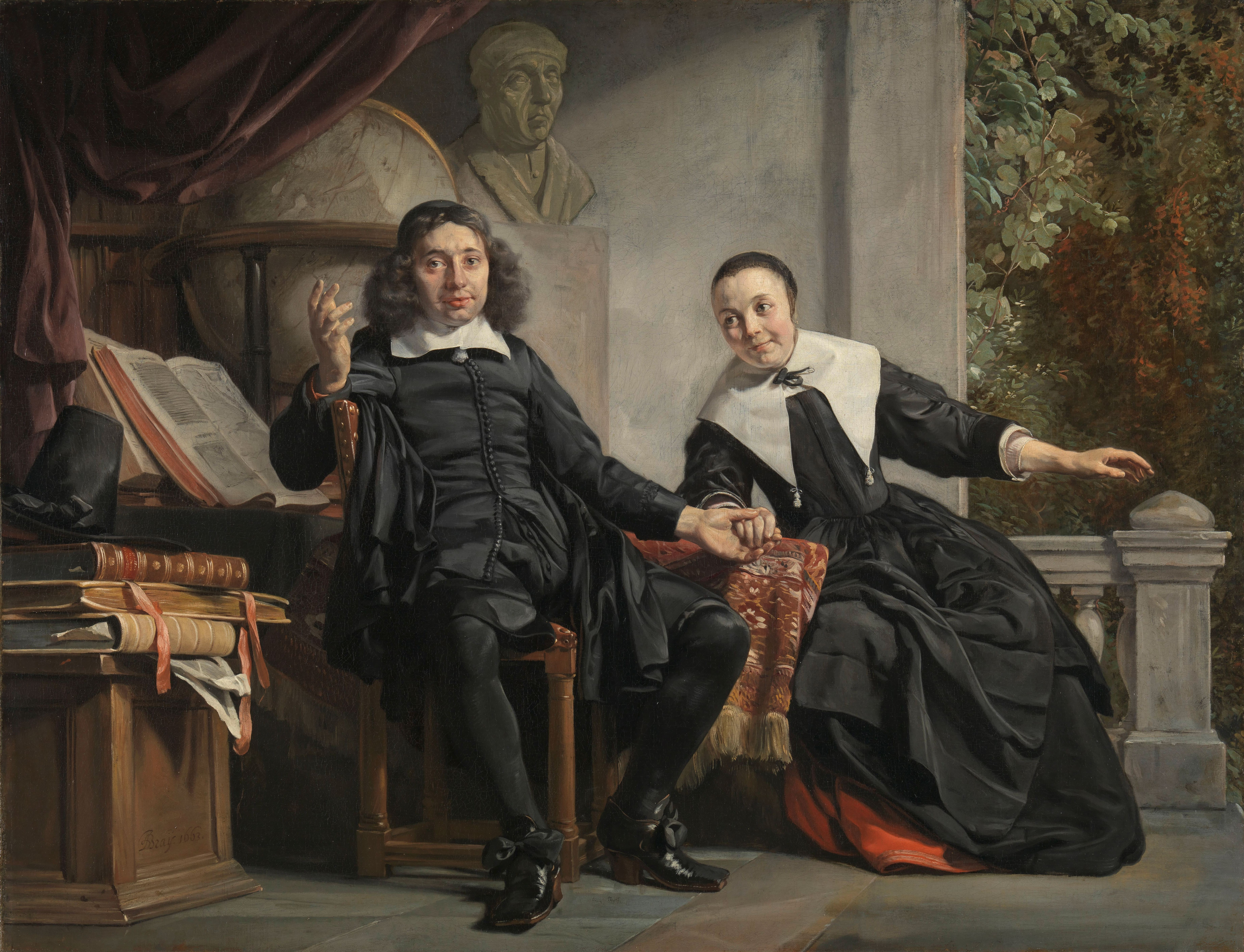
- Artist: Jan de Bray
- Year: 1663
- Medium: canvas, oil paint
- Dimensions: 83 cm (33 in) × 106.5 cm (41.9 in)
- Location: Rijksmuseum, Netherlands
- Accession no.: SK-A-3280
- Identifiers: RKDimages ID: 7109

Portrait of Abraham Casteleyn and his Wife, Margaretha van Bancken (1663) is an oil on canvas painting by the Dutch painter Jan de Bray; it is an example of Dutch Golden Age painting and is now in the Rijksmuseum.

This painting by De Bray was acquired in 1939 from the Frans Ernst Blaauw bequest. It had been in the family since 1834 and because of the globe on the left it was assumed to be a double portrait of Joan Blaeu (1596-1673) and his wife Geertruid Vermeulen (died 1676). The next year it was determined the couple was clearly too old at the time to be the youthful newlyweds portrayed in the painting, and it was speculated that they were therefore the son of Blaeu, Willem Blaeu II (1635-1685) and his wife Anna van Loon (1638-1680), though their ages didn't match either. Since the bust of Laurens Janszoon Coster features quite prominently above their portraits and De Bray himself was a Haarlem painter whose brother Dirck made engravings for the Casteleyn printing firm until he left town in 1678, it was finally correctly catalogued upon the discovery of a drawn self-portrait by Casteleyn in the North Holland Archives. The couple Abraham Casteleyn and Margaretha van Bancken owned the house known as "In de Blije Druck" where they printed publications for the city hall and the first Haarlem newspaper on the Grote Markt, Haarlem.

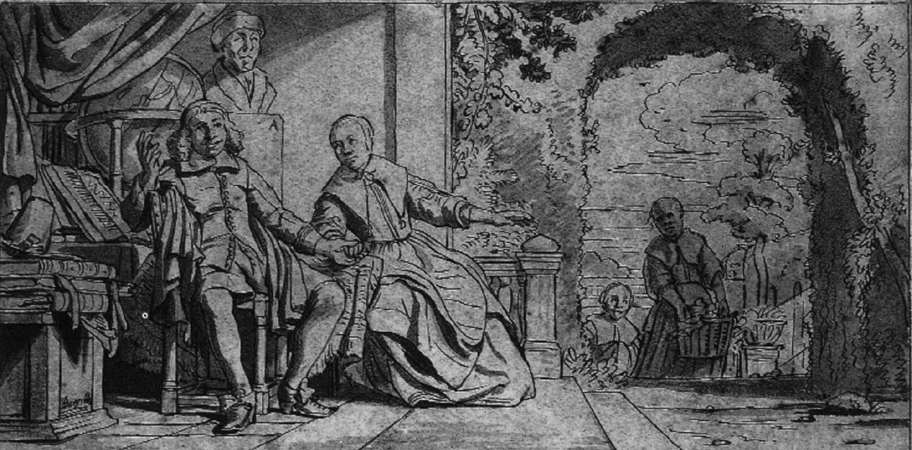
Drawing plan for this painting in the Fondation Custodia

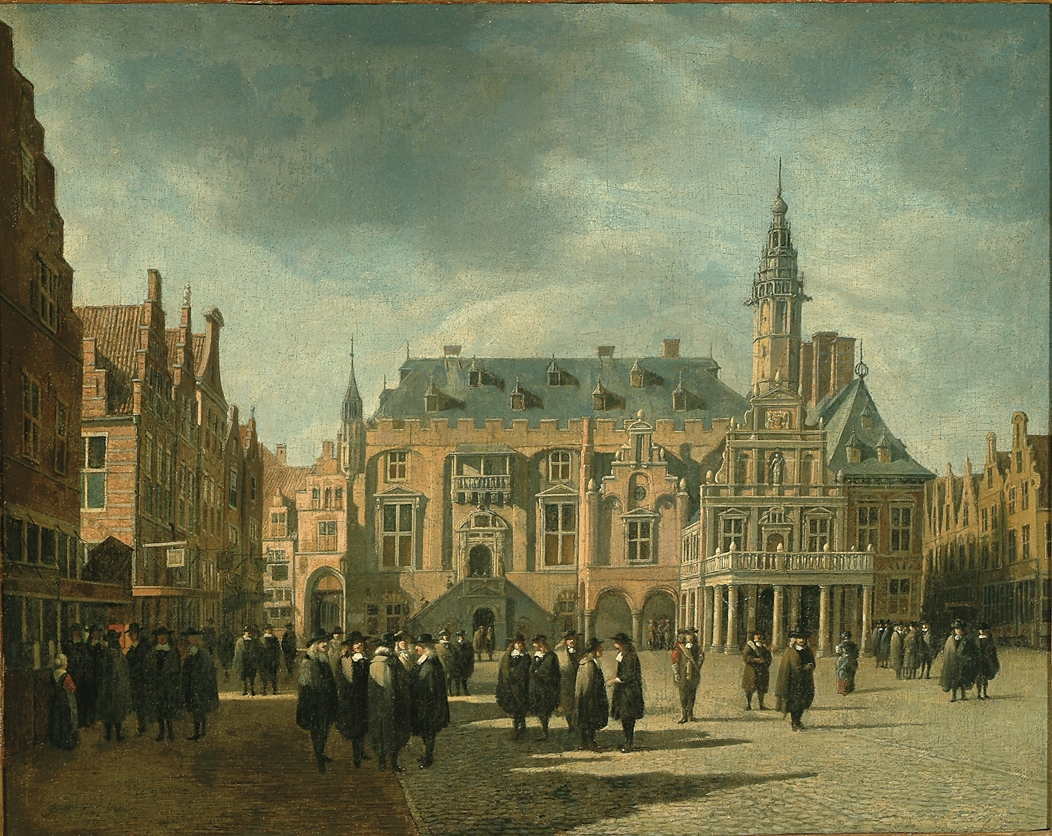
View of the Haarlem city hall and on the left is their house "In de Blije Druk" (closest house on the left with signboard), by Gerrit Adriaensz Berckheyde, 1671
