= Nina.care =

Dutch childcare and au pair company

- Type: Private
- Industry: Childcare
- Founders: Jasmijn Kok, Lyla Kok
- Headquarters: Netherlands
- Website: www.nina.care

Nina.care is a Dutch childcare company operating an online platform for babysitting and au pair services. The company was founded by twin sisters Jasmijn Kok and Lyla Kok. It operated as Nanny Nina before adopting the Nina.care name in 2023 as it expanded its services and international activities.

== History ==
=== Origins ===
Nina.care traces its origins to Oppas Madelief, a babysitting service established by Jasmijn and Lyla Kok. In 2017, De Ondernemer described the business as one of the larger babysitting networks in the Netherlands. The founders and the business were later profiled by Delta, the journalism platform of Delft University of Technology.

The sisters subsequently developed Nanny Nina, an online platform connecting families with childcare providers.

=== Investment and growth ===
The founders participated in the Dutch television programme Dragons' Den.

According to Haarlems Dagblad, the company raised more than €300,000 following its appearance on the programme.

In 2022, Nanny Nina was included in MT/Sprout's Challenger50, a selection of Dutch growth companies.

=== Rebranding ===
In 2023, the company rebranded from Nanny Nina to Nina.care. Contemporary reporting linked the rebrand to the launch of a new app, expansion into au pair services, and international growth ambitions.

== Services ==
Nina.care operates a platform that connects families with childcare providers. Its services include Babysitting matching and Au pair matching and placement

The company has expanded its activities beyond the Netherlands and has described international growth as part of its business strategy.

== Recognition ==
In 2022, Nanny Nina was included in MT/Sprout's Challenger50 ranking of Dutch growth companies.
