= Margaretha van Bancken =

Editor of the Haarlems Dagblad (1628–1694)

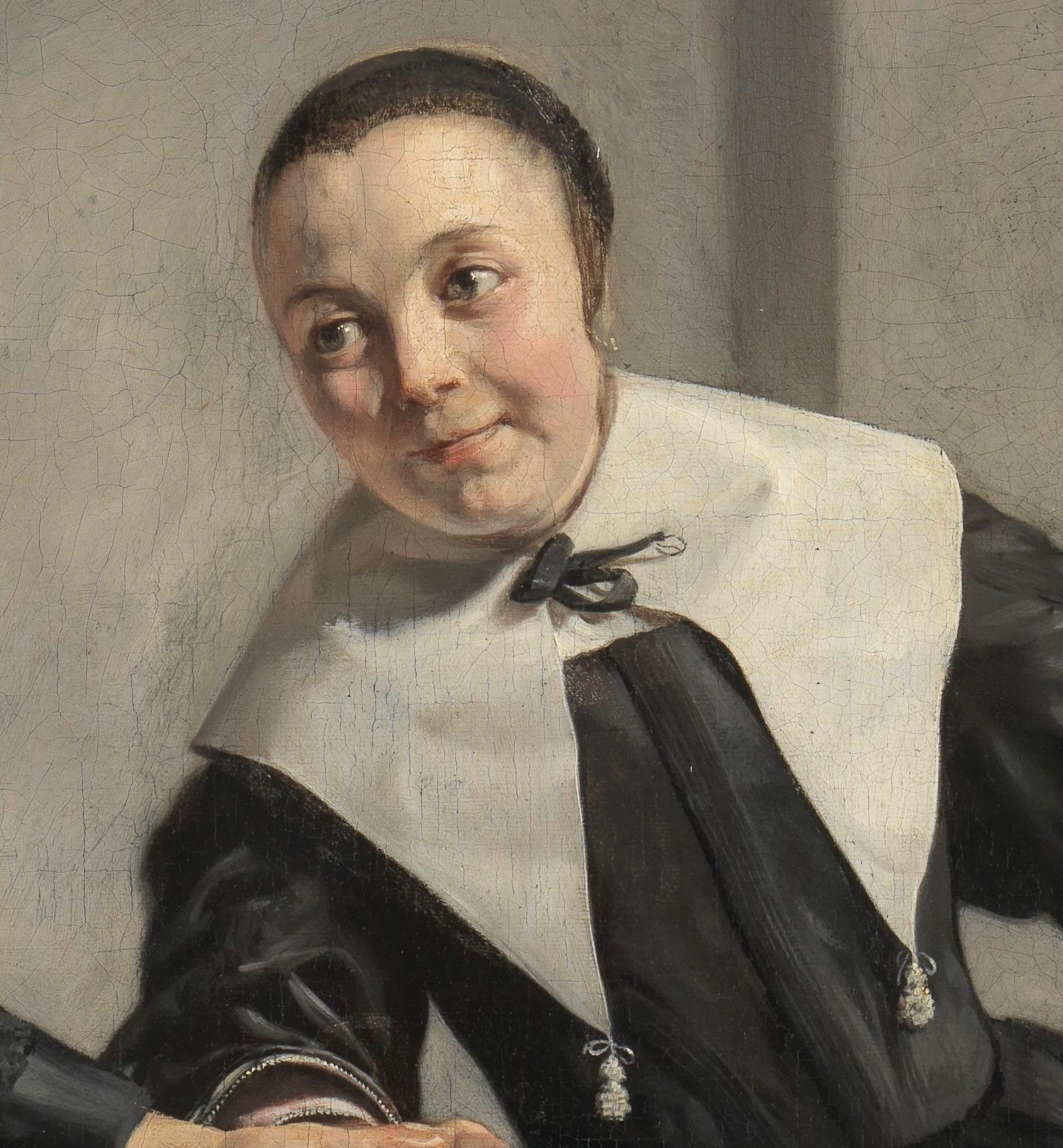
- Portrait of Margaretha van Bancken, detail of double portrait by Jan de Bray
- Born: 1628; Amsterdam
- Died: 1694 (aged 65–66); Haarlem

Margaretha van Bancken (Amsterdam 1628 - Haarlem 1694) was a Dutch publisher from Haarlem.

== Biography ==
She was the daughter of Dirck van Bancken and Anna Noppen. She married the city printer on 19 April 1661, Abraham Casteleyn. Their son, Gerard Casteleyn continued their work as publishers in the centrally located house "In de Blije Druck" on the main square Grote Markt, Haarlem. Most of their printing commissions came from the city hall across the square, but they also ran the newspaper called Opregte Haarlemsche Courant. The painter Jan de Bray painted their double portrait sitting with clasped hands under a bust of Laurens Janszoon Coster, the Haarlem inventor of the printing press.

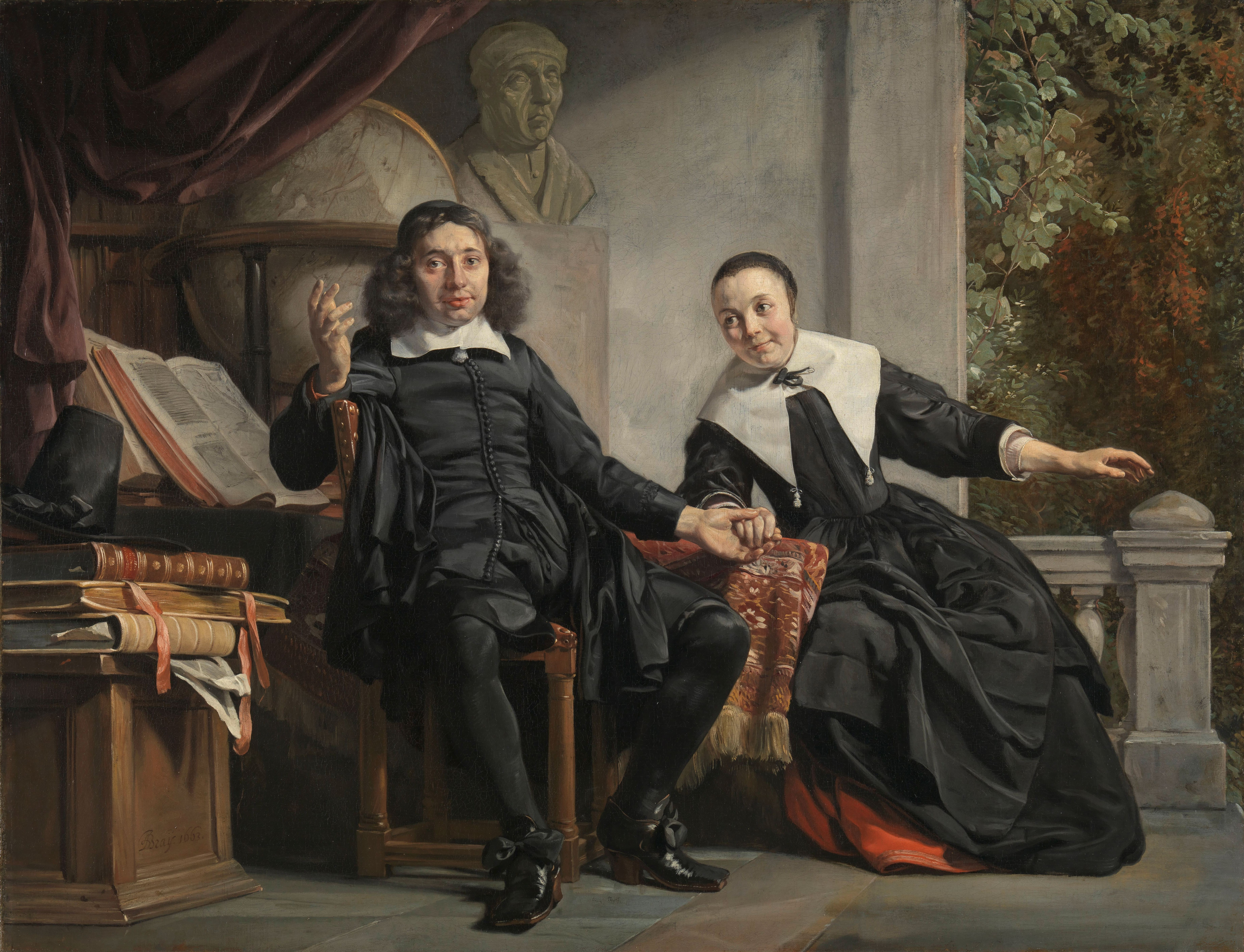
Portrait of Abraham Casteleyn and his Wife, Margaretha van Bancken, by Jan de Bray, 1663

After her husband died she married Frederik van Vliet on 15 Sept. 1682 but continued to print works under her own name.

== Works ==
- Haarlem pharmacopoea, Gedrukt tot Haerlem bij Margareta van Bancken Stads-Drukster, op de Markt 1692
- Ordonnantie van de Bank van Leeninge, Binnen de Stadt Haerlem, Gedruckt by Margareta van Bancken, Stadsdruckster, op de Markt, Anno 1682
- Renovatie en Amplicatie op de Keure ende Ordonnantie van de Zijde-Floers. Gedruckt tot Haerlem, by Margareta van Bancken, Stads-Druckster, 1684

== See also ==
- List of women printers and publishers before 1800
