= Peeckelhaeringh =

Painting by Frans Hals

- Der lustige Zecher / Herr Peeckelhaering (German)
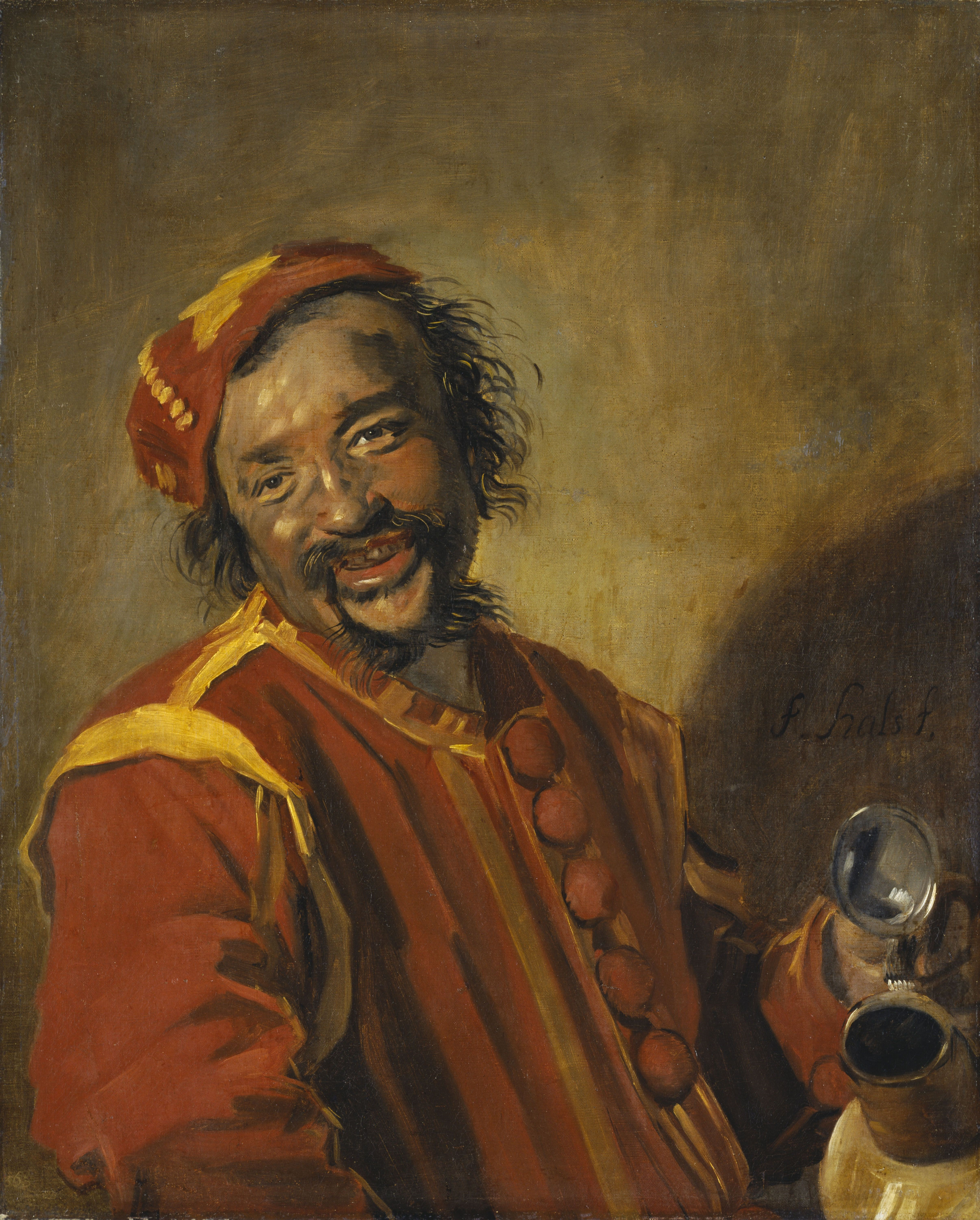
- Artist: Frans Hals
- Year: 1628–1630
- Type: Tronie
- Medium: Oil on canvas
- Dimensions: 75 cm x 61.5 cm
- Location: Schloss Wilhelmshöhe; Kassel, Germany
- Accession: 216

Peeckelhaeringh, or Pekelharing, refers to an old Dutch word for pickled herring. Today it is best known as the name of a comic theatrical character who was the subject of a painting by Frans Hals.

A stock character in 17th-century comic plays, Mr. Peeckelhaering was a gluttonous buffoon whose diet of herring gave him an insatiable thirst. Hals's painting of the character is an oil on canvas and dates from ca. 1628–1630. The painting was documented by Cornelis Hofstede de Groot in 1910, who wrote:

95. THE MERRY TOPER. B. 97; M. 267. Half-length, life size. A laughing man with a brown face is turned half right. His head is slightly inclined to the left; he looks at the spectator. He has a slight beard and moustache. His rough hair sticks out from beneath a flat red cap with yellow trimming. His costume is also red and yellow. In his left hand he holds a mug with open lid. In the same style as 96 and 98. This picture is represented in two pictures by Jan Steen, Nos. 137 and 446 (see Vol. I.). [Pendant to 123. Compare 99a.] Signed on the right above the mug " f. hals f."; canvas, 29 1/2 inches by 24 inches. Engraved by J. Suyderhoef as "Monsieur Peeckelhaering." Under the name "Peeckelhaering" pictures are mentioned in the inventories of Henric Bugge, Leyden, 1666; Hendrick Huyck, Nymwegen, January 10, 1669; and Jan Zeeuw and Marie Bergervis, who died 1690, Amsterdam according to notes by A. Bredius. A copy on canvas, 29 1/2 inches by 26 inches, signed on the right with the monogram was in the sale: Vicomte de Buisseret, Brussels, April 29, 1891, No. 41. In the chief Kassel inventory of 1749, No. 363. In the Kassel Gallery, 1903 catalogue, No. 216.

A reproductive print of Hals's painting made by the local engraver Jonas Suyderhoef was published with a poem declaring that "Mr. Peeckelhaering's wet lips show how he enjoys a fresh mug of beer because his throat is always dry."

== Pendants ==
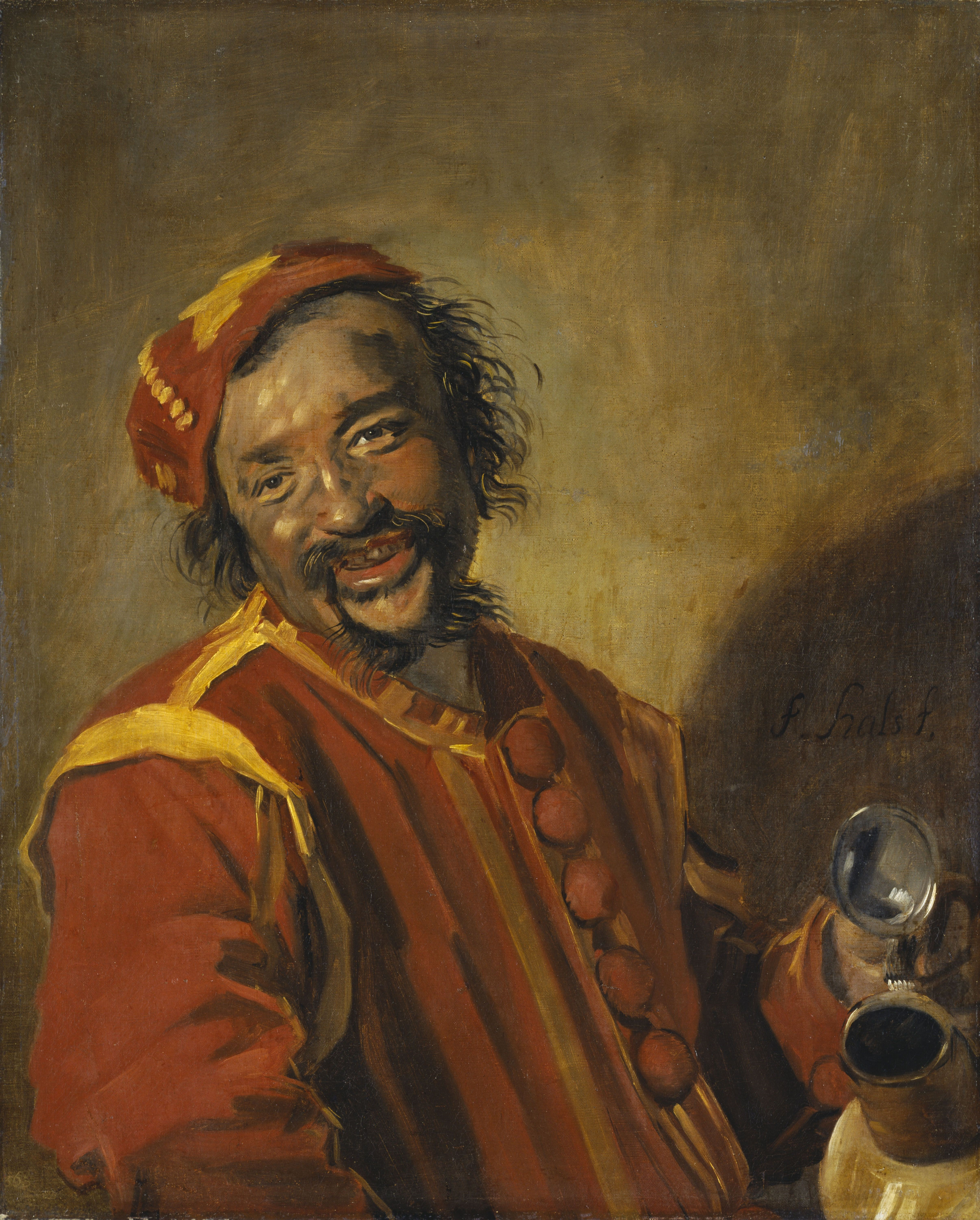
Hofstede de Groot #95

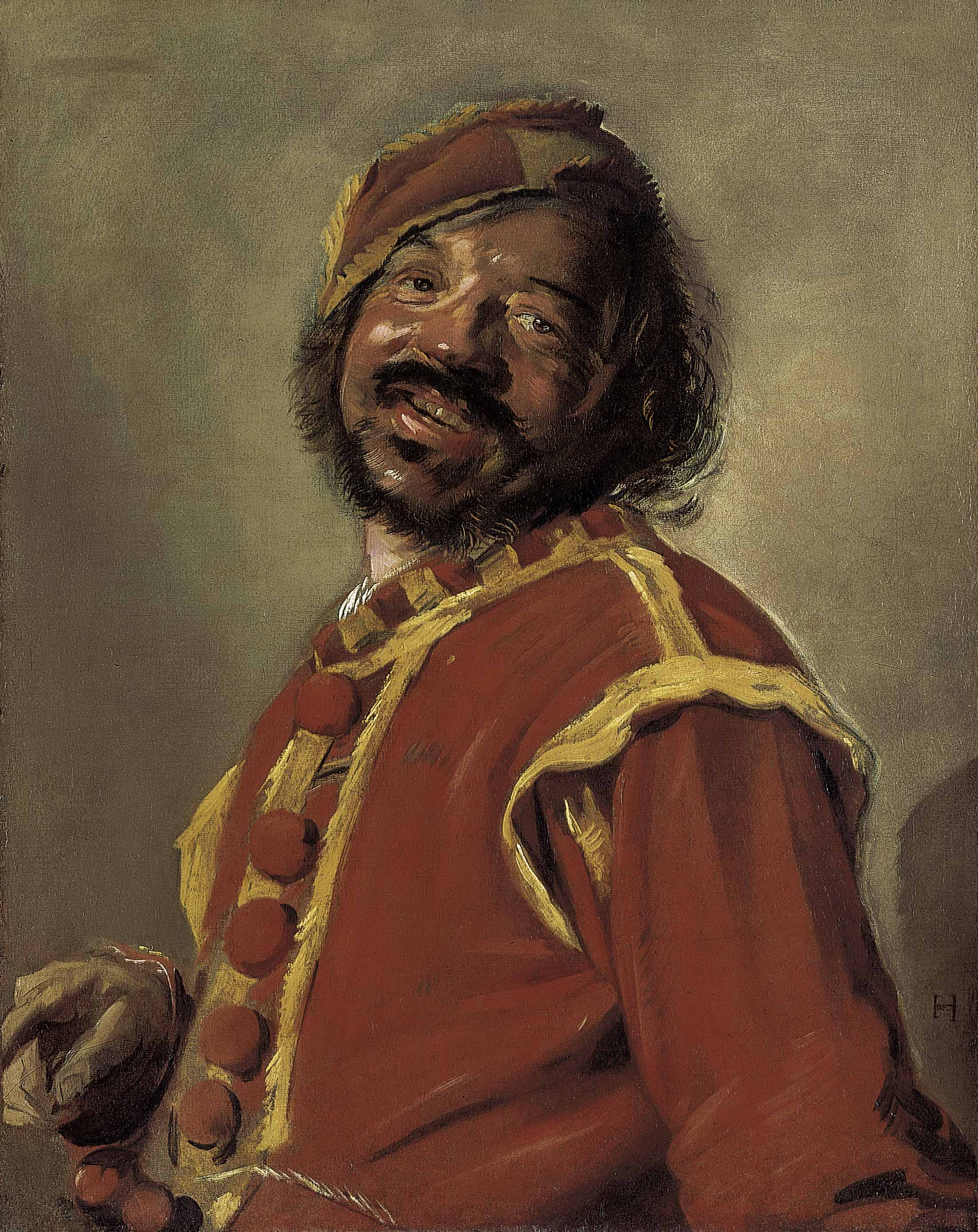
Hofstede de Groot #96, called "The Mulatto"

This painting was owned by the Leiden painter Jan Steen who painted it on the background walls of a few of his household scenes, namely The Doctor's Visit, and The Christening.

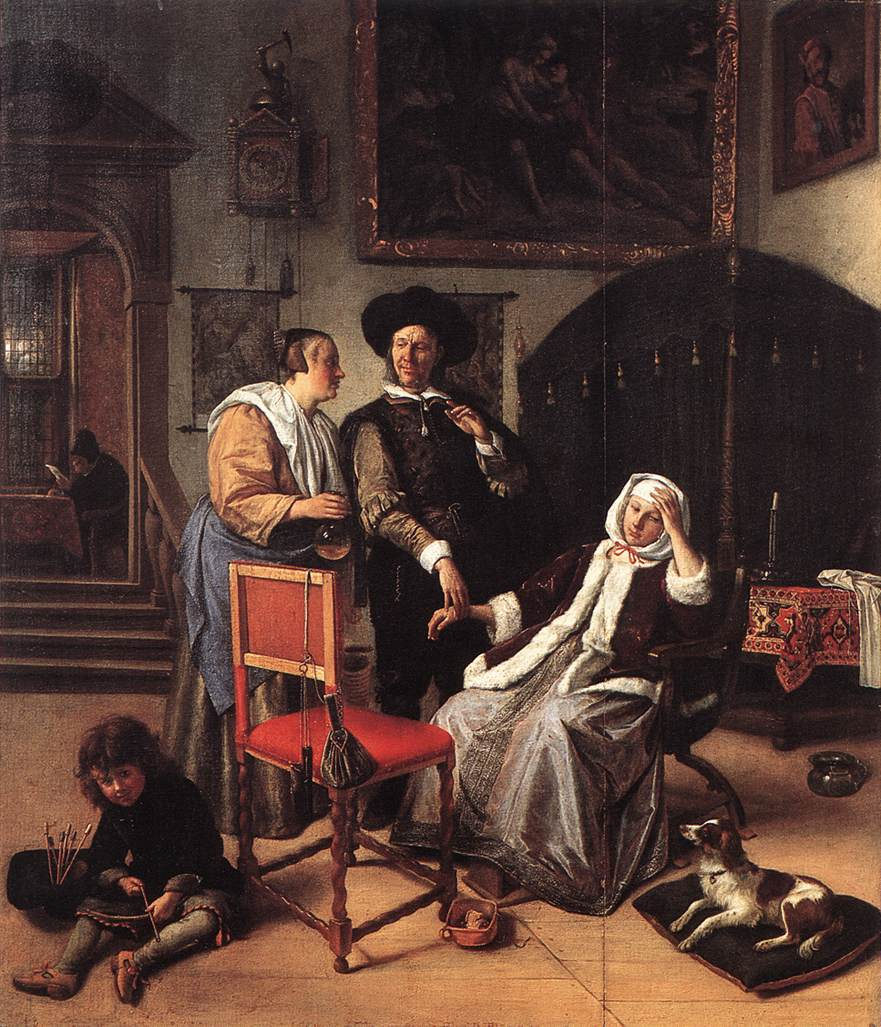
Steen painting The Doctor's Visit

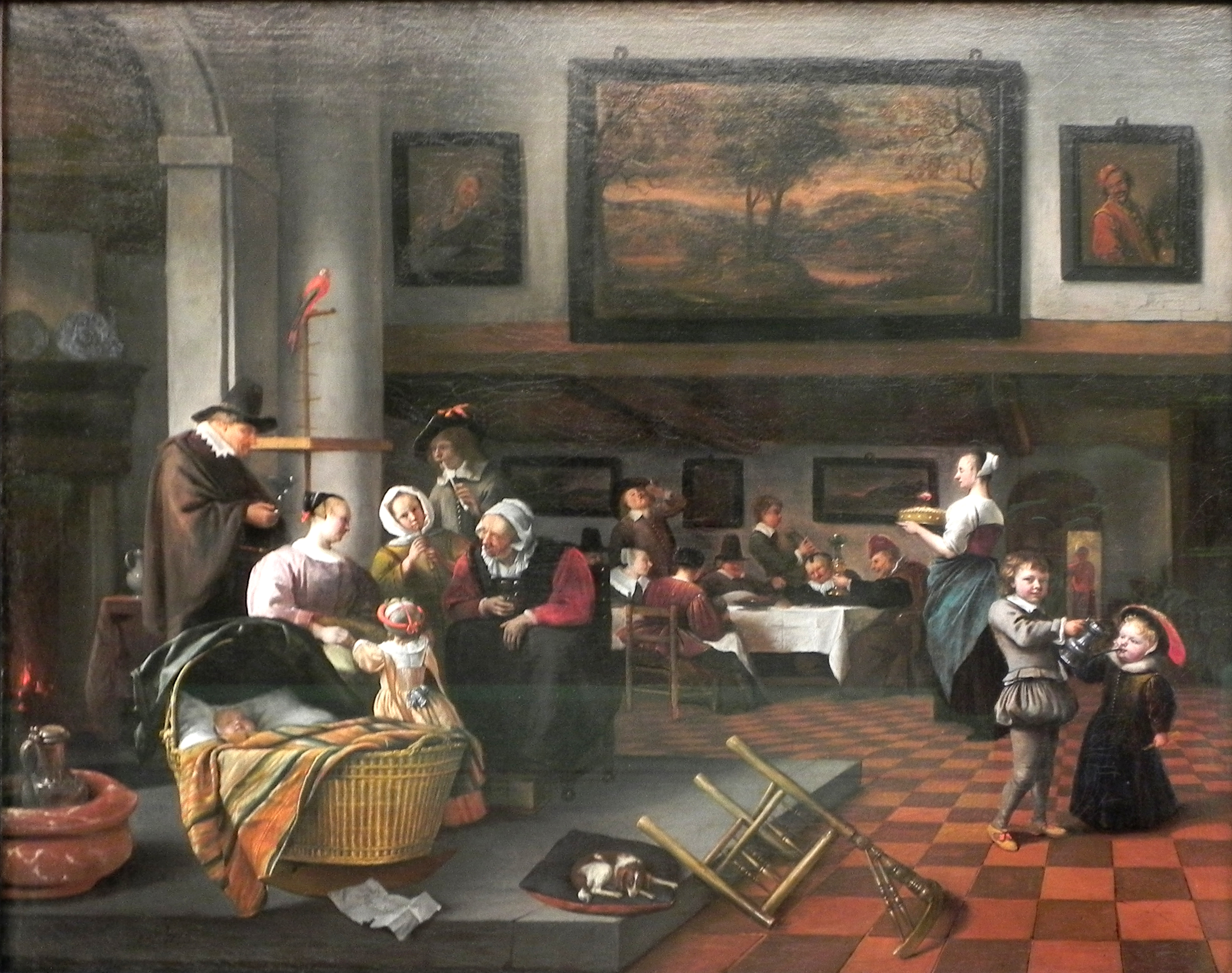
Steen painting The Christening

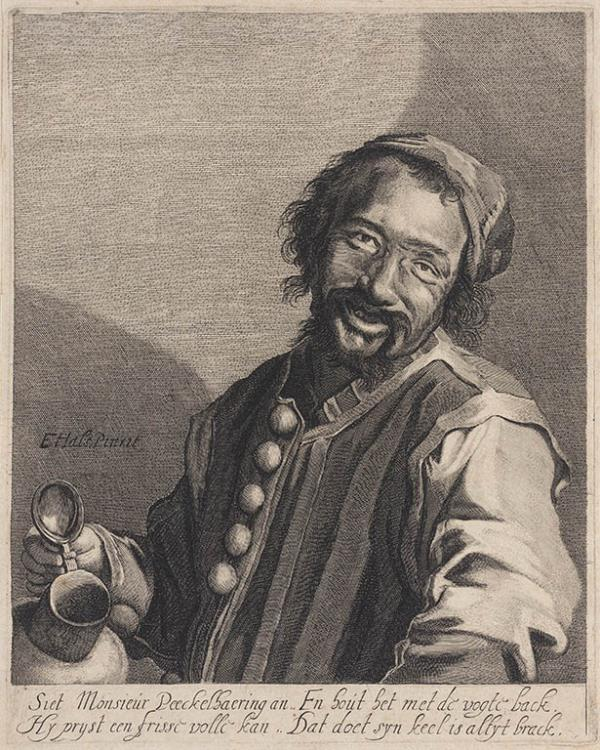
Engraving by Suyderhoef of Peeckelhaering, with rhyme

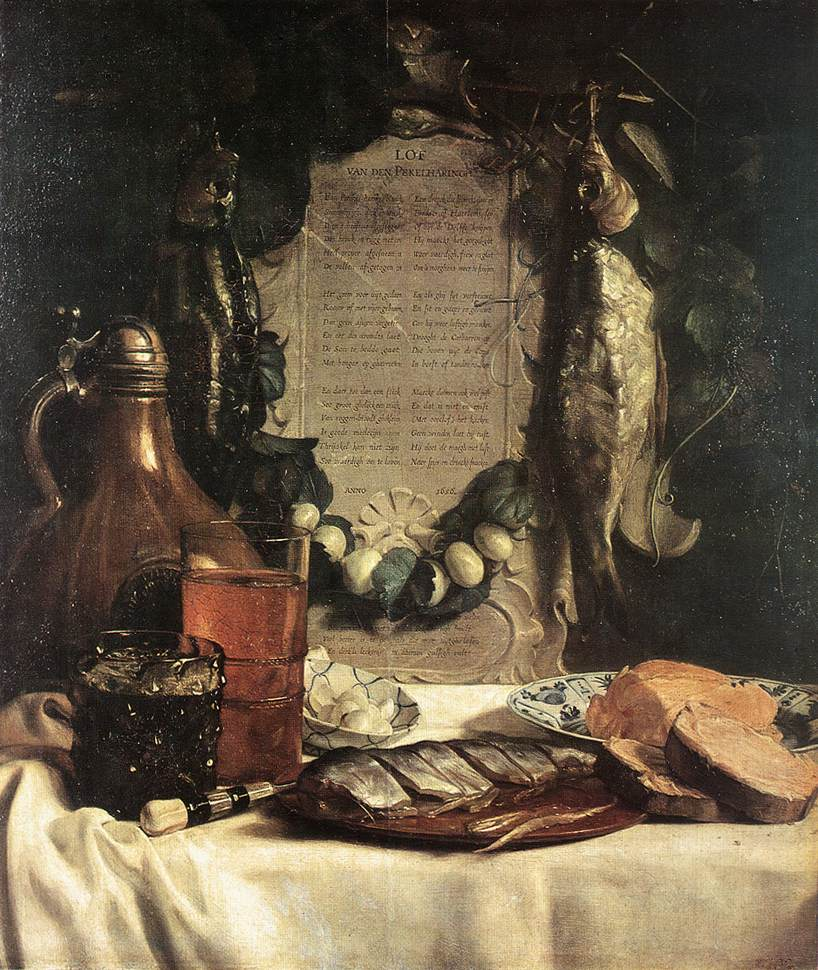
Pickled herring in a still life accompanied by a poem called "Lof aan de Pekelharing", by Joseph de Bray

== See also ==
- List of paintings by Frans Hals
