= Zijlpoort =

Zijlpoort may refer to:

- Zijlpoort (Leiden)
- Zijlpoort (Haarlem)
