= Haarlems Dagblad =

Dutch newspaper

- Type: Regional daily newspaper
- Format: Tabloid
- Owner: Mediahuis
- Publisher: HDC Media
- Founded: 1656; 370 years ago; 1883; 143 years ago (current title)
- Language: Dutch
- Headquarters: Haarlem
- Website: haarlemsdagblad.nl

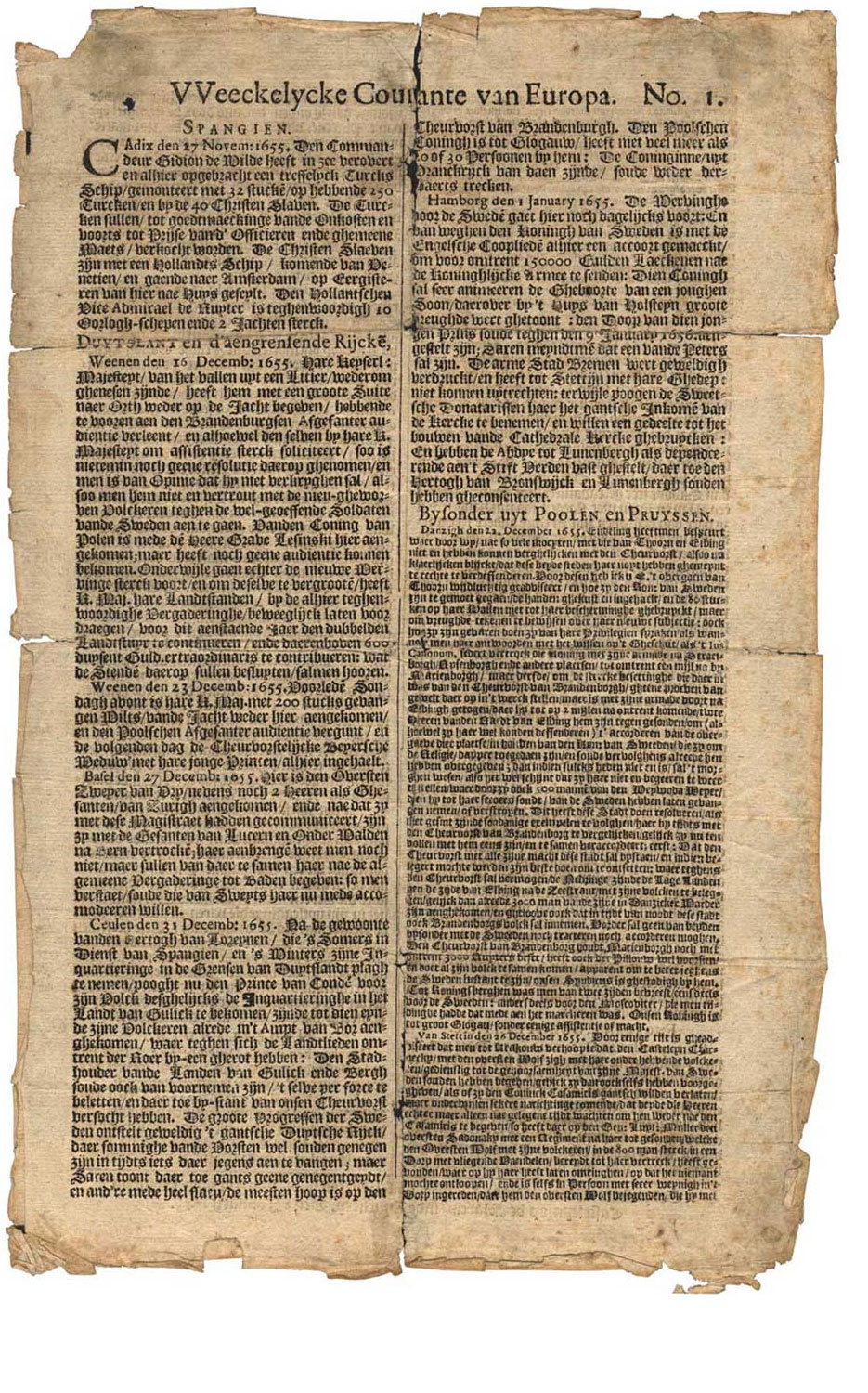
Front page of Abraham Casteleyn's Weeckelycke Courante van Europa

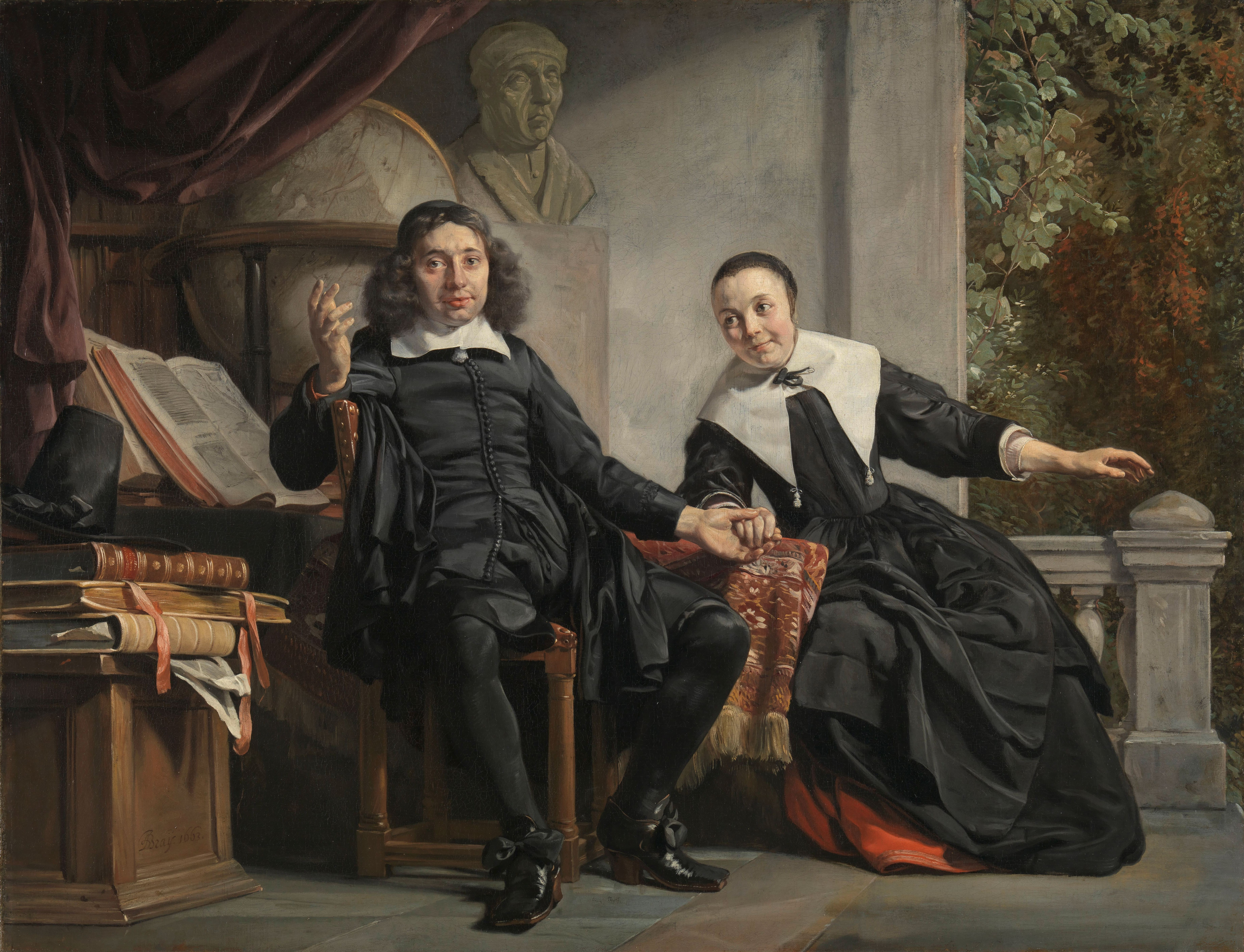
Portrait of Abraham Casteleyn and his Wife, Margaretha van Bancken, by Jan de Bray, 1663

The Haarlems Dagblad is a regional newspaper in Haarlem, Netherlands. It claims to be the oldest newspaper in the world still in printed circulation, although it was forced to merge with another Haarlem-based newspaper during the German occupation of the Netherlands.

== Oprechte Haerlemsche Courant ==
This earlier publication was published by Abraham Casteleyn and his wife Margaretha van Bancken, beginning in 1656 under the title Weeckelycke Courante van Europa ("Weekly Newspaper of Europe"). In 1664, when the authorities took steps to protect the weekly from its imitators, it became known as De Oprechte Haerlemse Courant (spellings vary; "oprecht" is here used in its archaic sense of "genuine"). After her husband's death in 1681, Margaretha received permission to carry on the activities of the firm.

The weekly (which soon began appearing twice and subsequently three times a week, and in the nineteenth century became a monthly) thus preceded English regular newspapers. In the paper's early days, the Windsor coffee house used to advertise that, apart from offering "the best chocolate", it supplied translations of "the Harlem Courant soon after the post is come in".

During the German occupation of the Netherlands in the Second World War, the Opregte Haarlemsche Courant was forced to merge with Haarlems Dagblad; hence the latter paper's claim to being the oldest title extant. The merged newspaper is owned by Mediahuis, a Belgian newspaper conglomerate.
