= Salomon de Bray =

Dutch painter and architect (1597–1664)

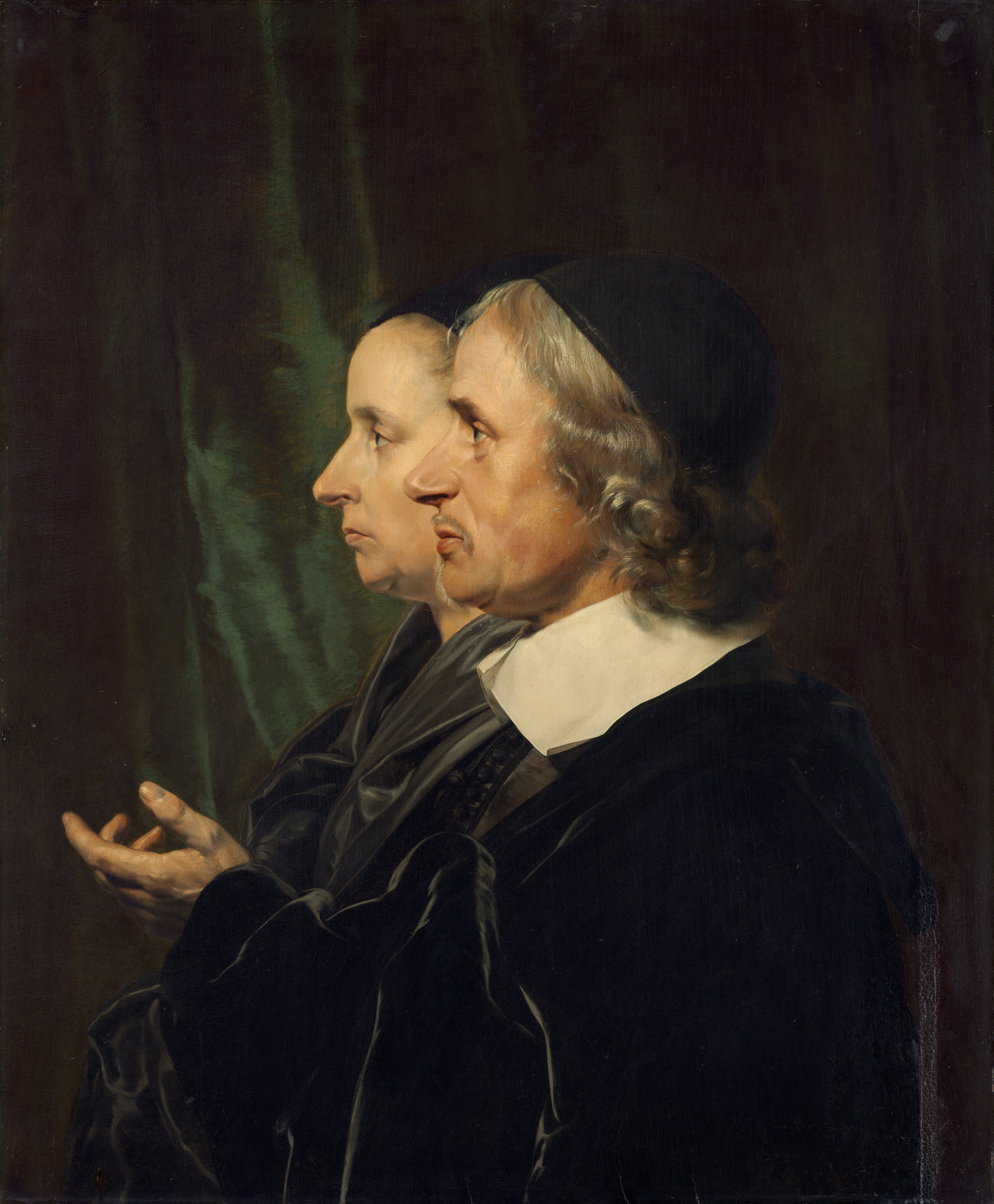
Salomon de Bray and his wife, by their son Jan de Bray, National Gallery of Art, Washington, D.C.

Salomon de Bray (1597 – 11 May 1664) was a Dutch Golden Age painter and architect.

== Biography ==
De Bray was born in Amsterdam, but established himself in Haarlem before 1617, where he is registered as being a member of the schutterij that year in the St. Adrian's cloveniers. He probably followed draftsmanship and painting lessons in the small academy started by Karel van Mander, Hendrick Goltzius and Cornelis van Haarlem, and where he married in 1625. He is registered as a pupil of Goltzius and Cornelis van Haarlem, but he probably started his training in Amsterdam with Jan Pynas, Nicolaes Moeyaert and Pieter Lastman. He painted history paintings, portraits and landscapes. As a Catholic he probably also made altar pieces for the Haarlem underground Catholic churches known as mission stations, or staties. He was a poet and member of the Chamber of rhetoric called "De Wijngaertranken". One of his poems was set to music by his friend the composer Cornelis Padbrué. This is probably how he met his wife Anna, the sister of the painter Jan and the poet Jacob Westerbaen, who were also members of De Wijngaertrancken. They married in 1625.

== Failed charter of the Guild of St. Luke ==
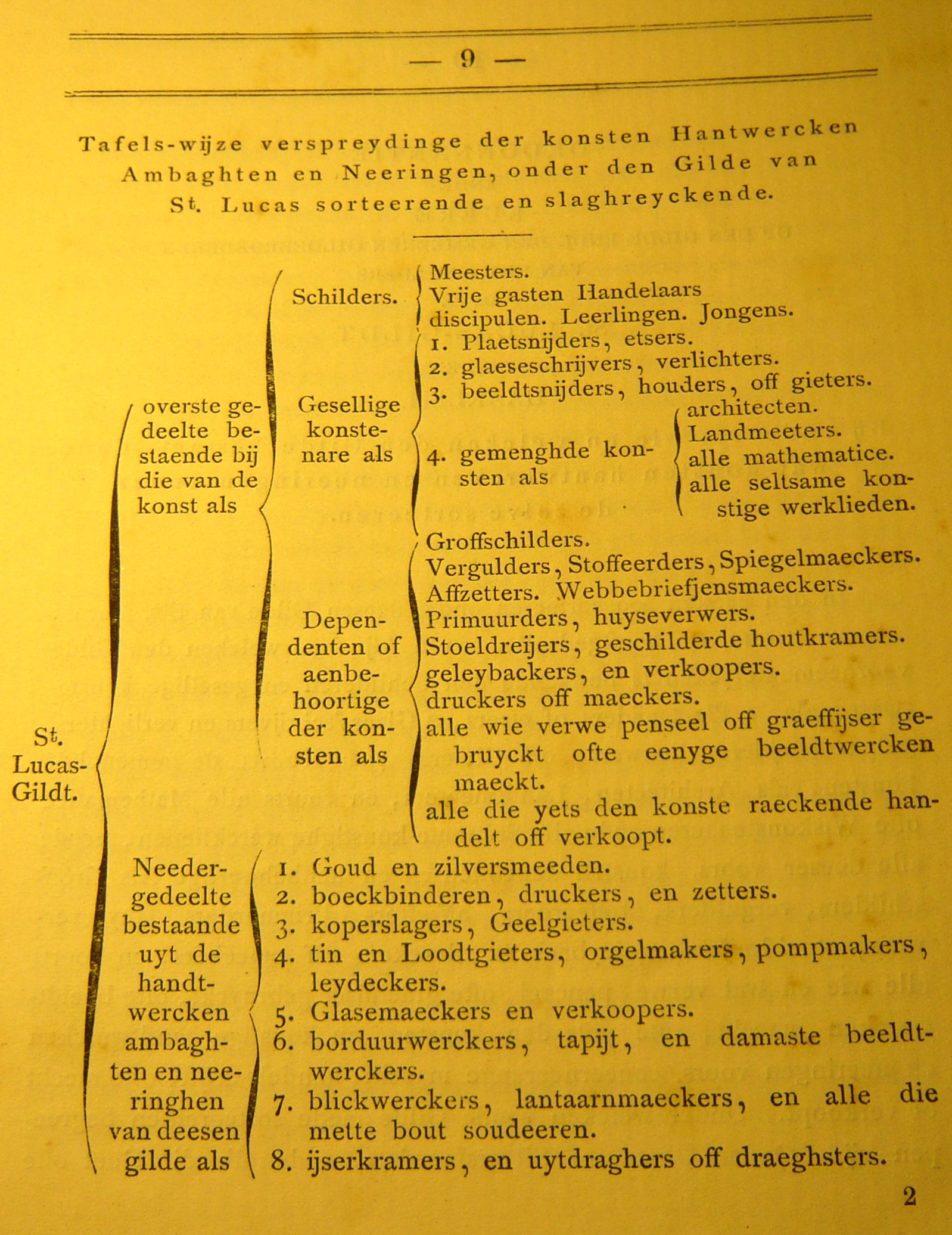
Transcription of Salomon de Bray's proposed hierarchy of the guild in 1631, by the Haarlem archivist C.J. Gonnet, 1877

In 1630 he became a member of the Haarlem Guild of St. Luke. He cooperated with fellow guild member and Catholic architect-artist Jacob van Campen in the decoration of Huis ten Bosch in The Hague. His works draw on the spirit of the Dutch classicism beginning at that time, and are comparable with those of his Catholic colleague Pieter de Grebber. De Bray became active as an architect and designer of silverwork, and became headman of the Guild of St. Luke. He prepared a new charter for the guild (that was never ratified) in 1631, that was signed by Pieter de Molijn, Outgert Ariss Akersloot, Willem Claesz Heda, Cornelis Cornelisz, Cornelis Claesz van Wieringen, Floris van Dyck, and Isaak Halinck, respected members of the guild. This charter met with a lot of opposition from the Haarlem council, and was probably rejected for its efforts to promote painting above other guild pursuits such as engraving, woodcarving, tapestry-making, smithwork and pottery. In 1632 he made efforts to retrieve the St. Lucas guild relic that had been stored in the guild altar of the St. Bavochurch. It had been given to a representative of the Catholic church for safekeeping and De Bray felt it should be brought back to Haarlem, but the relic was never found.

== Work as an architect ==
As an architect, he was involved in the construction or expansion of Haarlem's City Hall in 1630, the new consistory of the Bavokerk, the Zijlpoort, and St. Annakerk (Church of St. Anne). Outside of Haarlem, he designed a new entrance in 1629 for the Huis te Warmond (since rebuilt) that featured pilasters and a broad pediment. In Nijmegen he made a design for the city orphanage. He was also a town planner for the city council of Haarlem. He designed an ambitious plan to expand the city on the North side with three canals (the "Brouwers gracht", the "Staten gracht", and the "Linde gracht") that was partially implemented in the decades after his death with the Nieuwe Gracht and what is today the Parklaan. In 1631 Salomon de Bray wrote "Architectura Moderna" which provided a biography and descriptions of buildings built by Hendrick de Keyser and Cornelis Danckerts de Ry, two of the key Dutch architects of the period.

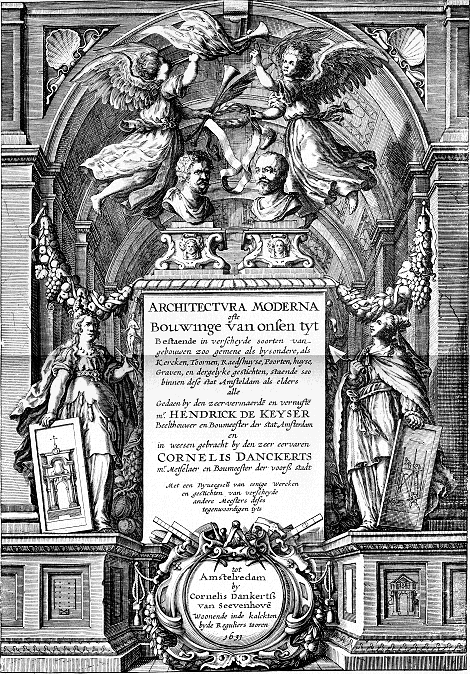
Titlepage Architectura Moderna, 1631

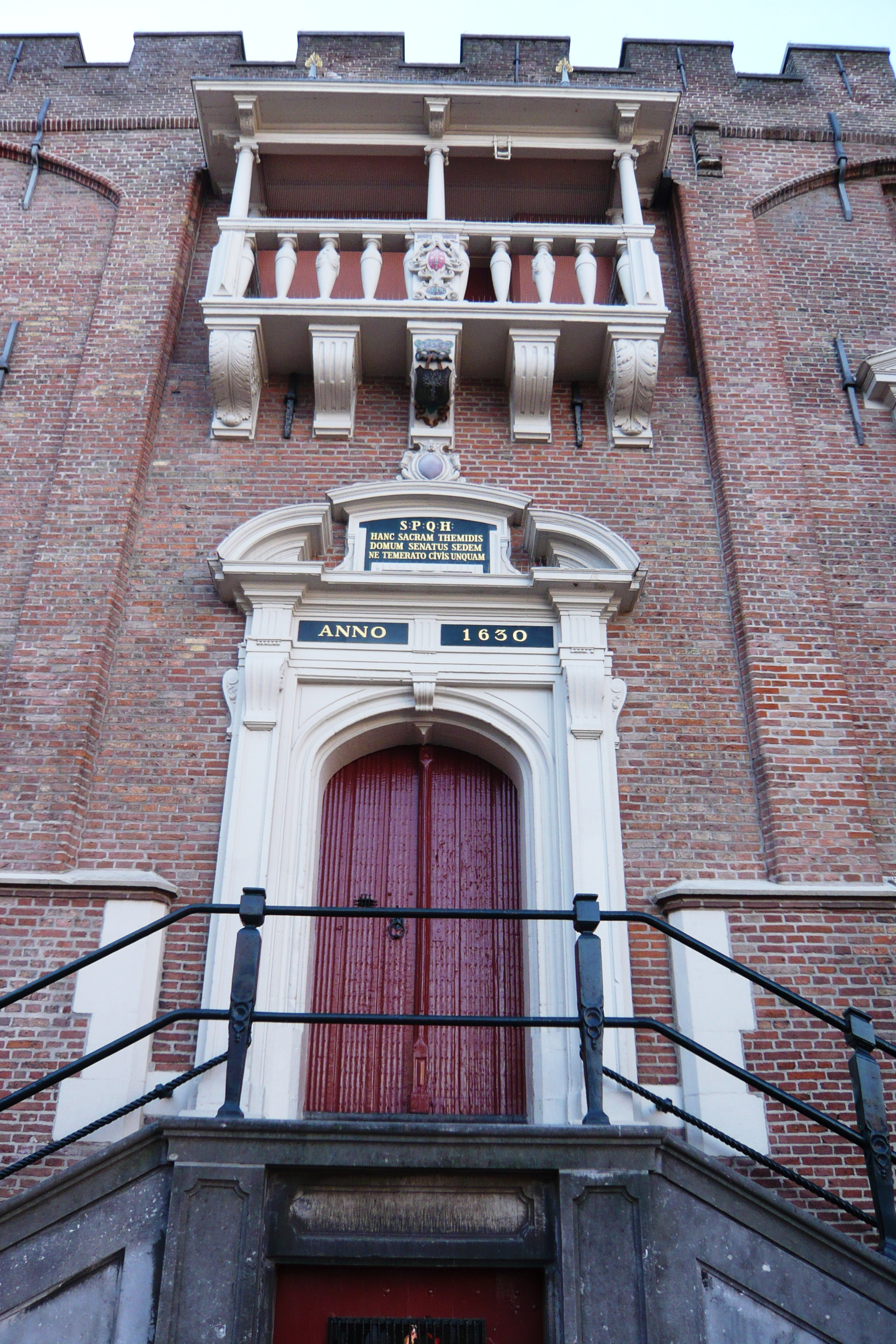
Door and balcony of the Haarlem City Hall, designed by Salomon de Bray in 1630

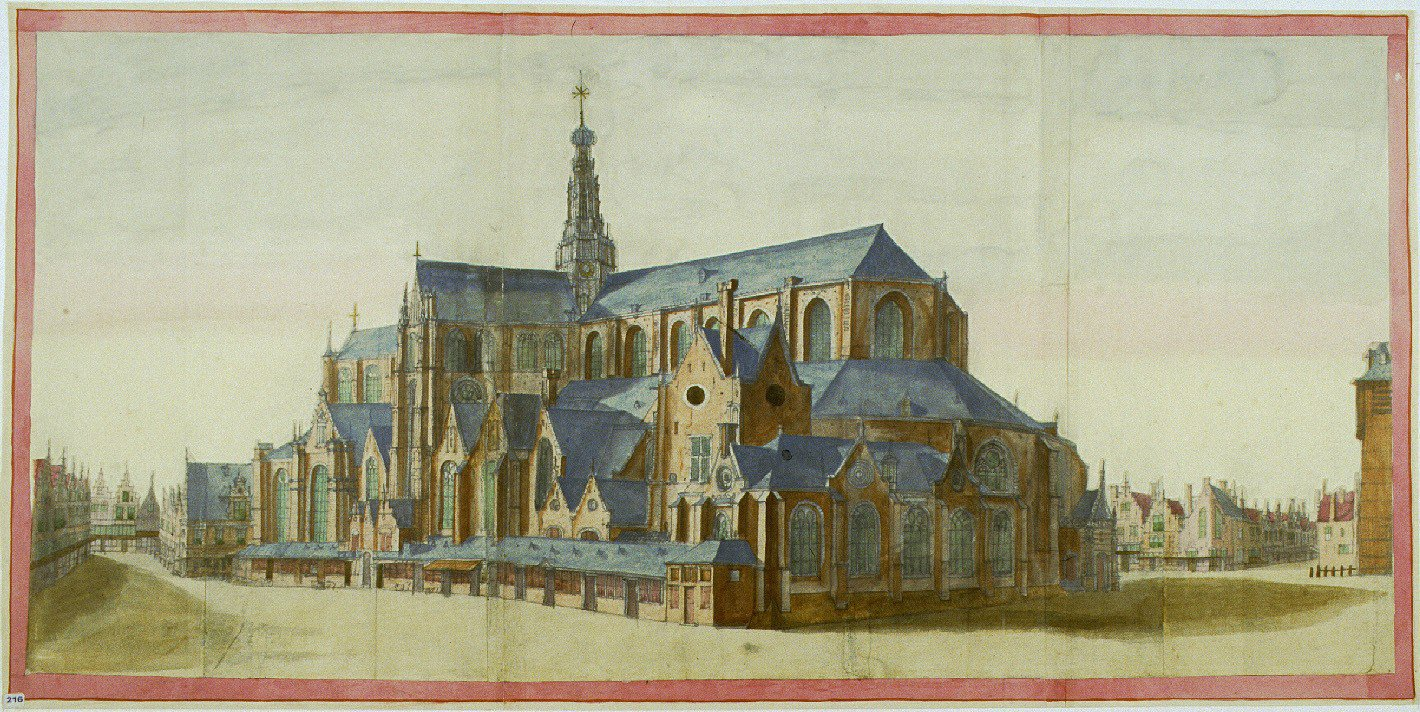
Jan Abrahamsz Beerstraaten's view of the St. Bavochurch in 1659 soon after the new consistory (in the foreground) was completed by Salomon de Bray

== Family of painters ==
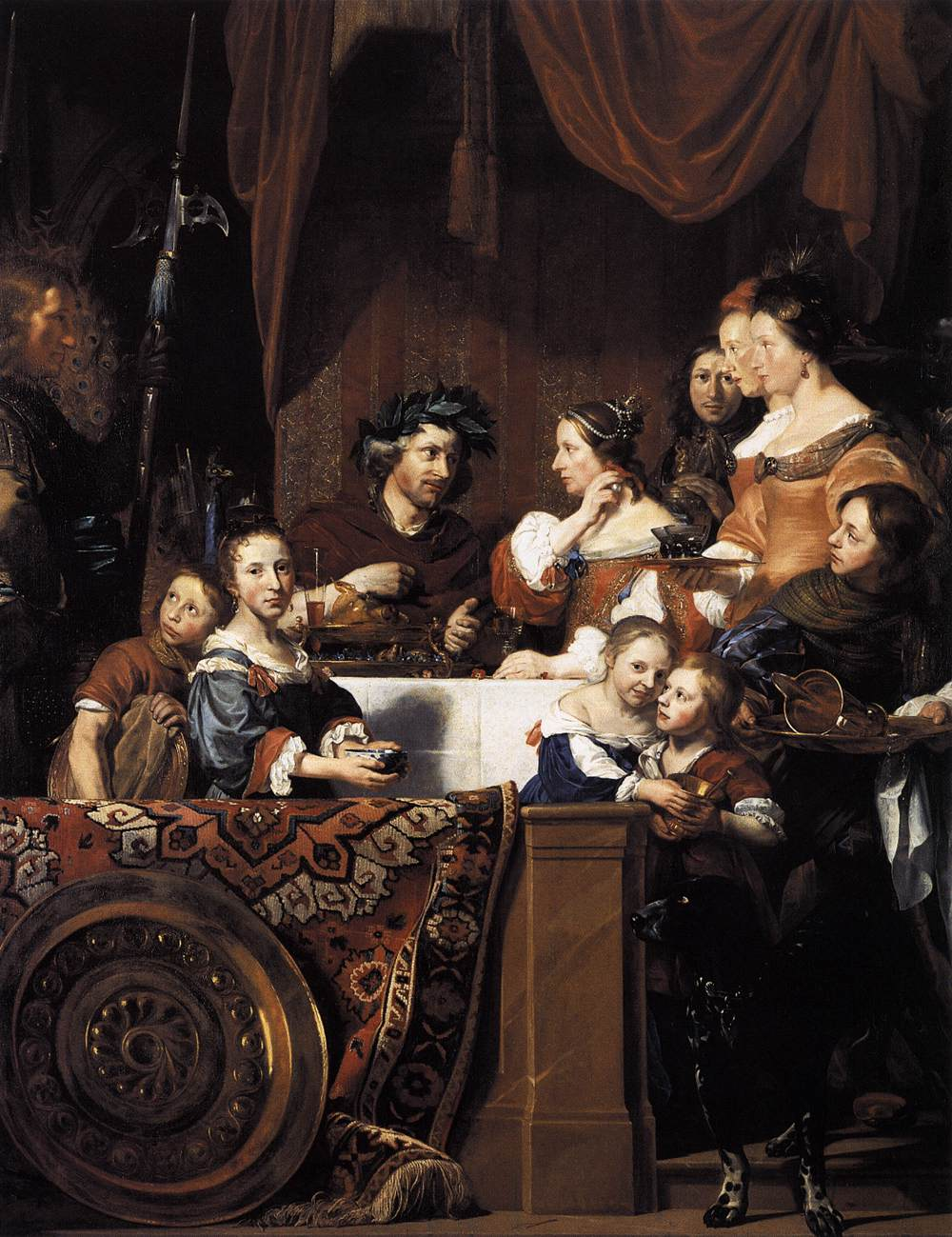
Cleopatra puts a pearl earring in the wine, posthumous family portrait poignantly illustrating a "priceless meal" with Salomon as Anthony and his wife Anna as Cleopatra, painted by son Jan (on the far left looking over at his sister and wife), and son Dirck (gazing out towards the viewer on the right) as the only surviving family members. 1669, Currier Museum of Art.

Salomon de Bray was the father of ten children, of whom three (Dirck de Bray, Jan de Bray, and Joseph de Bray) became notable artists. He probably died of the plague that hit Haarlem in 1664, as he and his children Jacob, Josef, Juliana and Margaretha all died in April and May of that year. His wife had already died the previous year. He was buried in the Sint-Bavokerk in Haarlem.

== Gallery ==
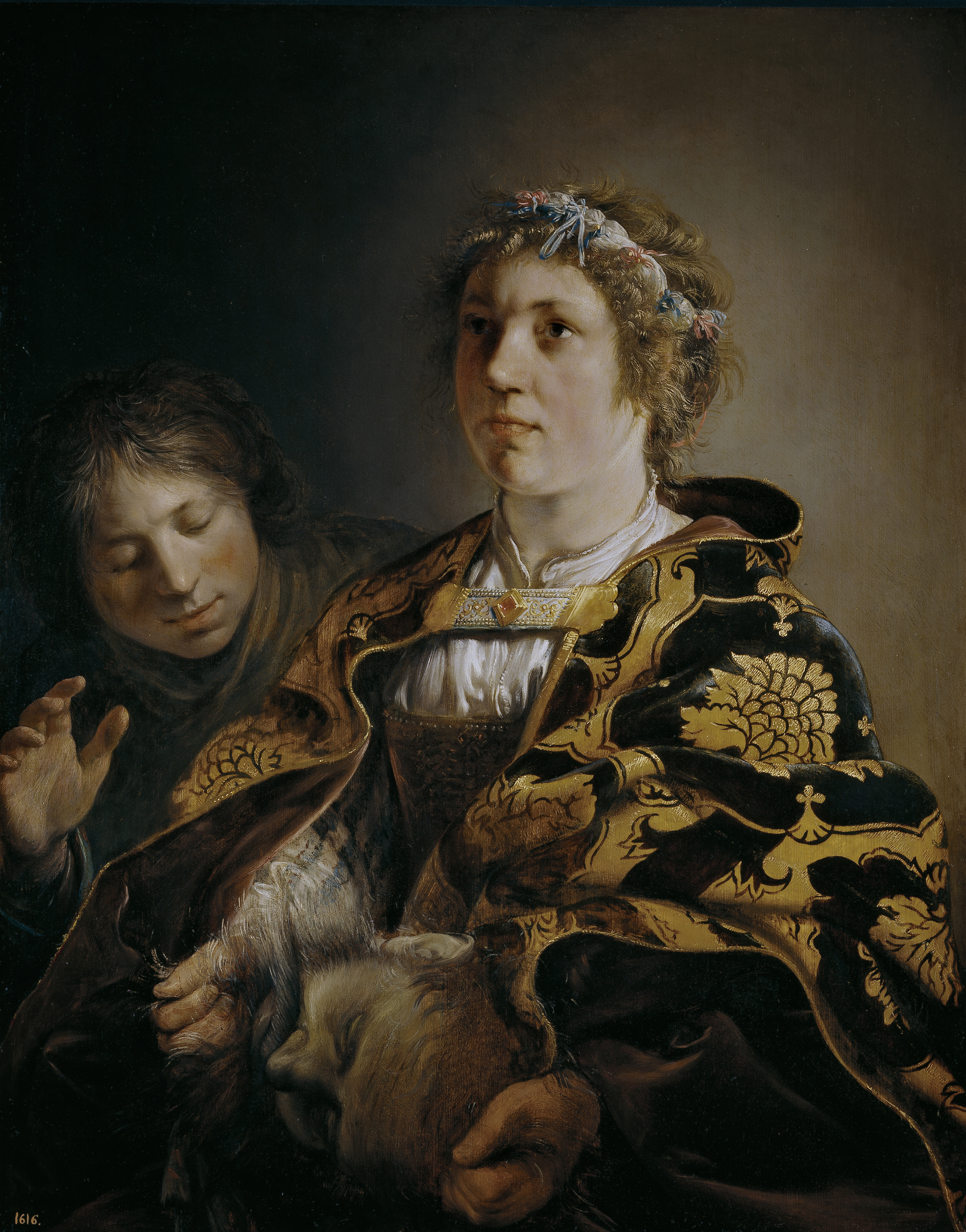
Judith with the head of Holofernes

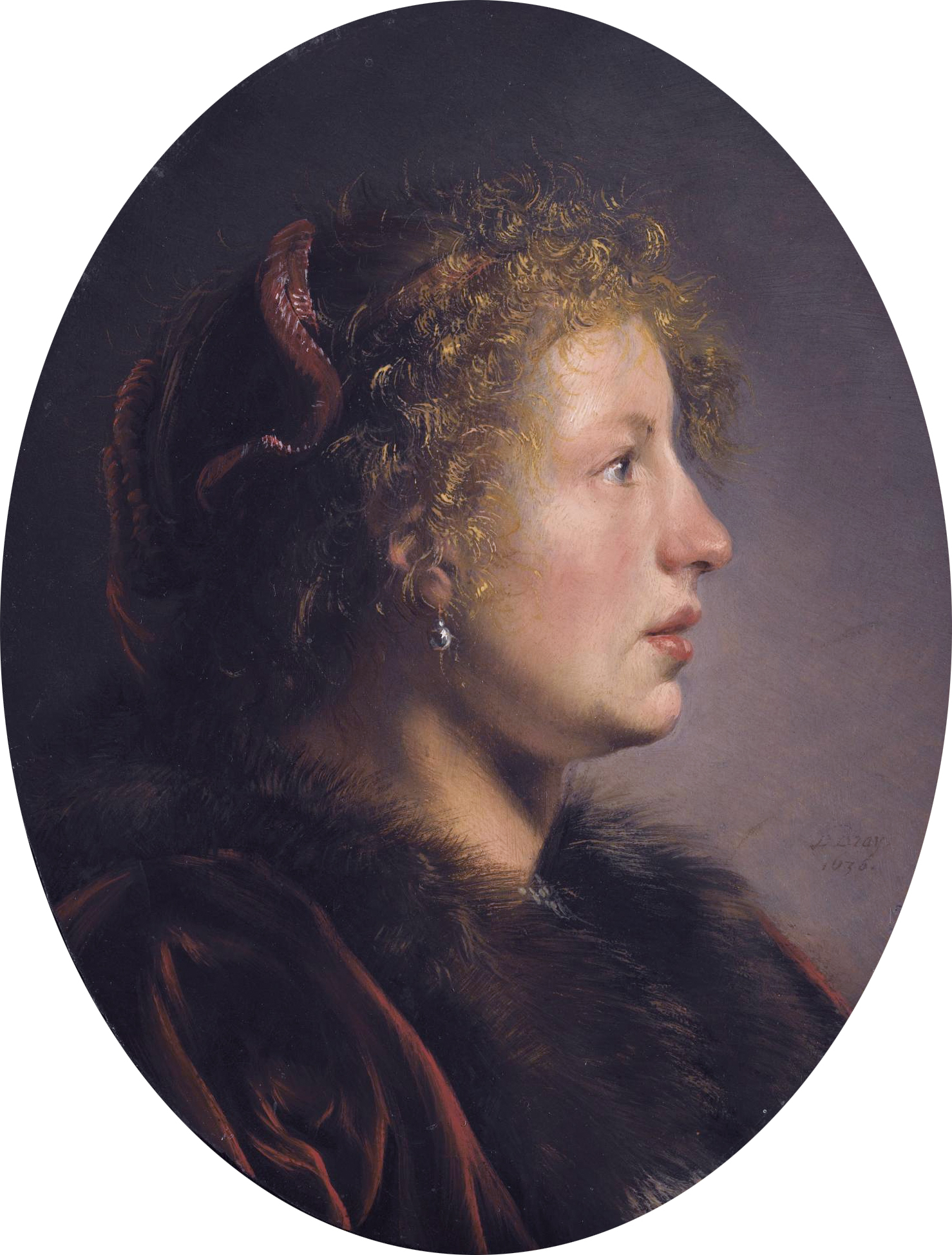
Study of a young woman in profile (Salomon de Bray, 1636)

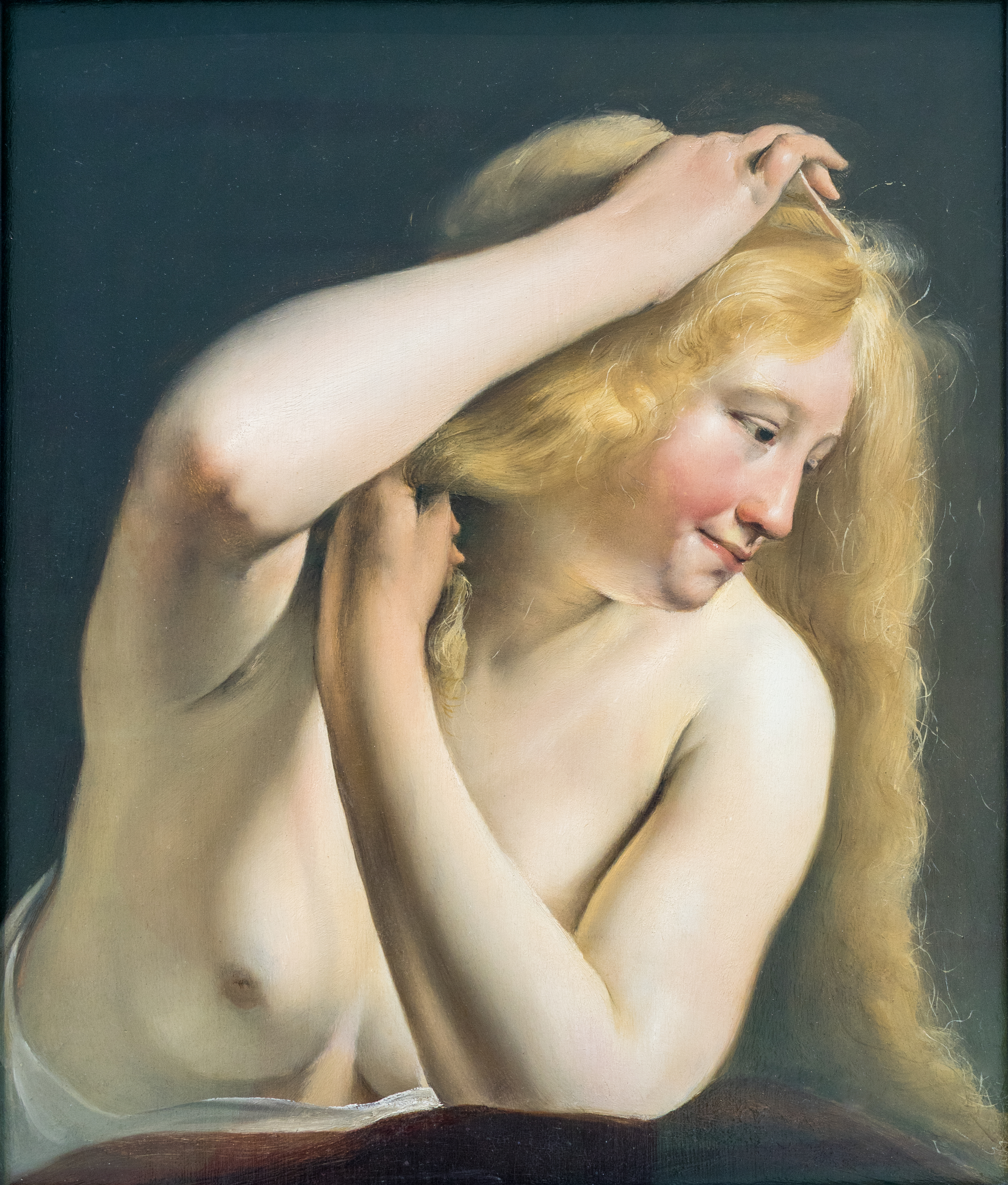
Young woman
