= Joseph de Bray =

Dutch painter (1630–1664)

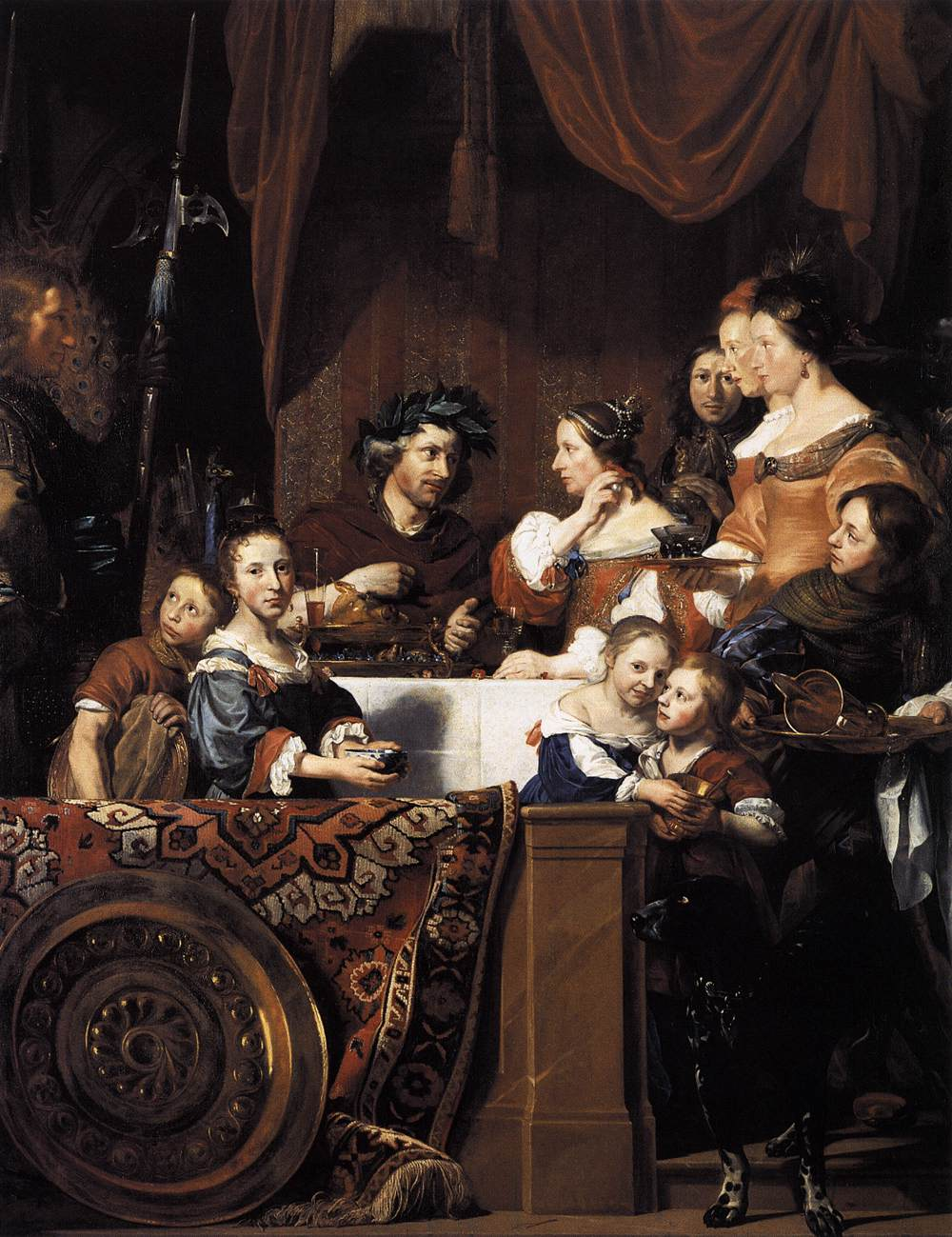
In his brother Jan de Bray's family portrait depicting the banquet of Antony and Cleopatra at the moment when Cleopatra puts her earring in the wine, Joseph is depicted on the right holding an empty tray and carafe.

Joseph de Bray (1630, Haarlem – 1664, Haarlem), was a Dutch Golden Age painter.

== Biography ==
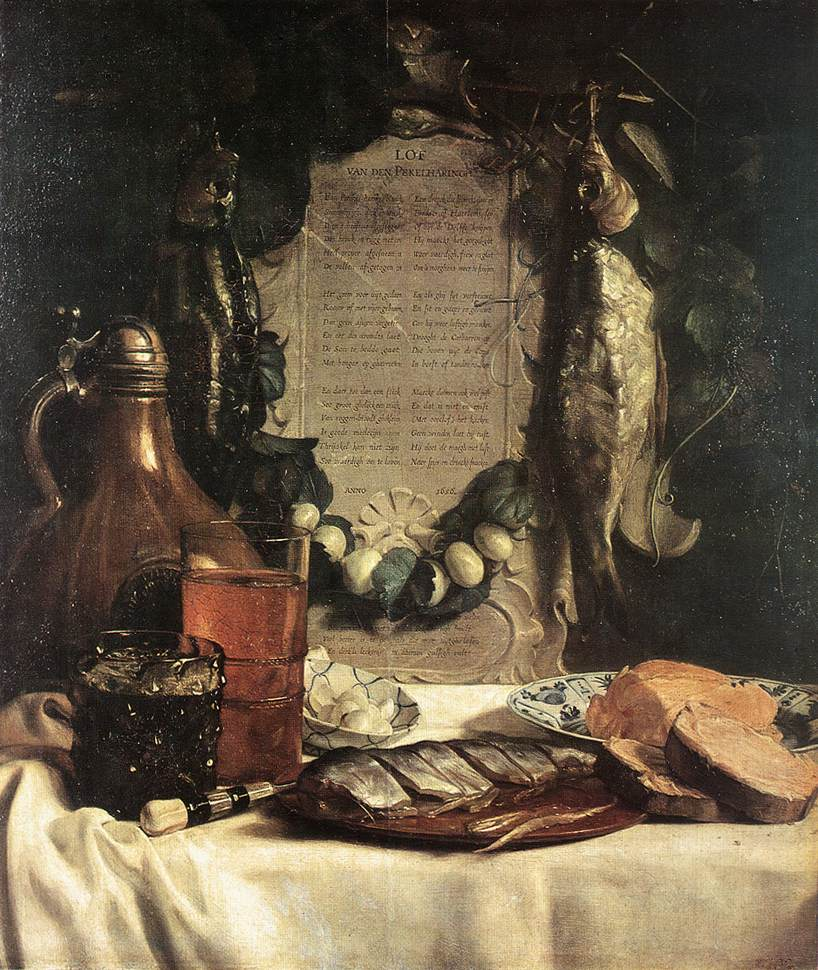
Ode to the Herring, still life with herring and poem by Jacob Westerbaen, 1656

According to the RKD he was born into an artistic family as the son of Salomon de Bray and Anna Westerbaen (sister of the painter Jan and the poet Jacob Westerbaen). He was the brother of the painters Jan, Dirck, and Jacob de Bray.

He is known for fruit and flower still life paintings and some italianate landscapes. He died young 4 days after his father, probably from an outbreak of the plague in Haarlem.
