= Zijlpoort (Haarlem) =

Coordinates: 52°23′0″N 4°37′47″E

The Zijlpoort was a city gate in Haarlem, built in the 17th century. Salomon de Bray was involved in the design. It is depicted on the painting "De Zijlpoort van Haarlem" (c. 1670) by Gerrit Berckheyde. It was named after "Het Zijl", a small stream coming from the dunes, that was later dug out to become the Brouwersgracht. The Zijlpoort was demolished in 1824.
