= Dirck de Bray =

Dutch painter (c.1635–1694)

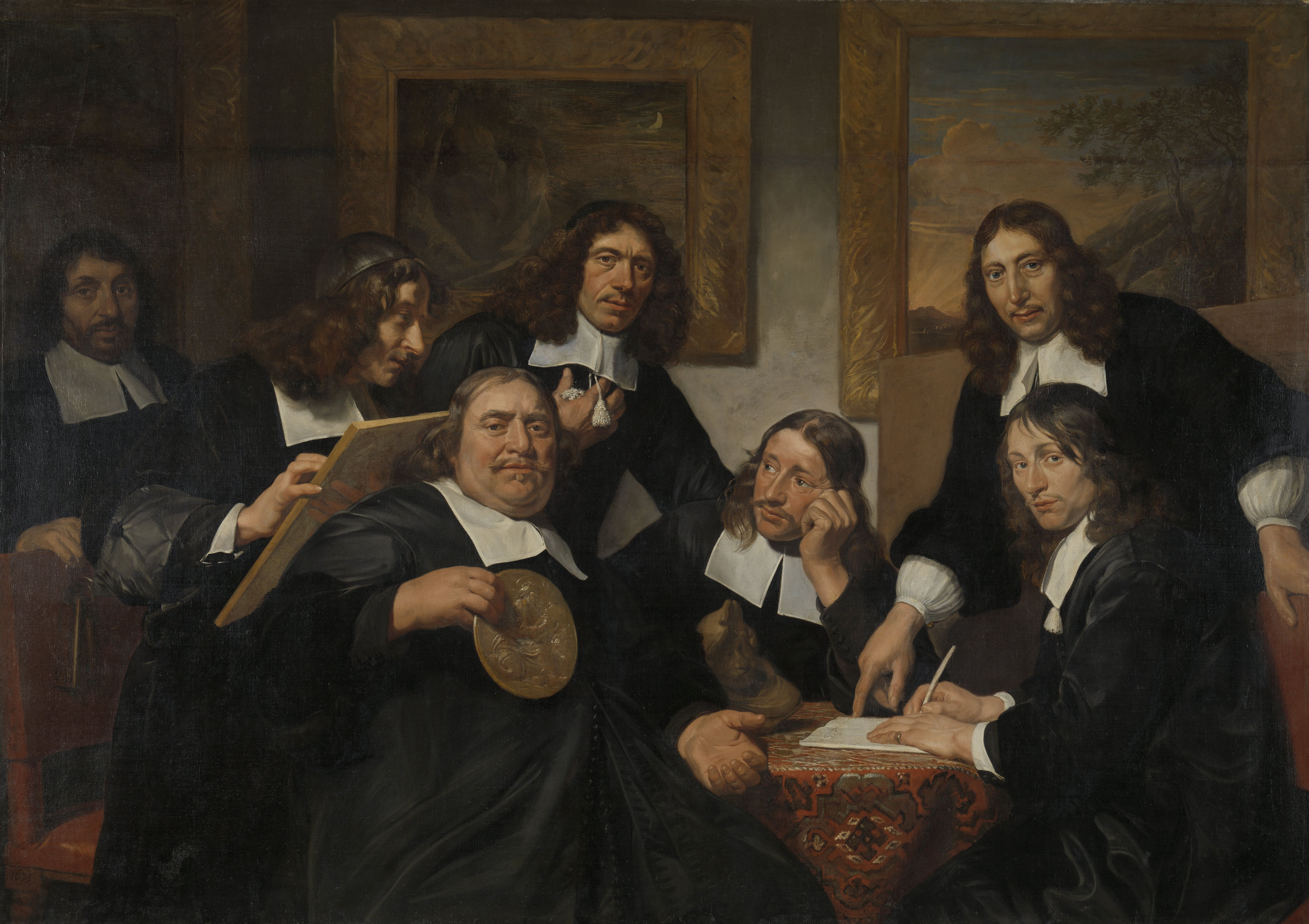
Painting of "The Governors of the Guild of St. Luke" by Dirck's brother Jan de Bray, with a portrait of Dirck upper right.

Dirck de Bray (c. 1635 in Haarlem – 1694 in Goch) was a Dutch Golden Age painter.

== Biography ==
According to Houbraken he was a multi-talented son and pupil of the painter and architect Salomon de Bray. He was known as a flower painter, but he could also sculpt. He carved a wooden bust of his father's head, that Houbraken admired and used for his engraving of Salomon in his "Schouburg". He became a monk in the Gaesdonck monastery near Goch. He became a member of the Haarlem Guild of St. Luke in 1671. Dirck was born into an artistic family. His brother Jan became a well-known painter, and his brother Joseph was also a painter, though he died young. His sister Cornelia married Jan Lievens. His mother was Anna Westerbaen, the sister of the painter Jan Westerbaen, and the poet Jacob Westerbaen. He was a printmaker and painted flower- and hunting still lifes. After 1678 he moved to the Gaesdonck monastery.

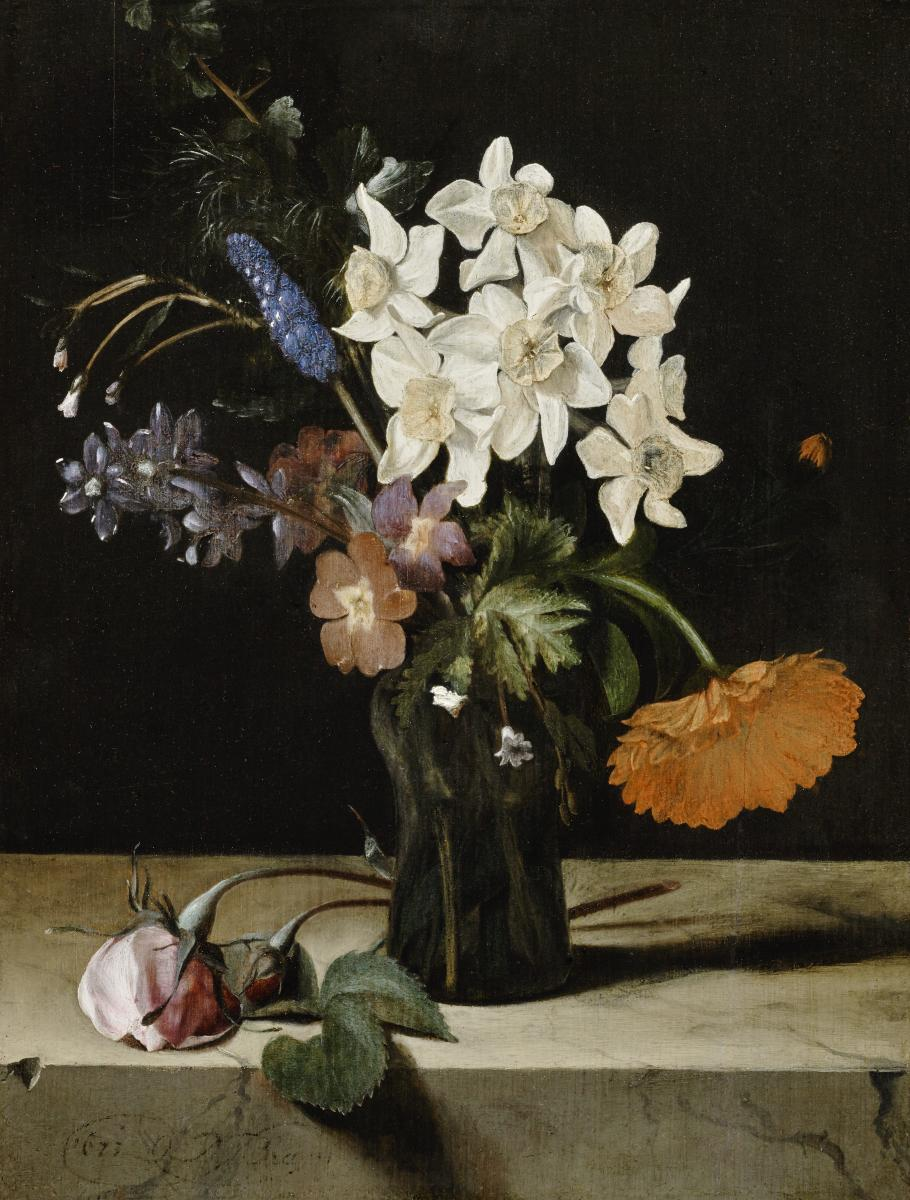
