= Jan de Bray =

Dutch painter (c.1627–1697)

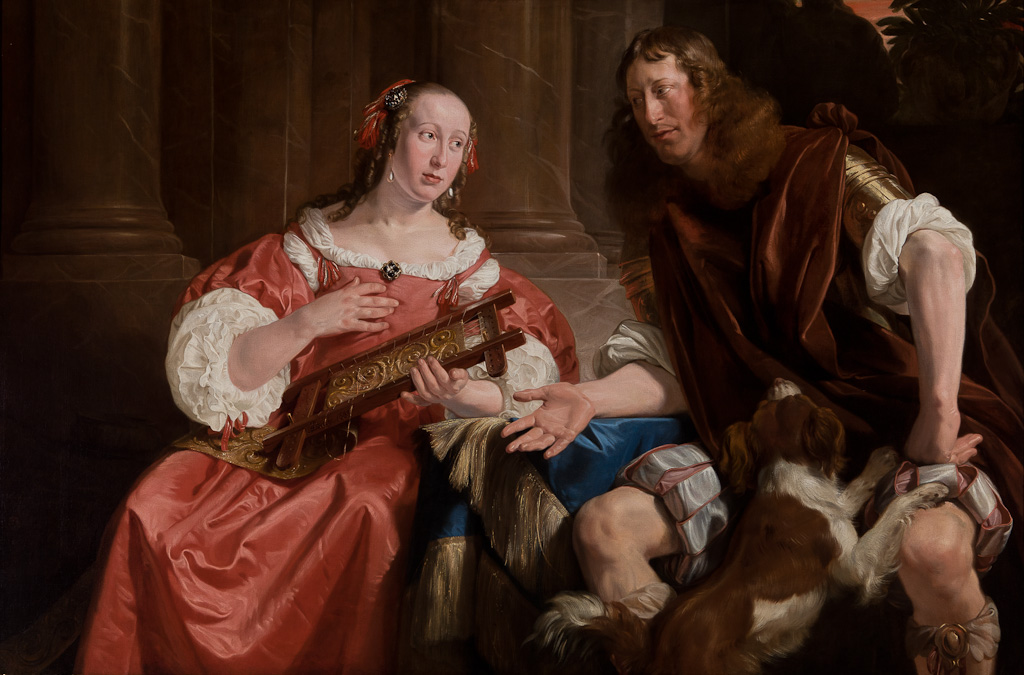
De Bray and his wife as Ulysses and Penelope, 1668

Jan de Bray (c. 1627 – April 4, 1697) was a Dutch Golden Age painter. He lived and worked in Haarlem until the age of 60, when he went bankrupt and moved to Amsterdam.

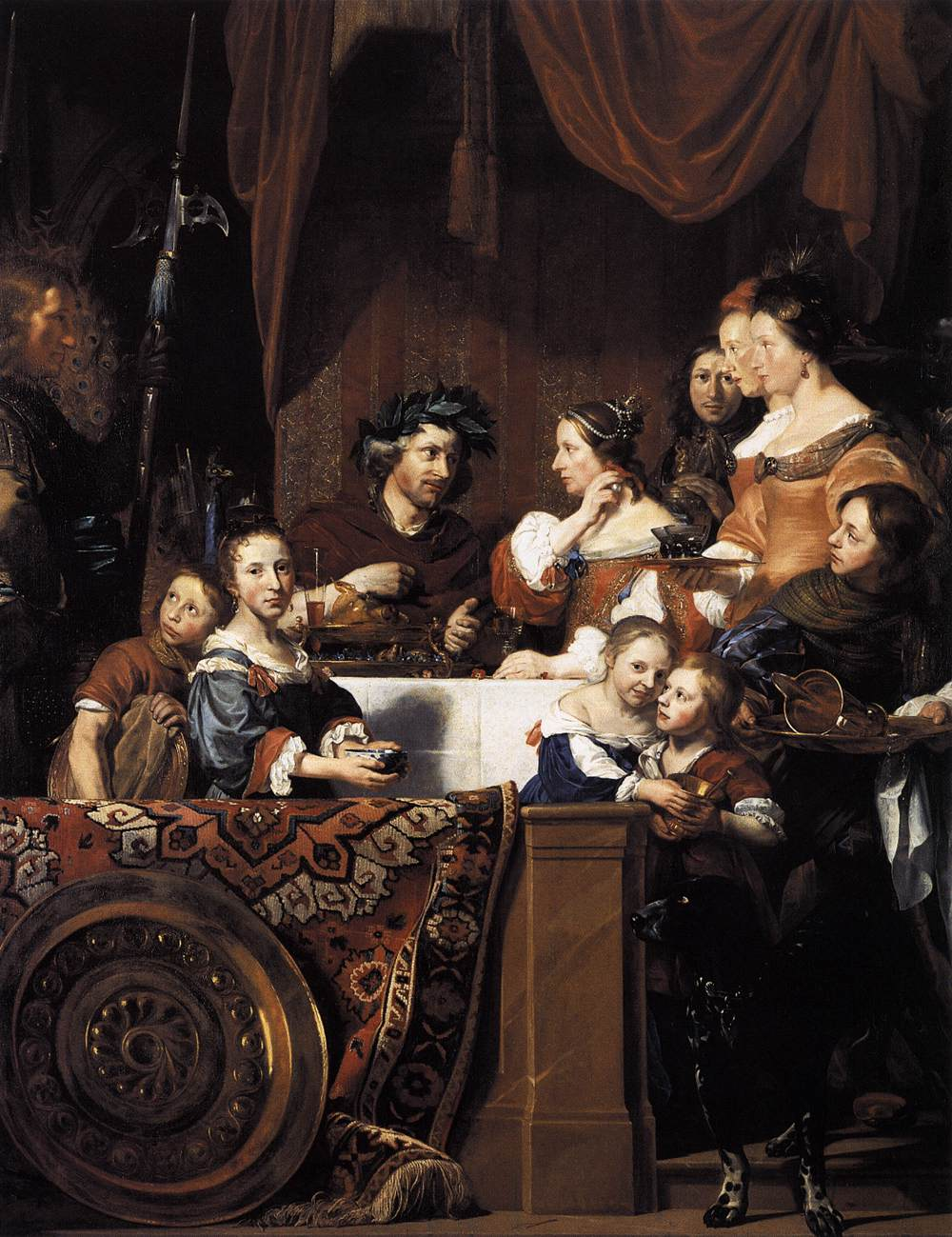
In his family portrait depicting the banquet of Antony and Cleopatra at the moment when Cleopatra puts her earring in the wine, Jan is depicted standing on the left. In the earlier version, the sons look up to the father, and in this version, the brothers (all since deceased except for Dirck) look at Jan.

Jan de Bray was influenced by his father Salomon de Bray, and the portraitists Bartholomeus van der Helst, and Frans Hals. De Bray's works are mainly portraits, often of groups, and history paintings. He specialised in combining the two genres in the portrait historié, portraits of historical figures using contemporary figures, including himself and his family. Among his finest works are two versions of the Banquet of Cleopatra, using his own family, including himself, as models (Royal Collection, 1652, and Currier Museum of Art, New Hampshire, 1669). The second version has great pathos, as most of those depicted had died in the plague of 1663–4.

== Biography ==
Jan de Bray was born in Haarlem. According to Houbraken he was the most famous pupil of his father, the painter, architect and poet Salomon de Bray. Houbraken called Jan the "pearl in Haarlem's crown". Houbraken saw a painting by de Bray of David and the Return of the Ark of the Covenant in the collection of Arnoud van Halen in Amsterdam, dated 1697, that he admired for its realistic flesh tones in the forms of David playing the harp and the Levites behind him. Houbraken also mentioned some black and red chalk drawings by him that he saw at the Amsterdam home of Isaak del Court.

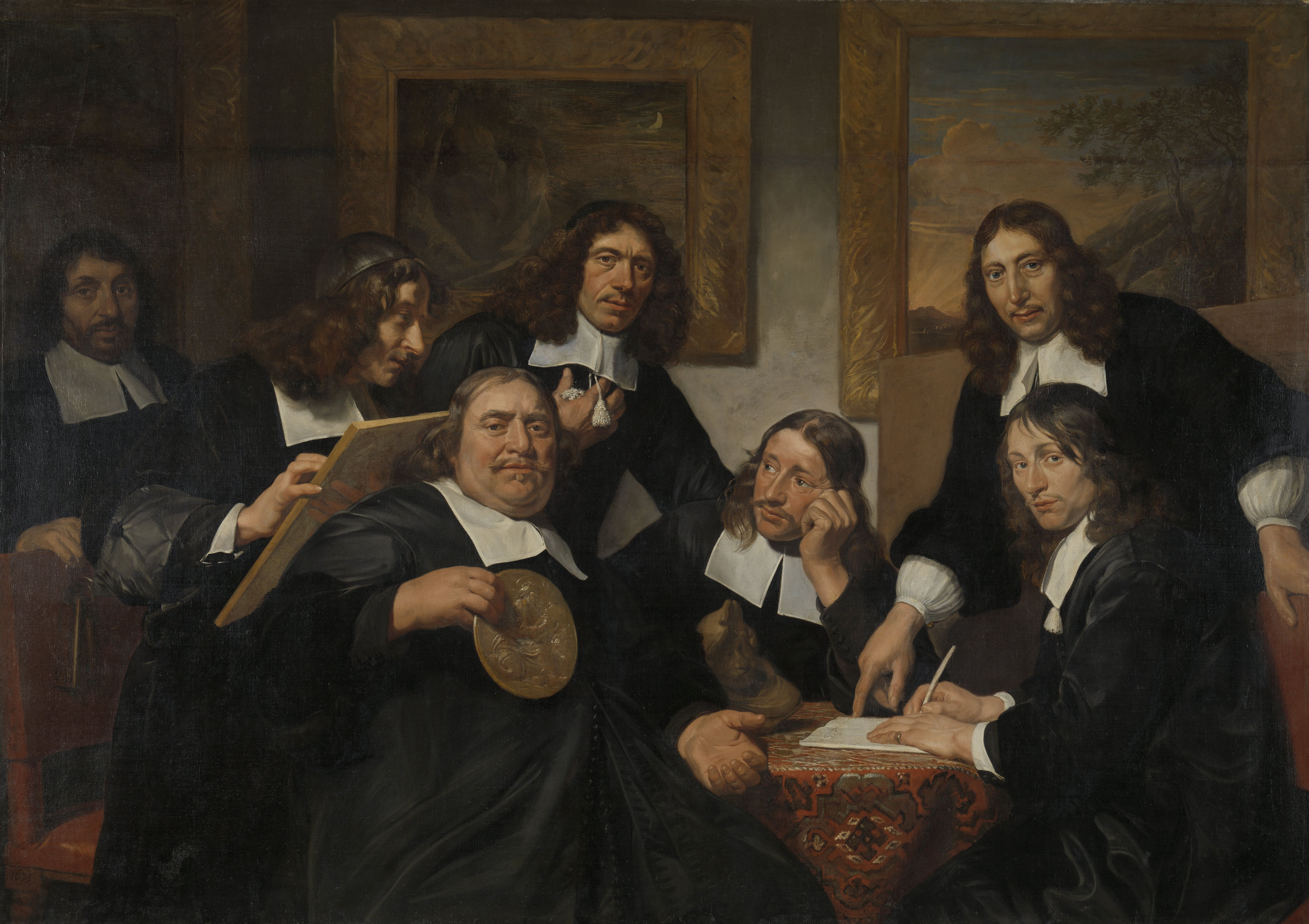
The Painter's Guild in 1675. Jan de Bray's self-portrait is the second from the left, and his brother Dirck de Bray is standing upper right.

He spent most of his career working in Haarlem, where he was for many years dean of the Haarlem Guild of St. Luke. His brother Dirck de Bray was a flower painter who later became a monk in the monastery at Gaesdonck near Goch. His brother Joseph was also a painter. His mother was Anna Westerbaen, the sister of the painter Jan Westerbaen and the poet Jacob Westerbaen. His sister Cornelia married Jan Lievens.

De Bray survived most of his family during an outbreak of the plague in Haarlem in 1664. He lost his father, his brother Joseph and three other siblings within two months of each other. His wives – Maria van Hees whom he married 21 October 1668, Margaretha de Meyer whom he married in 1672, and Victoria Stalpert van der Wielen whom he married 30 January 1678 – each died before him; Victoria shortly after giving birth to their son, Johan Lucas. In 1689 he was declared bankrupt as a Haarlem citizen and moved to Amsterdam, where he died, though he was buried in Haarlem.

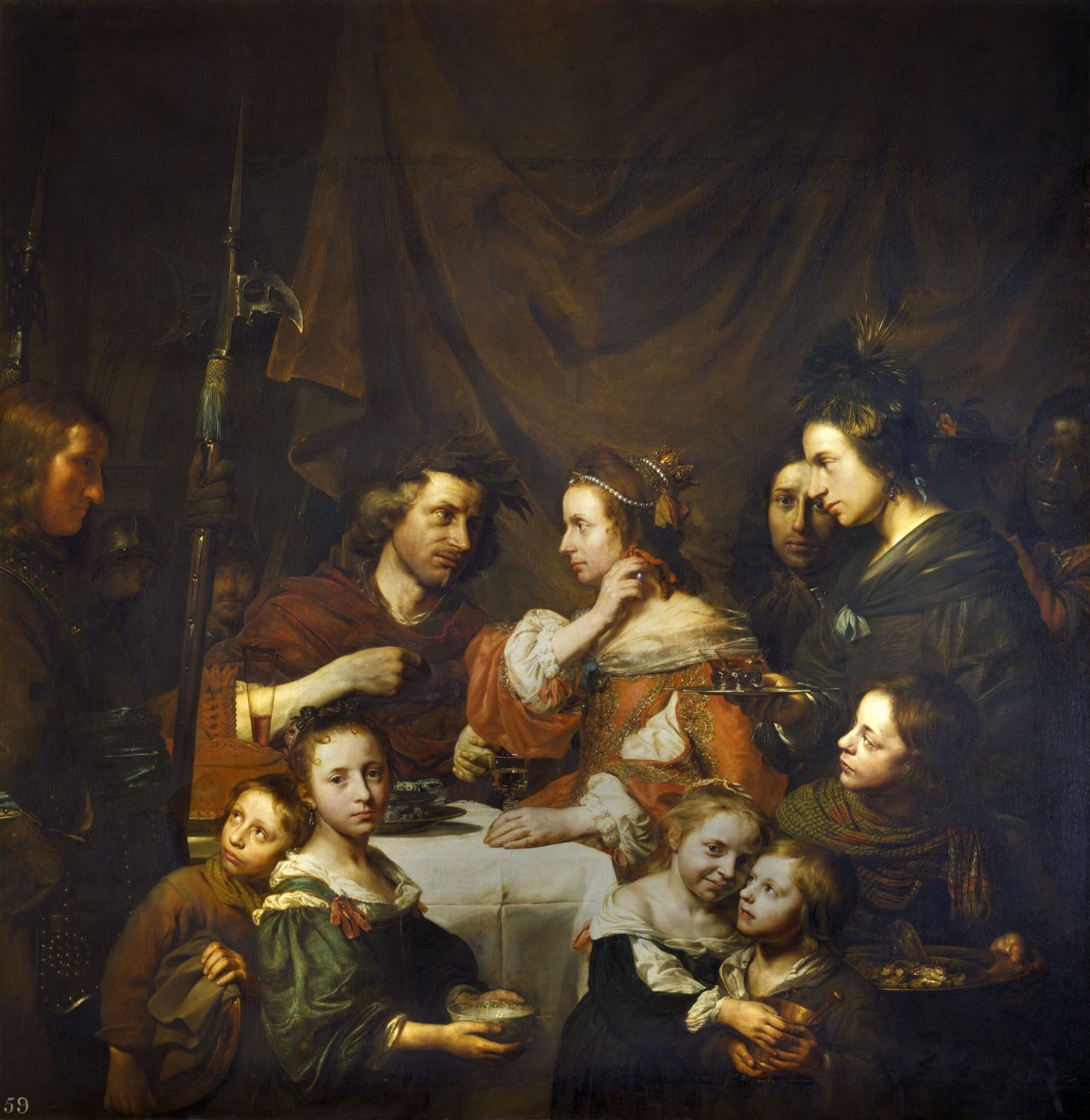
Cleopatra puts the pearl in the wine, Royal Collection, 1652 (first version)

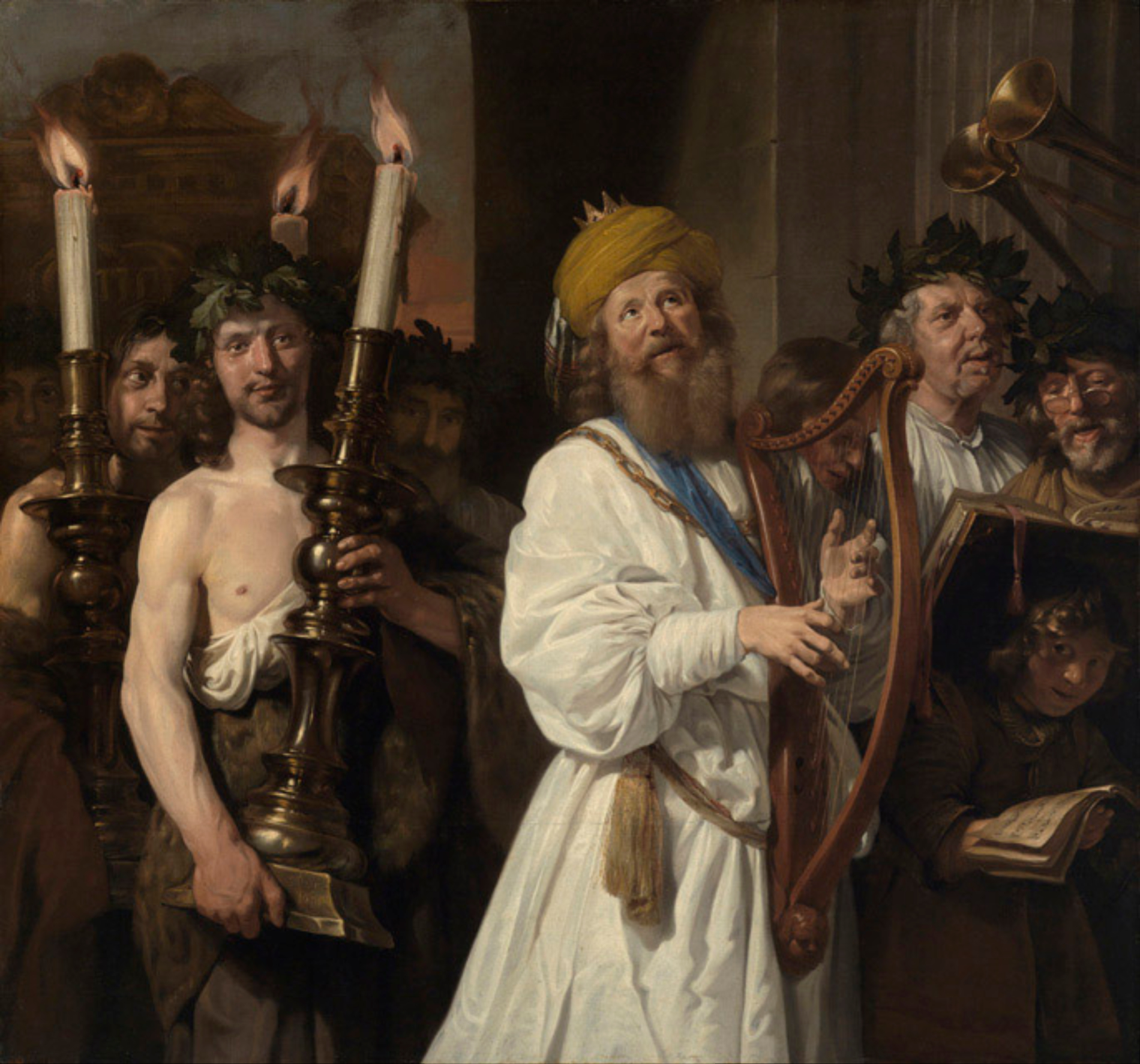
"David and the Ark of the Covenant", 1670

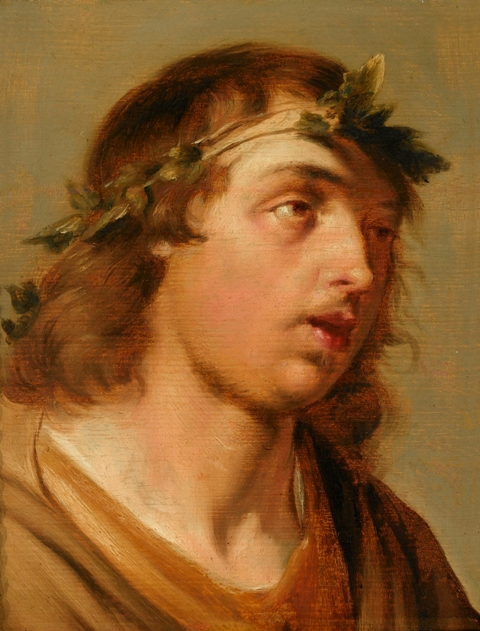
Bacchus, showing loose brush strokes

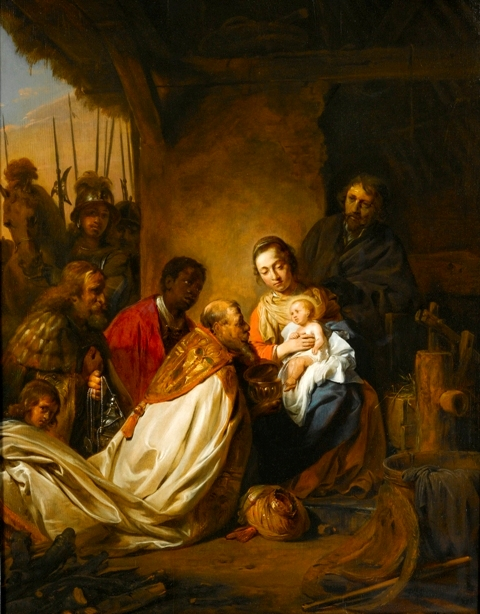
The Adoration of the Magi, a typical altarpiece for a schuilkerk

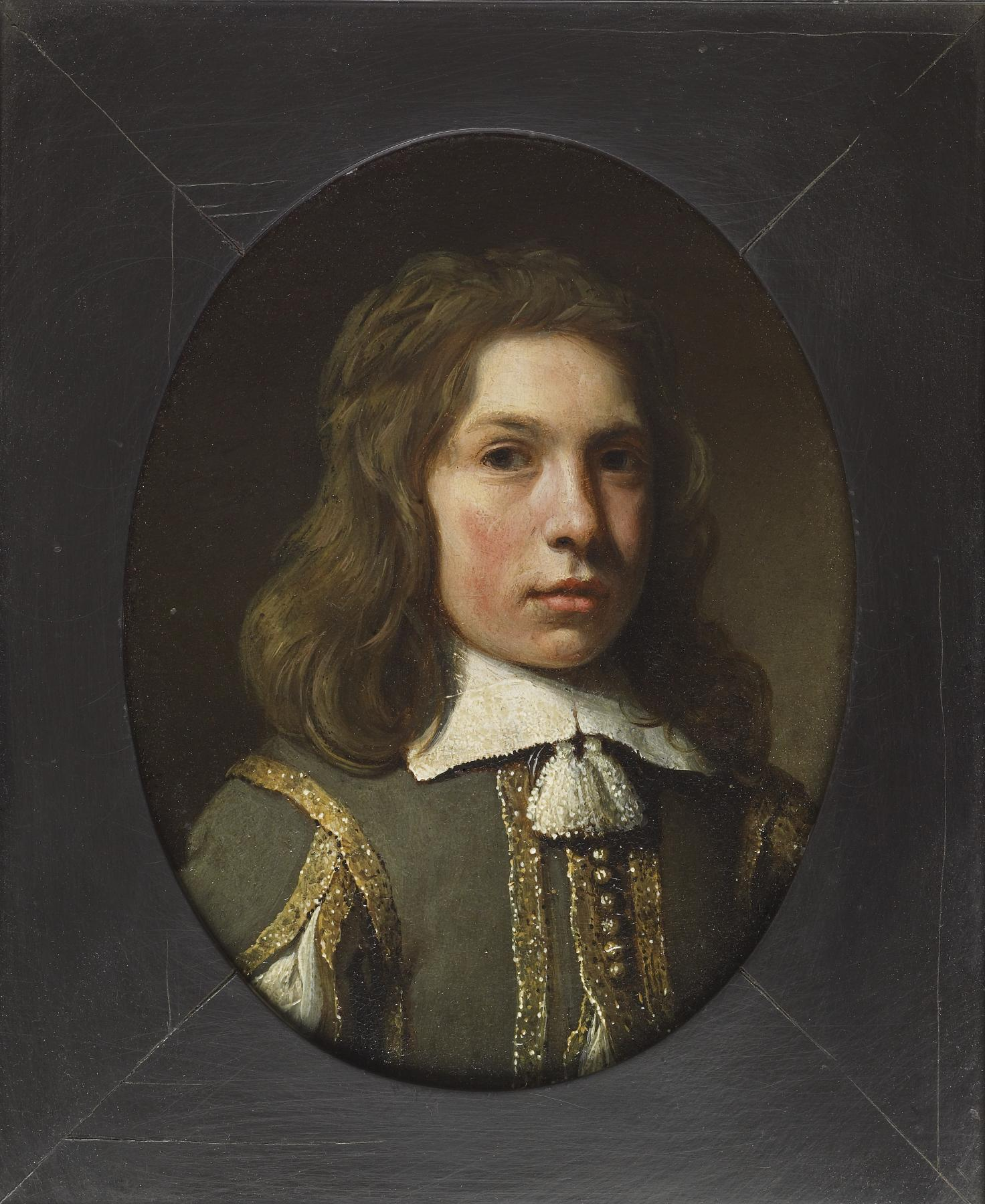
Head of a Boy. The Walters Art Museum.

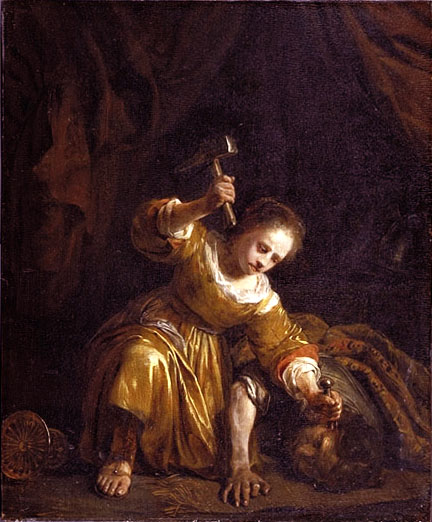
Jael and Sisera, 1659. York Museums Trust.
