= Officer Down Memorial Page =

Website that shows officers who passed during their time on duty

ODMP.org
- Website type: Online database
- Available in: English
- Creator: Chris Cosgriff
- Website: odmp.org
- Commercial: Advertiser-supported
- Registration: Optional
- Launched: 1996

The Officer Down Memorial Page, Inc. (ODMP) is a non-profit organization that maintains a website listing American law enforcement officers and police dogs who have died in the line of duty. The Police Memorial Society has listed ODMP as a recognized memorial resource used to commemorate law-enforcement officers killed in the line of duty.

== History ==
The ODMP was established in 1996 by Chris Cosgriff, then a freshman at James Madison University. Originally, it focused only on officers who were recently killed at the time, but it gradually expanded to include officers killed in the line of duty dating as far back as 1791.

The ODMP claims to be accessed by over 250,000 unique visitors per month. Its research staff are volunteers managed by a lieutenant from the New York City Police Department. The organization has uncovered hundreds of "forgotten" line-of-duty deaths and has assisted in ensuring those officers are properly recognized on appropriate police memorials.

In 2000, the ODMP was granted 501(c)(3) tax-exempt status. The operation of the site is paid for through private contributions, as well as from the proceeds from a gift shop selling T-shirts, bumper stickers, and other items. The site is no longer advertising-free as it had been in the past.

In 2007, the ODMP partnered with SharedBook Inc. to create The Officer Down Memorial Book, for sale from the gift shop.

In 2010, the ODMP became funded in part through two $150,000 grants awarded by the Bureau of Justice Assistance, Office of Justice Programs of the U.S. Department of Justice. One of those grants was to provide resources on benefits available to survivors of fallen law enforcement officers but this feature is no longer offered to its visitors.

By 2017, the ODMP only maintains its main website for American line of duty deaths and no longer offers separate sites for Canada, Australia, Central Europe or New Zealand law enforcement deaths.

== Criteria ==
The ODMP maintains a detailed list of criteria.

The site lists law enforcement officers from all levels of government who have died in the line of duty due to criminal violence, accident, injury, illness or natural causes as well as those who are killed off duty if they are targeted for their law enforcement affiliations or if they are acting at the time in an official capacity to protect the safety or property of others. Military investigators or special agents are included if working for official investigation services, as are other military personnel, including military police and peacekeepers if they are engaged in law enforcement at the time of their deaths.

The ODMP does not list deaths that result from such factors as officer misconduct, the influence of voluntarily-imbibed alcohol or controlled substances, suicide, or officer negligence. It also excludes deaths caused by off-duty car accidents or private service to a security company or private military company.

== Layout ==
Each officer listed has a profile, typically displaying a picture or photograph, if available, the agency or department the officer worked for, their rank, years served with the agency or department, age, badge number and date of death, as well as a brief description of the events that led up to and caused the officer's death. Most profiles include the official shoulder patch of the agency that the officer worked for and the website continues to seek pictures of patches that are not in its database.

If the death was the result of an encounter with a criminal suspect, the ODMP does not usually give the suspect's name. However, it will state, if known, whether the suspect was apprehended, what sentence they have received if convicted, as well as if the suspect was acquitted or paroled. The profile ends with a list of all the agencies the officer ever served with, as well as any military experience and the immediate surviving relatives, though it does not give their names.

Each officer's profile has a "Reflections" section where visitors can post comments. These comments are moderated and negative, derogatory or abusive postings are removed.

There is a search function that allows searching by last name, agency, state, range of years or cause of death.

== See also ==
- North American Game Warden Museum
