= Kingdom of Loathing =

2003 online game

- The Kingdom of Loathing logo.
- Developer: Asymmetric Publications
- Publisher: Asymmetric Publications
- Designer: Zack "Jick" Johnson
- Platforms: Web browser; www.kingdomofloathing.com
- Release: 10 February 2003
- Genre: Turn-based role-playing game
- Mode: Single-player with some multiplayer interaction

Kingdom of Loathing (abbreviated KoL) is a browser-based multiplayer role-playing game designed and operated by Asymmetric Publications, including creator Zack "Jick" Johnson with a small team. The game was released in 2003, with ongoing small updates continually released.

It uses hand-drawn stick figure graphics and writing characterized by surreal humor, word play, parody and references to popular culture. In KoL, a player's character fights monsters for experience, and acquiring meat (the game's currency), and/or items, through a turn-based system. Players may also interact with each other through player versus player competition, participate in the in-game economy by trading goods and services, organize their characters into clans, work together to complete clan dungeons, and speak to each other in many different chat channels.

The game is also particularly notable for managing to be financially successful purely from donations and the purchase of merchandise rather than from advertising or subscription fees, which are used by many online games. In 2008, the game had between 100,000 and 150,000 regular players. These players form an active community which frequently organizes fan meet-ups and runs an internet radio station. The game has been generally well received by critics. In 2012, Mr. Card Game, a tabletop game based on Kingdom of Loathing, was launched on Kickstarter. On 10 August 2017, Asymmetric launched West of Loathing, a Kingdom of Loathing spin-off single-player role-playing video game for Linux, macOS, and Windows. A second spin-off, Shadows Over Loathing, was released in 2022.

== Gameplay and features ==
A screenshot of combat against scarab beatles

Gameplay involves fighting monsters, completing quests, gaining skills and stats, and accumulating items and meat.

In KoL's turn-based gameplay, a player's character is supplied with a number of adventures each day, at a base of 40, although this can be increased. The game day resets at a time called "rollover". Characters are allotted forty adventures every rollover, though they can increase that number with various equipment and items. Additional adventures can be acquired by consuming food and booze. However, only a limited amount of each can be consumed each day, and drinking too much booze puts the character into a drunken stupor for the remainder of the day. During rollover, drunkenness and fullness levels are reset, and minor amounts of hit points and mysticality points are restored. Although a character can accumulate a large number of adventures, the number is reduced to 200 at rollover.

Most actions in the game use up adventures, including crafting items and exploring the game world (adventuring). When exploring, players experience combat encounters, in which they fight monsters, as well as non-combat encounters. Combat is turn-based, meaning that the player and the monster take turns attacking one another using weapons, skills and items. Players who successfully defeat a monster receive substats, pieces of meat (the game's currency), and various items. Non-combat encounters simply present the reader with a text description of an event, occasionally allowing the player to choose how to respond to that event.

After gaining enough substats, players will gain levels, allowing them to access new areas and quests. Characters can combine items by using "meat paste" (a substance analogous to glue), and can also cook food, mix cocktails and smith weapons and armor. Characters may also earn trophies or tattoos for various in-game achievements. Puzzle-solving is an important part of the game, with the solutions often involving a certain item combination or the completion of tasks in different zones.

=== Player interaction ===
While Kingdom of Loathing's player versus environment content is largely single-player, some features allow multiplayer interaction through their chat.

Player versus player (PvP) combat is voluntary, features a randomized selection of non-interactive minigames, and is subdivided into seasons. The winner of the PvP battle can take fame or items from the loser, who loses stats if attacking.

The game features an integrated chat system which is available only after completing a basic test of English grammar and spelling. There are many chat channels, including a channel in which all chat must follow the syllabic conventions of English haiku. Most of the chat channels are moderated; those who violate the chat rules are banned. Players can also send messages and gift packages to each other in-game, and the official Kingdom of Loathing forums are another active venue for discussion among players.

Upon reaching level 3, characters may join a clan, a band of cooperating characters. A clan has a clan hall which can be furnished with beneficial equipment as well as a clan stash for sharing useful items. Clan members can chat with each other in a private chat channel. In 2008, a multiplayer dungeon was added which allows clan members to raid cooperatively in Hobopolis, the underground city of hobos. Eurogamer likened Hobopolis to World of Warcraft instances. Additional clan dungeons have since been added, including the Slimetube, Dreadsylvania, and the limited-time Haunted Sorority House.

Players can buy a store in The Mall of Loathing and sell their character's items to other players, once they reach level 9. Direct trading between two players is also possible, and in the trade chat channel users can auction items and advertise shops. This functionality has created a complex in-game economy which author Ted Friedman, in his book Electric Dreams: Computers in American Culture, described as "vibrant". The Kingdom of Loathing economy was the subject of an academic study, Economics in the Kingdom of Loathing: Analysis of Virtual Market Data in 2011.

=== Character classes ===
Players choose from six classes when they create a character. Each class has various items that characters obtain by completing class-specific quests. Characters also receive non-tradable class-dependent items as a reward for completing harder ascensions. The classes can be split into groups based on the primary character attribute associated with them. The main attribute is used as experience points in-game.

- Muscle classes: The two muscle classes are Seal Clubber and Turtle Tamer. Muscle classes depend on strength and fighting ability. A character's Max HP is determined by his/her muscle, and Muscle classes gain an innate +50% boost to their Max HP.
- Mysticality classes: The mysticality classes are Pastamancer and Sauceror. Gameplay for mysticality classes is focused on spellcasting and the use of magic. A character's Max MP is determined by his/her Mysticality, and Mysticality classes gain an innate +50% to their Max MP.
- Moxie classes: The moxie classes, Disco Bandit and Accordion Thief, use charm and dexterity to achieve success.

=== Familiars ===
Familiars are creatures that can accompany players in combat, performing (usually) helpful actions. Familiars are often instrumental in the completion of quests. Familiars possess many abilities; for example, a Sabre-Toothed Lime attacks monsters, a Leprechaun grants extra meat after combat, and a Hovering Sombrero increases stat gains from combat. Some familiars, such as the Ninja Pirate Zombie Robot, are very difficult to acquire.

=== Ascension ===
Ascension is a feature that allows characters to start the game over and play through it again from the beginning, similar to a New Game Plus feature. This feature becomes available after the game's final quest is completed. Ascending will allow the player to receive Karma for their actions, which can be used to purchase special items before choosing a new path/lifestyle. Players who embark on a new path have their character's experience levels reset to one, but they retain their currency and items. Ascending players can also choose to make their ascension more difficult by taking on various restrictions, such as not being able to eat or drink, in exchange for karma, which can be used to purchase items. There are special paths which could have the player play as a special class or have a unique gimmick (such as every zone is on fire, damaging you). In addition, the game features a leaderboard system which allows players to see one another's ascension speeds and compete for the fastest ascensions.

== Plot ==
=== Setting ===
Kingdom of Loathing takes place in Asymmetric Publication's Loathing universe; however, the specific time is unknown. It was inspired by Asymmetric Publication's earlier game Krakrox the Barbarian and even included into the game's lore as the forefather of adventurers and banisher of the monsters of the dark continent that would later become the Kingdom of Loathing. The game is humorous in nature, and most quests, battles and individual item descriptions include jokes, witticisms, or references to popular culture. Many quests parody the tropes found in other role-playing games. The player takes on the role of an adventurer who solves problems and kills monsters in this fantasy-based kingdom.

=== Story ===
Thanks to the three mighty architectural elders before the days of Yore (which includes Boris the Warrior, Jarlsberg the Wizard, and Sneaky Pete the Cool Guy), the Kingdom of Loathing used to be a peaceful place to loathe one another under the Kingdom's ruler, King Ralph XI.

However, one day, the Naughty Sorceress arrived and "imprismed" (imprisoned in a prism) King Ralph XI. Afterwards, the monsters that hid away reemerged, and under the control of the Naughty Sorceress, caused chaos in the kingdom.

In King Ralph's absence, most of the power in the Kingdom of Loathing is held by the Council of Loathing, but not much has been able to get done, so adventurers (such as the player) were called into action. There are two storylines that the player is encouraged to participate. These storylines are Me and My Nemesis, and Naughty Sorceress Quest (main campaign). Players can also unlock quests from other sources, some of which are available only after ascending.

In Me and My Nemesis, when the player first arrives to the kingdom and finishes the tutorial, they are advised to join their class's Guild Hall.

Once the player nearly reaches level 4, they will be informed that their guild's mystical artifact has been stolen by their nemesis, a person that opposes the player's class and has been assigned to the player, as nobody else wanted to deal with them. The player will be sent to retrieve the power-drained legendary artifact from the Misspelled Cemetary and its power source from the Clownlord Beelzebozo.

Later, after increasing experience, the character will be informed of their nemesis's location in The Dark and Sinister Cave, only for them to escape before defeat. After dealing with increasingly tough assassins sent by the character's nemesis, the player will eventually be able to reach their nemesis's Secret Tropical Island Volcano Lair.

Once they find the way to enter, deal with their body guards, and defeat their nemesis a second time, the nemesis will retreat to the volcano to absorb the power from the player's class statue. After defeating their nemesis a third time, the nemesis will pray to a demonic entity that will transform them into their ultimate form, but also power up your legendary weapon.

After defeating them for the fourth and final time, the nemesis will destroy the statue, burying themself as well as their lair, but no mystical artifact to be found. Upon returning to the player's class Guild Hall, they will be told that the artifact was never taken, but was sent out to be cleaned by the new guy Larry.

Prior to the Naughty Sorceress Quest, the Council of Loathing will gives quests to the character as they increase in level, from finding a mosquito larvae to starting (and finishing) a war between the Hippies and the Frat Boys, all in hopes to either fixing issues around the kingdom, finding possible ways to defeat the Naughty Sorceress, or for profitable gain. The final quest is given when the character has reached level 13 and finished the other quests.

By then, the Council will declare the character ready to take on the Naughty Sorceress, as she is holding a contest of some sorts.

After thinning out the competition by beating them up, the character is declared the winner, only for the Naughty Sorceress herself to thank the character for dealing with the last adventurers that served as a threat to her before knocking out the player by pink gas.

When the character wakes up, it is revealed from the skull of a barely alive adventurer named Frank that, due to the screwy nature of time at the Kingdom, the Naughty Sorceress has been terrorizing the kingdom for four thousand years, and the Council's corrupted nature prevented anyone from actually succeeding. With Frank's help through a maze, the character will come across 6 locks to the entrance. 6 different keys are required to enter (such as the keys of the three mighty architectural elders). After finding the keys and the many trials to the top of the Sorceress's tower, the player comes face to face with the sorceress herself, only to be beaten in her third form: a sausage powerful enough to cause any damage in capital letters. Frank will notice this and will tell the player to go back to find the Wand of Nagamar, the wand of the necromancer Nagamar who was responsible for misspelling the Misspelled Cemetary. After finding the wand, the character will fight the Naughty Sorceress once more and rearrange the spelling of her all-caps attack to counterattack, eventually leading to her sausage defeat.

Once the Naughty Sorceress has been defeated, her chamber will have been mostly destroyed, and King Ralph's Prism will appear. The player can then free King Ralph, thereby reinstating power to the King and causing the Council of Loathing to become obsolete, much to the dismay of the council members. The destruction of the prism will cause an astral gash to appear in the middle of the sky where the King was once imprismed. Upon returning to the council, they will tell the character that they have just discovered that the monsters are still running amok, and that the Naughty Sorceress wasn't the main culprit: it turns out that the monsters really hate the character. However, they also reveal that jumping into the Astral Gash will allow the character to ascend to Valhalla, afterlife hub of reincarnations and new routes, and only then will the monsters stop attacking the kingdom. It is up to the player to either continue playing side quests and leveling up or to ascend to play a new game whenever they decide to.

== Development ==
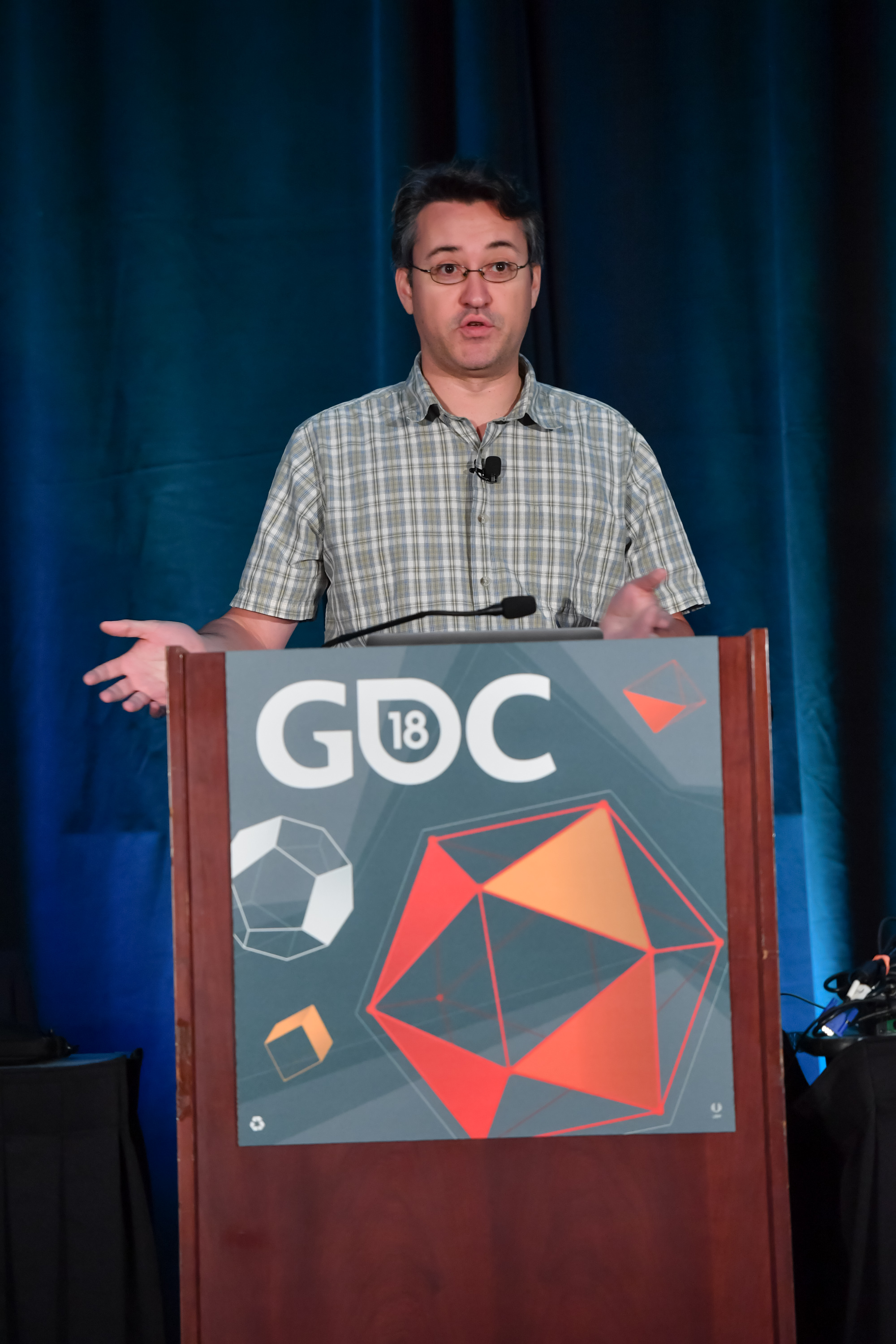
Zack Johnson at the 2018 Game Developers Conference

Zack Johnson, the game's creator, developed several games before Kingdom of Loathing but did not feel that they were good enough to release online. Deciding that he was taking the games he created too seriously, Johnson then set himself the challenge of creating one within a week and publishing the result online. The result was more of a joke than a game, and the initial content including classes and even the name of the game were stream of consciousness. The game was released in early 2003, and Johnson soon invited his childhood friend Josh Nite to contribute content as a writer and designer. Within a year, 300,000 player accounts had been created, far exceeding Johnson and Nite's expectations; Johnson has referred to the game's success as "a never ending series of astonishments". In 2008, the game had between 100,000 and 150,000 regular players.

In the game's early days, Johnson worked on the game during breaks while at work; however, 18 months or so after launch, the game was bringing in enough money for Johnson to quit his day job as a programmer and develop the game full-time. He then began to pay Nite for his work and after approximately two years hired two more developers. There are currently eight full-time employees working on Kingdom of Loathing, as well as three other employees who are working on a separate game. The game's creative process is fluid and loosely structured. According to Johnson, "At this point, I provide the overall direction. I do about a quarter of the writing, a quarter of the coding, and almost all of the artwork." The bulk of the writing was done by Nite, who also contributed design ideas, while two other developers, known in the game as Riff and HotStuff, work on writing, design, and coding.

According to Nite, the game's writing style owes itself to a humorous email exchange between himself and Johnson that began when the two separated after high school. These emails "helped us develop the shared comedic voice that KoL's written in". The game's developers cite text-based games such as Zork and Legend of the Red Dragon as creative influences, and Nite has compared the game to the Choose Your Own Adventure series of children's books.

The game has been in open beta since its initial release, and is continuously being worked on. New content is released weekly or monthly, and there is also unique holiday-themed content every Christmas, known as Crimbo. Occasionally, the developers stage world events such as the Gray Plague, which was similar to the Corrupted Blood incident in World of Warcraft.

In November 2014, Nite left Asymmetric Publications.

== Business model ==
Kingdom of Loathing is advertising-free and does not charge subscription fees.

Maintenance and development of the game is supported primarily through donations and players who donate US$10 to the game receive a powerful item known as a Mr. Accessory. Mr. Accessories can be equipped to give stat boosts or spent in the "Mr. Store" to buy powerful items (including special monthly items). Mr. Accessories and Mr. Store items may be traded freely between players. According to an interview with Zack Johnson from 2010, Johnson originally established the Mr. Accessory revenue model as "kind of an afterthought", but it became lucrative enough to allow him to work on the game full-time and eventually to hire several permanent employees.

== Community ==
Kingdom of Loathing has been praised for its welcoming and active player community. One of the most unusual aspects of the community is the large number of female players: according to Johnson, approximately 40% of players are female. Fans often gather at both official conventions, run by Asymmetric, and unofficial player-organized meet-ups, including the annual KoLumbus event. Players support the game by writing scripts to perform various in-game functions, using Greasemonkey, Java, Perl, and Lua, and have also developed a player-run wiki which offers puzzle solutions and walkthroughs. Longtime player and nerdcore rapper MC Frontalot is active in the community and included a Kingdom of Loathing-themed song on his 2010 album Zero Day.

Brett Bixler, founder of the Educational Gaming Commons at Pennsylvania State University, has hypothesized that the Kingdom of Loathing community is successful because it accounts for Richard Bartle's model of player personality types in massively multiplayer online roleplaying games, creating a balanced gameplay system that appeals to a wide variety of players. Researcher Martin Oliver addressed similar issues in a 2009 study of the Kingdom of Loathing player community, "Playing Roles in the MMORPG Kingdom of Loathing".

A Web-based SHOUTcast radio station, Radio KoL, was the "official unofficial" radio station of KoL. It was a 24/7 DJ-hosted station, with volunteer DJs drawn from the KoL user base. As well as the player-hosted music shows, development team members hosted shows on Radio KoL in which they discussed the state of the game and answered questions from players. Radio KoL was shut down in late 2019.

== Reception ==
Reception

Review scores
Publication	Score
Eurogamer	9/10
ESC Magazine	7/10
Gamezebo	3/5
Common Sense Media	2/5

Critical response for Kingdom of Loathing has been generally positive, with consistent praise for the game's humor and surrealism. The gameplay and content have been praised as "well designed" and having a "huge amount of content". Matt Gallant of Gizmodo said that the game is "actually very full-featured" with "a lot of content", and according to Worlds in Motion, "Kingdom of Loathing isn't just a great game, but a really unique and interesting MMO." Jay Is Games called it "a 'must play' game for RPG fans who want something different". Gamezebo criticized the interface, calling it "clunky", and several reviewers expressed concern that the game might be confusing to new players.

=== Controversy ===
In 2019, Johnson was accused of "physical and emotional" abuse by his ex-wife, U.C. Santa Cruz professor A.M. Darke, towards her and West of Loathing designer Kevin Simmons. She also alleged that he had removed part of the game to avoid crediting her for its development. Johnson denied the allegations of physical abuse, although he admitted "emotional immaturity and anger and cruelty" in a written apology. He later added Darke to the game's credits, claiming she had only provided feedback to the game and did not work on it in a design capacity. An ex-girlfriend of Johnson's, Bonnie Mattson, similarly alleged abusive behavior during a 2005 relationship.

== See also ==
- List of multiplayer browser games
