= Shadows Over Loathing =

2022 video game

- Developer: Asymmetric Publications
- Publisher: Asymmetric Publications
- Designers: Zack Johnson; Victor Thompson; Riff Conner; Duncan Fyfe
- Programmer: Victor Thompmson
- Artist: Wes Cleveland
- Writers: Zack Johnson; Riff Conner; Duncan Fyfe
- Composer: Ryan Ike
- Series: Kingdom of Loathing
- Platforms: macOS; Microsoft Windows; Nintendo Switch; PlayStation 4; PlayStation 5
- Release: macOS, Windows; November 11, 2022; Nintendo Switch; April 19, 2023; PlayStation 4, PlayStation 5 May 15, 2025
- Genre: Role-playing
- Mode: Single-player

Shadows Over Loathing is a 2022 role-playing video game developed by Asymmetric Publications. A follow-up to the 2017 game West of Loathing, it was released for Windows and macOS on November 11, 2022, and for Nintendo Switch on April 19, 2023.

== Gameplay ==
Shadows Over Loathing is a role-playing game. Set in a 1920s Lovecraftian setting, the player controls a customizable player character who must explore Ocean City to recover relics and find their missing Uncle Murray. Gameplay is split into six chapters, as the character hunts for relics in a different part of the city while completing side quests. To find the relics, the player character must solve puzzles and fight in turn-based combat. Combat involves using a variety of items, such as foods that grant buffs and throwable objects like baseballs and seltzer grenades.

== Summary ==
The player plays as a character they created who has been summoned by their Uncle Murray to go to his antique shop in Ocean City for something important. However, upon arriving, he is nowhere to be found. The character will have to find cursed objects in hopes of finding a trail to Uncle Murray. Throughout the chapters, the character will gain partners to accompany the character throughout the story. The character will also have encounters with fishpeople, hobos, the mob, vampires, Rufus (the protagonist's younger brother in West of Loathing), gatormen, shadow beings, and even a nemesis (depending on the character's class). As the story progresses, the player learns more about their nemesis and the owner of the cursed objects: the President of Shadows. Upon being summoned to Government Valley, the character will come face-to-face with their nemesis one last time before defeating them and being able to access the Black House, where the President of Shadows is holding Uncle Murray captive. Previous dream sequences and Uncle Murray reveal that the President of Shadows is Margaret, a woman who, after her dog dying, and being made fun of for wanting to become God when she grew up in order to let dogs live longer, and an explosion in her family barn (the source of the cursed objects), became the shadow president and gained power with the shadow energy from the cursed objects. The entrance to the Black House is locked by three pillars of Shadow Energy. If the player has helped the Hobos, the Mob, and Rufus with their side-quests, they can destroy the pillars for the character, rather than battling them. Finally reaching inside the Black House, Margaret reveals that she is opening a giant portal to control the Shadowcaster, source of the shadow energy, to become Empress of Shadows. The player can decide to sabotage the portal whenever they want, a point of no return and trigger for the final boss. Depending on the character's actions and partner's sidequests, there are many endings the player can receive, with them mainly starting with the defeat of the Shadowcaster by the player or their partner, or the Shadowcaster winning and absorbing everything. The rest of the ending sequence depends on the sidequests the player has or has not completed and their consequences. The game saves before the final boss, so the player can go back and try to get a different ending.

== Reception ==
Reception

Aggregate score
Aggregator	Score
Metacritic	82/100

Review score
Publication	Score
RPGamer	4/5

RPGamer felt as though Shadows Over Loathing was a good follow-up to West of Loathing and praised the humor, animation, and large amount of side quests. PC Gamer liked the turn-based combat and said that it was superior to West of Loathing's, but felt as though the humor was less effective. The A.V. Club called it a "worthy successor to one of the funniest games of all time" and singled out the puzzles, writing, and large amount of player choice.
