= West of Loathing =

2017 video game

- Developer: Asymmetric Publications
- Publisher: Asymmetric Publications
- Director: Zack Johnson
- Designer: Riff Connor
- Programmers: Victor Thompson; Chris Moyer
- Artist: Wes Cleveland
- Composer: Ryan Ike
- Series: Kingdom of Loathing
- Engine: Unity
- Platforms: Linux, macOS, Windows, Nintendo Switch, Stadia, iOS
- Release: Linux, macOS, Windows; August 10, 2017; Nintendo Switch; May 31, 2018; Stadia; July 1, 2020; iOS; TBA
- Genre: Role-playing
- Mode: Single-player

West of Loathing is a comedy adventure role-playing video game developed and released by Asymmetric Publications on August 10, 2017.

The game is set in the universe of Kingdom of Loathing, an earlier video game in the series. The game was well-received by critics, with Rolling Stone magazine describing it as "one of the year's best games." A standalone sequel, Shadows Over Loathing, was released in 2022.

== Gameplay ==
West of Loathing is a single-player role-playing video game with turn-based combat. The setting is a fantasy Western rendered in monochrome stick figure art style.

== Story ==
What happens in the game is generally decided by the player, such as the class and dialogue choices, but the story remains generally the same. First, the player leaves their family farm and makes their way to a town known as Boring Springs. After obtaining a horse, they then head to a town called Dirtwater, solving problems for the Manifest Destiny Railroad Company to eventually get to the city of Frisco, where they speak to a man named Emperor Norton. If they give him a crown he lets them build the railroad into Frisco, but if they don't, Norton gives the player an "Ant-Eye" virus (a reference to the Norton AntiVirus) and steals the train, forcing the player to fight him. After this, the player settles down in a very narrow house.

In the Reckonin' at Gun Manor DLC, the player heads to Gun Manor, a house owned by Terri Gun (the in-universe creator of the gun). The player then teams up with Flo, a ghost exterminator, to destroy the ghosts in the house. The player can either kill the ghosts or solve their problems peacefully, both paths revealing that Terri is a ghost herself.

== Development and release ==
West of Loathing was developed by Asymmetric Publications. The game was announced in May 2016 as a follow-up to the browser-based multiplayer online role-playing game Kingdom of Loathing (2003). West of Loathing was submitted to the Greenlight community voting system on digital distribution service Steam.

West of Loathing was released for Linux, macOS, and Windows on August 10, 2017. An iOS version was once scheduled for a 2017 release. A Nintendo Switch version was released for download on May 31, 2018. It was released for Stadia on July 1, 2020.

The DLC expansion pack Reckonin' at Gun Manor was released on February 8, 2019, for the PC version of the game. It was released on the Nintendo Switch on January 21, 2020.

== Reception ==
Reception

Aggregate score
Aggregator	Score
Metacritic	87/100

Review scores
Publication	Score
Destructoid	9/10
GameSpot	8/10
Nintendo Life	(NS) 9/10
Nintendo World Report	(NS) 8/10
PC Gamer (UK)	88/100
Polygon	9/10

West of Loathing received "generally favourable" reviews from professional critics according to review aggregator website Metacritic.

Writing for Polygon, Noah Caldwell-Gervais lauded West of Loathing's humorous writing, music, and its underlying "surprising intricacy of design," while PC Gamer reviewer Christopher Livingston called the game a "delightfully written RPG absolutely packed with humor," but criticized its relatively simple combat system. In a review for Rock, Paper, Shotgun, Alec Meer recommended the game and praised its warm and welcoming tone.

West of Loathing was awarded Best Comedy Game and nominated for Best Open World Game in PC Gamer's 2017 Game of the Year Awards, and was ranked #16 on Polygon's "50 Best Games of 2017." It was also nominated for "PC Game of the Year" at the Golden Joystick Awards, for "Gamer's Voice (Video Game)" at the SXSW Gaming Gamer's Voice Awards, and for the Seumas McNally Grand Prize at the Independent Games Festival Competition Awards.

=== Soundtrack ===
The music of West of Loathing was composed by Ryan Ike and gained praise as a "pitch-perfect Spaghetti Western soundtrack." The 20-track soundtrack was licensed and released by video game music label Materia Collective.
