= Off stone =

United Kingdom newspaper terminology

In the United Kingdom, off stone is the moment at which an edition of a newspaper is finalised for printing and no further changes can be made. "Off stone" comes a short time after the final deadline for submission of images or articles for editing. The term comes from the early days of printing when an imposing stone, a slab of stone or metal on which the type was set into a layout (or forme), was used to align the text.

Here is an example usage from the MediaGuardian on 29 January 2007:

Veronica Wadley (editor of the Evening Standard): "We have more stories, we have greater depth, we have comment, we have more information, and we have a later edition. Our West End final is off stone about 4pm, while the free papers are off stone at about midday."
