= Vossa Senhoria =

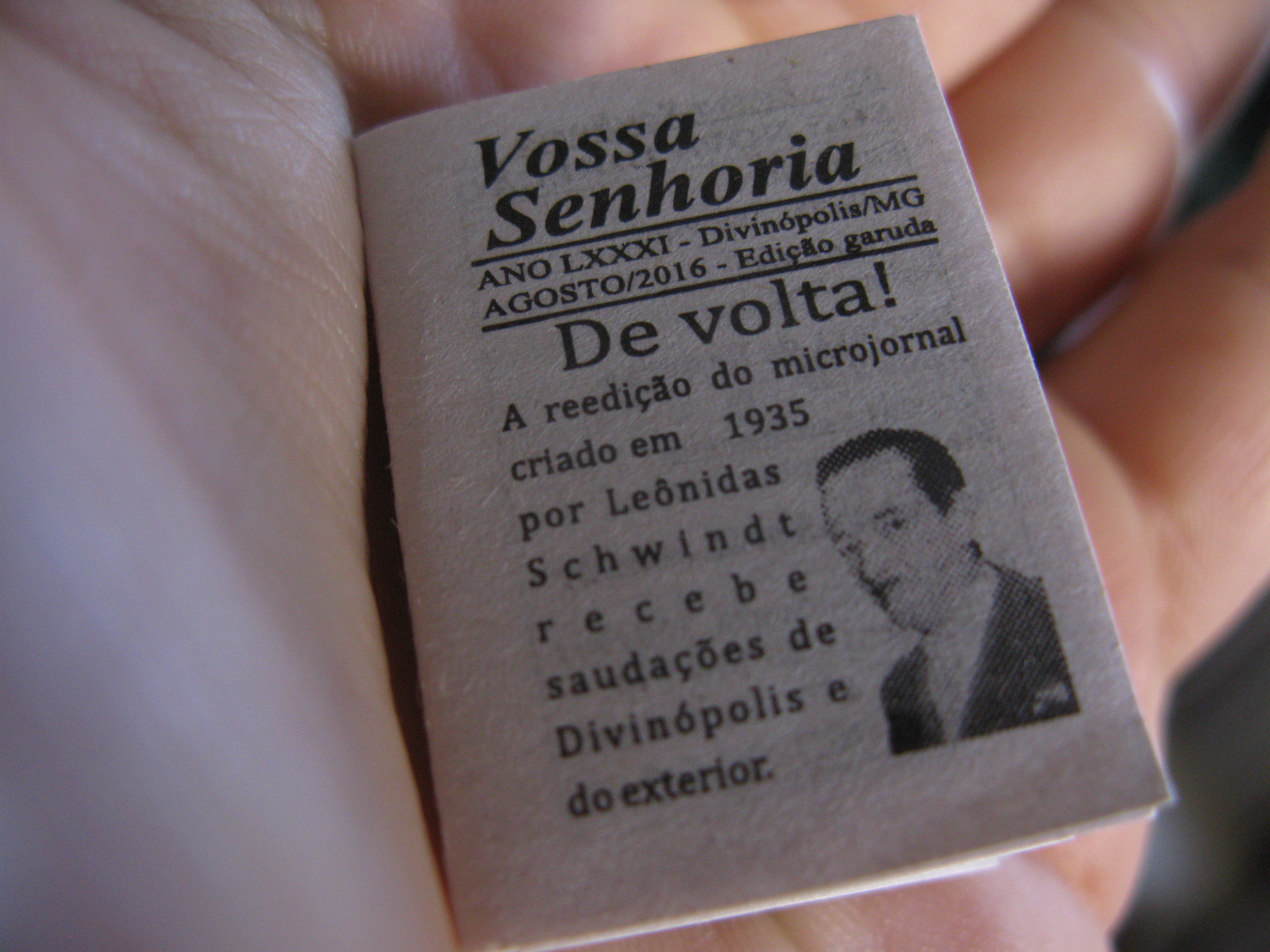
Reissue of Vossa Senhoria in 2016

Vossa Senhoria, a monthly newspaper first published in 1935 in Brazil, measures 1.4 in. x 1 in. (3.5 cm x 2.5 cm), making it the world's smallest newspaper in terms of size. Each issue has up to 16 pages, and includes photographs, illustrations and advertising space.

The publisher Leônidas Schwindt "saw the small size as a solution for creating a quality low-cost newspaper."
