= Advertising-free media =

Advertising-free media refers to media outlets whose output is not funded or subsidised by the sale of advertising space. It includes in its scope mass media entities such as websites, television and radio networks, and magazines.

The public broadcasters of a number of countries air without commercials. Perhaps the best known example of this is the United Kingdom's public broadcaster, the BBC, whose domestic networks do not carry commercials. Instead, the BBC, in common with most other public broadcasters in Europe, is funded by a television licence fee levied on the owners of all television sets.

A 2006 report by the Senate of Canada suggested that the country's public broadcaster, the Canadian Broadcasting Corporation, be funded sufficiently by the federal government so that it could air without any advertising.
