= Pallade veneta =

Newspaper

- Founded: 1687
- Ceased publication: 1751
- Language: Italian
- City: Venice

Pallade veneta was a newspaper that in toto ran from 1687 to 1751. It is preserved incompletely and in multiple forms. The published monthly ran to only 17 installments (January 1687 through May 1688). While it was published in Venice and reported on news from that locale, it also conveyed some news that was exchanged from other venues. Venice was a principal hub for news distribution. After its printing ceased, Pallade veneta continued as a series of weekly news sheets (avvisi in all but name). Surviving sources are discontinuous, making it difficult to create a full history of the publication.

Both in print and in manuscript the periodical can be associated with religious authority in general but not with specific religious figures. The celebration of liturgical feasts is a prominent topic of discussion, as are sermons. Much of the value of the printed issues lies in the exuberance of the writing (a feature not transferred to the manuscripts). Like other monthlies, these prints could have relied on manuscript avvisi for their news, and elaborated it from personal observation.

The portions that survive in manuscript (mainly from the years 1698–1704, 1714–17, and 1739–1751) become progressively more absorbed in advocating views of anonymous religious authorities. The final years reflect much of the pessimism that took hold of Venice in the 1740s.
