= Lists of monuments and memorials =

The lists of monuments and memorials have global coverage.

== Global ==
- List of martyrs' monuments and memorials
- List of firefighting monuments and memorials
- List of slavery-related memorials and museums
- List of monuments and memorials removed following the Russian invasion of Ukraine
- List of monuments to Soviet children in World War II
- List of standalone war memorials to the enemy

== Africa ==
=== Kenya ===
- List of sites and monuments in Kenya

=== Morocco ===
- List of sites and monuments in Morocco

=== Sierra Leone ===
- List of National Monuments of Sierra Leone

=== Swaziland ===
- List of National Monuments of Swaziland

=== Uganda ===
- List of National Cultural Sites in Northern Region, Uganda

== Americas ==
=== Argentina ===
- List of National Historic Monuments of Argentina

=== Canada ===
- List of Canadian war memorials
- List of royal monuments in Canada

=== Chile ===
- List of National Monuments of Chile
- List of National Monuments of Chile in Aysén Region

=== Colombia ===
- National monuments of Colombia
- List of national monuments of Colombia

=== Sint Maarten ===
- List of designated monuments in Sint Maarten

=== United States ===
- List of national monuments of the United States
- List of national memorials of the United States
- List of equestrian statues in the United States
- List of monuments at the United States Military Academy
- List of memorials and monuments at Arlington National Cemetery
- List of memorials to the Grand Army of the Republic
- List of monuments of the Gettysburg Battlefield
- List of Union Civil War monuments and memorials
- List of Confederate monuments and memorials
- Removal of Confederate monuments and memorials
- List of monument and memorial controversies in the United States
- List of monuments and memorials removed during the George Floyd protests
- List of monuments erected by the United Daughters of the Confederacy
- List of American Civil War monuments in Kentucky
- Civil War Monuments in Washington, D.C.
- Monument Avenue
- Los Angeles Historic-Cultural Monument
- List of monuments to African Americans
- List of monuments and memorials on the SIU-C Campus
- Memorials and services for the September 11 attacks

== Antarctica ==
- Historic Sites and Monuments in Antarctica

== Asia ==
=== Azerbaijan ===
- List of monuments of Azerbaijan

=== People's Republic of China ===
- Chairman Mao statues
- Declared monuments of Hong Kong

=== Republic of China ===
- Chiang Kai-shek statues

=== India ===
==== By type ====
- Archaeological sites in India
- Archaeoastronomical sites
- Ashoka pillars
- Bhimbetka
- Cave temples
- Cave paintings
- Colossal in situ sculptures
- Dolmens
- Forts
- Havelis
- IVC sites
- Menhirs
- Museums
- Rrock-cut temples
- Stepwell
- Statues:
  - List of famous statues in India
  - List of the tallest statues in India
  - List of equestrian statues in India
- War memorials:
- National War Memorial (India)
  - National Military Memorial
  - National Police Memorial (India)
  - National War Memorial Southern Command
  - Amar Jawan Jyoti
  - India Gate
  - Kargil War Memorial

==== National level ====
- List of World Heritage Sites in India
- Lists of Indian Monuments of National Importance
- List of State Protected Monuments in India
- Geological heritage sites

==== By state and cities ====
- List of Monuments of National Importance in Agra circle
- List of Monuments of National Importance in Ahmedabad district
- List of Monuments of National Importance in Andhra Pradesh
- List of state protected Monuments in Andhra Pradesh
- List of State Protected Monuments in Arunachal Pradesh
- List of Monuments of National Importance in Assam
- List of State Protected Monuments in Assam
- List of Monuments of National Importance in Aurangabad circle
- List of Monuments of National Importance in Bangalore circle
- List of Monuments of National Importance in Bijapur district
- List of Monuments of National Importance in Belgaum district
- List of Monuments of National Importance in Bidar district
- List of Monuments of National Importance in Bihar
- List of State Protected Monuments in Bihar
- List of Monuments of National Importance in Chennai circle
- List of Monuments of National Importance in Chhattisgarh
- List of State Protected Monuments in Chhattisgarh
- List of Monuments of National Importance in Daman and Diu
- List of Monuments of National Importance in Delhi
- List of State Protected Monuments in Delhi
- List of Monuments of National Importance in Dharwad district
- List of Monuments in Dhawalagiri Zone
- List of Monuments of National Importance in Goa
- List of State Protected Monuments in Goa
- List of Monuments of National Importance in Gujarat
- List of State Protected Monuments in Gujarat
- List of Monuments of National Importance in Gulbarga district
- List of Monuments of National Importance in Haryana
- List of State Protected Monuments in Haryana
- List of Monuments of National Importance in Himachal Pradesh
- List of State Protected Monuments in Himachal Pradesh
- List of Monuments of National Importance in Jharkhand
- List of State Protected Monuments in Jharkhand
- List of Monuments of National Importance in Kanchipuram district
- List of Monuments of National Importance in Karnataka
- List of State Protected Monuments in Karnataka
- List of Monuments of National Importance in Jammu and Kashmir
- List of State Protected Monuments in Jammu and Kashmir
- List of Monuments of National Importance in Kerala
- List of Monuments of National Importance in Lucknow circle
- List of Monuments of National Importance in Lucknow circle/North
- List of Monuments of National Importance in Lucknow circle/South
- List of Monuments of National Importance in Madhya Pradesh
- List of State Protected Monuments in Madhya Pradesh
- List of Monuments of National Importance in Madhya Pradesh/East
- List of Monuments of National Importance in Madhya Pradesh/West
- List of Monuments of National Importance in Maharashtra
- List of State Protected Monuments in Maharashtra
- List of Monuments of National Importance in Manipur
- List of State Protected Monuments in Manipur
- List of Monuments of National Importance in Meghalaya
- List of State Protected Monuments in Meghalaya
- List of state protected monuments in Mizoram
- List of Monuments of National Importance in Mumbai circle
- List of Monuments of National Importance in Nagaland
- List of State Protected Monuments in Nagaland
- List of Monuments of National Importance in North Kanara district
- List of Monuments of National Importance in Odisha
- List of State Protected Monuments in Odisha
- List of Monuments of National Importance in Puducherry
- List of Monuments of National Importance in Pudukkottai district
- List of State Protected Monuments in Punjab, India
- List of Monuments of National Importance in Punjab, India
- List of Monuments of National Importance in Raichur district
- List of Monuments of National Importance in Rajasthan
- List of State Protected Monuments in Rajasthan
- List of Monuments of National Importance in Tamil Nadu
- List of State Protected Monuments in Tamil Nadu
- List of Monuments of National Importance in Telangana
- List of Monuments of National Importance in Thrissur circle
- List of Monuments of National Importance in Tripura
- List of State Protected Monuments in Tripura
- List of Monuments of National Importance in Sikkim
- List of State Protected Monuments in Sikkim
- List of Monuments of National Importance in Patna circle in Uttar Pradesh
- List of State Protected Monuments in Uttar Pradesh
- List of Monuments of National Importance in Uttarakhand
- List of State Protected Monuments in Uttarakhand
- List of Monuments of National Importance in West Bengal
- List of State Protected Monuments in West Bengal

=== Israel ===
- List of memorials and monuments at Mount Herzl

=== Japan ===
- List of Natural Monuments of Japan (Nara)
- List of Registered Monuments (Japan)
- List of Natural Monuments of Japan (Hokkaidō)
- List of Natural Monuments of Japan (Okinawa)

=== Middle East ===
- List of monuments damaged by conflict in the Middle East during the 21st century

=== Nepal ===
- List of monuments in Nepal
- List of monuments in Achham, Nepal
- List of monuments in Arghakhanchi, Nepal
- List of monuments in Baglung, Nepal
- List of monuments in Bagmati Zone
- List of monuments in Baitadi, Nepal
- List of monuments in Bajura, Nepal
- List of monuments in Bajhang, Nepal
- List of monuments in Banke, Nepal
- List of monuments in Bara, Nepal
- List of monuments in Bhaktapur, Nepal
- List of monuments in Bheri Zone
- List of monuments in Bhojpur, Nepal
- List of monuments in Chitwan, Nepal
- List of monuments in Dadeldhura, Nepal
- List of monuments in Dailekh, Nepal
- List of monuments in Dang, Nepal
- List of monuments in Darchula, Nepal
- List of monuments in Dhanusha, Nepal
- List of monuments in Dolakha, Nepal
- List of monuments in Dolpa, Nepal
- List of monuments in Doti, Nepal
- List of monuments in Dhankuta, Nepal
- List of monuments in Gandaki Zone
- List of monuments in Gulmi, Nepal
- List of monuments in Gorkha, Nepal
- List of monuments in Humla, Nepal
- List of monuments in Jajarkot, Nepal
- List of monuments in Janakpur Zone
- List of monuments in Jhapa, Nepal
- List of monuments in Jumla, Nepal
- List of monuments in Kailali, Nepal
- List of monuments in Kanchanpur, Nepal
- List of monuments in Kapilvastu, Nepal
- List of monuments in Karnali Zone
- List of monuments in Kathmandu, Nepal
- List of monuments in Hanuman Dhoka, Kathmandu
- List of monuments in Budanilkantha, Nepal
- List of monuments in Chandragiri, Nepal
- List of monuments in Dakshinkali, Nepal
- List of monuments in Kirtipur, Nepal
- List of monuments in Kageshwari Manohara, Nepal
- List of monuments in Metropolis 1, Kathmandu
- List of monuments in Metropolis 2, Kathmandu
- List of monuments in Metropolis 4, Kathmandu
- List of monuments in Metropolis 5, Kathmandu
- List of monuments in Metropolis 6, Kathmandu
- List of monuments in Metropolis 7, Kathmandu
- List of monuments in Metropolis 10, Kathmandu
- List of monuments in Metropolis 11, Kathmandu
- List of monuments in Metropolis 12, Kathmandu
- List of monuments in Metropolis 13, Kathmandu
- List of monuments in Metropolis 14, Kathmandu
- List of monuments in Metropolis 15, Kathmandu
- List of monuments in Metropolis 16, Kathmandu
- List of monuments in Metropolis 17, Kathmandu
- List of monuments in Metropolis 18, Kathmandu
- List of monuments in Metropolis 19, Kathmandu
- List of monuments in Shankharapur, Nepal
- List of monuments in Tarakeshwar, Nepal
- List of monuments in Tokha, Nepal
- List of monuments in Khotang, Nepal
- List of monuments in Kosi Zone
- List of monuments in Lalitpur, Nepal
- List of monuments in Lamjung, Nepal
- List of monuments in Ilam, Nepal
- List of monuments in Lumbini Zone
- List of monuments in Mahakali Zone
- List of monuments in Mahottari, Nepal
- List of monuments in Makwanpur, Nepal
- List of monuments in Manang, Nepal
- List of monuments in Mechi Zone
- List of monuments in Mugu, Nepal
- List of monuments in Mustang, Nepal
- List of monuments in Narayani Zone
- List of monuments in Nawalparasi, Nepal
- List of monuments in Nuwakot, Nepal
- List of monuments in Okhaldhunga, Nepal
- List of monuments in Palpa, Nepal
- List of monuments in Panchthar, Nepal
- List of monuments in Parbat, Nepal
- List of monuments in Parsa, Nepal
- List of monuments in Pyuthan, Nepal
- List of monuments in Ramechhap, Nepal
- List of monuments in Rapti Zone
- List of monuments in Rasuwa, Nepal
- List of monuments in Rautahat, Nepal
- List of monuments in Rolpa, Nepal
- List of monuments in Rupandehi, Nepal
- List of monuments in Sagarmatha Zone
- List of monuments in Salyan, Nepal
- List of monuments in Sankhuwasabha, Nepal
- List of monuments in Saptari, Nepal
- List of monuments in Sarlahi, Nepal
- List of monuments in Seti Zone
- List of monuments in Sindhuli, Nepal
- List of monuments in Siraha, Nepal
- List of monuments in Solukhumbu, Nepal
- List of monuments in Sunsari, Nepal
- List of monuments in Surkhet, Nepal
- List of monuments in Syangja, Nepal
- List of monuments in Tanahun, Nepal
- List of monuments in Taplejung, Nepal
- List of monuments in Terhathum, Nepal
- List of monuments in Udayapur, Nepal

=== North Korea ===
- Natural monuments of North Korea

=== Pakistan ===
- Cultural heritage in Pakistan (redirect from List of monuments in Pakistan)
- List of national monuments of Pakistan

=== Singapore ===
- List of national monuments of Singapore

=== South Korea ===
- Natural monuments of South Korea

=== Turkey ===
- List of natural monuments of Turkey
- List of monuments and memorials to the Kurdistan Workers' Party insurgency

== Europe ==
=== Albania ===
- Cultural Monument of Albania
- List of Religious Cultural Monuments of Albania

=== Bosnia and Herzegovina ===
- List of National Monuments of Bosnia and Herzegovina
- List of World War II monuments and memorials in Bosnia and Herzegovina

=== Czech Republic ===
- Cultural monument (Czech Republic)

=== Croatia ===
- List of Yugoslav World War II monuments and memorials in Croatia

=== Denmark ===
- List of public art in Copenhagen

=== France ===
- List of equestrian statues in France
- List of monuments historiques in Paris
- List of historic sites in Metz, France
- List of French historic monuments protected in 1840

=== Georgia ===
- List of monuments in Rustavi

=== Germany ===
- List of equestrian statues in Germany

=== Hungary ===
- List of equestrian statues in Hungary

=== Ireland ===
- National monument (Ireland)
- List of megalithic monuments in Ireland
- List of national monuments in Connacht
- List of national monuments in County Carlow
- List of national monuments in County Cavan
- List of national monuments in County Clare
- List of national monuments in County Cork
- List of national monuments in County Donegal
- List of national monuments in County Dublin
- List of national monuments in County Galway
- List of national monuments in County Kerry
- List of national monuments in County Kildare
- List of national monuments in County Kilkenny
- List of national monuments in County Laois
- List of national monuments in County Leitrim
- List of national monuments in County Limerick
- List of national monuments in County Longford
- List of national monuments in County Louth
- List of national monuments in County Mayo
- List of national monuments in County Monaghan
- List of national monuments in County Offaly
- List of national monuments in County Roscommon
- List of national monuments in County Sligo
- List of national monuments in County Tipperary
- List of national monuments in County Waterford
- List of national monuments in County Westmeath
- List of national monuments in County Wexford
- List of national monuments in County Wicklow
- List of national monuments in Leinster
- List of national monuments in Munster
- List of national monuments in Ulster
- List of monuments and memorials to the Irish Rebellion of 1798
- List of monuments and memorials to the Irish Rebellion of 1803
- List of monuments and memorials to the Fenian Rebellion

=== Italy ===
- Monuments of Italy
- List of equestrian statues in Italy
- List of buildings and structures in Como
- List of ancient monuments in Rome
- List of monuments of the Roman Forum
- List of obelisks in Rome & Statues and monuments of patriots on the Janiculum

=== Kosovo ===
- List of monuments in Prizren

=== Lithuania ===
- List of public art in Vilnius

=== Malta ===
- List of monuments in Malta
- List of monuments in Attard
- List of monuments in Balzan
- List of monuments in Birgu
- List of monuments in Birkirkara
- List of monuments in Birżebbuġa
- List of monuments in Cospicua
- List of monuments in Dingli
- List of monuments in Fgura
- List of monuments in Floriana
- List of monuments in Fontana, Gozo
- List of monuments in Għajnsielem
- List of monuments in Għarb
- List of monuments in Għasri
- List of monuments in Għaxaq
- List of monuments in Gudja
- List of monuments in Gżira
- List of monuments in Iklin
- List of monuments in Kalkara
- List of monuments in Kerċem
- List of monuments in Kirkop
- List of monuments in Lija
- List of monuments in Luqa
- List of monuments in Marsa, Malta
- List of monuments in Marsaskala
- List of monuments in Marsaxlokk
- List of monuments in Mdina
- List of monuments in Mġarr
- List of monuments in Mosta
- List of monuments in Mqabba
- List of monuments in Msida
- List of monuments in Mtarfa
- List of monuments in Munxar
- List of monuments in Nadur
- List of monuments in Naxxar
- List of monuments in Paola, Malta
- List of monuments in Pembroke, Malta
- List of monuments in Pietà, Malta
- List of monuments in Qala, Malta
- List of monuments in Qormi
- List of monuments in Qrendi
- List of monuments in Rabat, Malta
- List of monuments in Safi, Malta
- List of monuments in San Ġwann
- List of monuments in San Lawrenz
- List of monuments in Sannat
- List of monuments in Santa Venera
- List of monuments in Senglea
- List of monuments in Siġġiewi
- List of monuments in Sliema
- List of monuments in St. Julian's
- List of monuments in Tarxien
- List of monuments in Valletta
- List of monuments in Victoria, Gozo
- List of monuments in Xagħra
- List of monuments in Xewkija
- List of monuments in Żabbar
- List of monuments in Żebbuġ
- List of monuments in Żebbuġ, Gozo
- List of monuments in Żejtun
- List of monuments in Żurrieq

=== Montenegro ===
- List of Yugoslav World War II monuments and memorials in Montenegro

=== North Macedonia ===
- List of World War II monuments and memorials in North Macedonia
- List of People's Heroes of Yugoslavia monuments in North Macedonia

=== Poland ===
- List of Historic Monuments (Poland)
- List of equestrian statues in Poland

=== Portugal ===
- List of national monuments of Portugal

=== Romania ===
- List of monumente istorice in Romania
- National Register of Historic Monuments in Romania
- List of monuments in Chișinău

=== Russia ===
- List of equestrian statues in Russia
- List of monuments and memorials in Moscow
- List of monuments of Tolyatti

=== Serbia ===
- Cultural Monuments of Exceptional Importance (Serbia)
- List of People's Heroes of Yugoslavia monuments in Serbia
- List of World War II monuments and memorials in Serbia

=== Slovakia ===
- List of cultural monuments in Lučenec
- List of cultural monuments in Rimavská Sobota

=== Slovenia ===
- List of World War II monuments and memorials in Slovenia
- List of People's Heroes of Yugoslavia monuments in Slovenia

=== Spain ===
- List of equestrian statues in Spain
- List of missing landmarks in Spain

=== Switzerland ===
- Swiss Inventory of Cultural Property of National and Regional Significance
- Aargau
- Appenzell Ausserrhoden
- Appenzell Innerrhoden
- Basel-Landschaft
- Basel-Stadt
- Bern (A-M, N-Z)
- Fribourg
- Geneva
- Glarus
- Graubünden
- Jura
- Lucerne
- Neuchâtel
- Nidwalden
- Obwalden
- Schaffhausen
- Schwyz
- Solothurn
- St. Gallen
- Thurgau
- Ticino
- Uri
- Valais
- Vaud
- Zug
- Zürich

=== Ukraine ===
- List of communist monuments in Ukraine
- Demolition of monuments to Vladimir Lenin in Ukraine

=== United Kingdom ===
- List of scheduled monuments
- List of equestrian statues in the United Kingdom
- List of scheduled monuments in Bath and North East Somerset
- List of scheduled monuments in Blaenau Gwent
- Scheduled monuments in Birmingham
- List of scheduled monuments in Bridgend
- List of scheduled monuments in Caerphilly
- List of scheduled monuments in Cardiff
- Scheduled monuments in Carmarthenshire
- Scheduled monuments in Ceredigion
- List of scheduled monuments in Cheshire dated to before 1066
- List of scheduled monuments in Cheshire (1066–1539)
- List of scheduled monuments in Cheshire since 1539
- Scheduled monuments in Cornwall
- Scheduled monuments in Coventry
- Scheduled monuments and listed buildings in Exeter
- Scheduled monuments in Gwynedd
- Scheduled monuments in Leicester
- Scheduled monuments in Greater Manchester
- Scheduled monuments in Maidstone
- List of scheduled monuments in Mendip
- List of scheduled monuments in Merthyr Tydfil County Borough
- List of scheduled monuments in Monmouthshire
- List of scheduled monuments in Newport
- List of scheduled monuments in North Somerset
- Scheduled monuments in Pembrokeshire
- List of scheduled prehistoric monuments in north Pembrokeshire
- List of scheduled monuments in Rhondda Cynon Taf
- List of scheduled monuments in Sedgemoor
- List of scheduled monuments in South Somerset
- Scheduled monuments in Somerset
- List of scheduled monuments in Swansea
- List of scheduled monuments in Taunton Deane
- List of scheduled monuments in Torfaen
- List of scheduled monuments in the Vale of Glamorgan
- Lists of scheduled monuments in Wales
- Scheduled monuments in the West Midlands
- Scheduled monuments in Somerset West and Taunton

== Oceania ==
=== Australia ===
- Monuments of Australia

== Former states ==
=== Yugoslavia ===
- List of People's Heroes of Yugoslavia monuments
- World War II monuments and memorials in Yugoslavia

== Specific events ==
- List of Armenian genocide memorials
- List of Holocaust memorials and museums
- List of memorials to Bataan Death March victims
- Memorials for the COVID-19 pandemic

== Specific people ==
- List of memorials to John Adams
- List of things named for Henry Clay
- List of monuments and memorials to Christopher Columbus
- List of memorials to Jefferson Davis
- List of memorials to Dwight D. Eisenhower
- Memorials to Warren G. Harding
- List of memorials to William Henry Harrison
- List of monuments and memorials to Sam Houston
- List of memorials to Andrew Jackson
- List of monuments and memorials to Pope John Paul II
- List of memorials to Lyndon B. Johnson
- List of memorials to John F. Kennedy
- List of memorials to Robert E. Lee
- List of sculptures of Vladimir Lenin
- Memorials to Abraham Lincoln
- List of memorials to James Madison
- List of memorials to James Monroe
- List of memorials to Franklin D. Roosevelt
- Memorials to Theodore Roosevelt
- List of statues of Joseph Stalin
- List of memorials to Martin Van Buren
- List of statues of Queen Victoria
- List of memorials to George Washington
- List of monuments to Arthur Wellesley, 1st Duke of Wellington
- List of memorials to Woodrow Wilson
- List of sculptures of Ludwig van Beethoven
- List of statues of Leopold II of Belgium

== See also ==
- List of heritage registers
- List of Monuments, Fine Arts, and Archives (MFAA) personnel
- List of equestrian statues
