= List of monuments in Koshi Zone =

Kosi Zone was one of the fourteen zones of Nepal, comprising six districts, namely Bhojpur, Dhankuta, Morang, Sankhuwasabha, Sunsari and Terhathum. Here is district wise List of Monuments which is in the Kosi Zone. The Ancient Monument Protection Act 1956 has defined monuments as structure older than 100 years and having historical, cultural importance. In Koshi zone the monuments list is given below.

== Kosi Zone ==
- List of monuments in Bhojpur District
- List of monuments in Dhankuta District
- List of monuments in Morang District
- List of monuments in Sankhuwasabha District
- List of monuments in Sunsari District
- List of monuments in Terhathum District
