= List of monuments in Mechi Zone =

Mechi Zone was one of the fourteen zones of Nepal, comprising four districts, namely, Ilam, Jhapa, Panchthar, and Taplejung. The entirety of Mechi Zone has been redesignated as part of Province No. 1. There are many categorized monuments sites in Mechi zone. Here is district wise List of Monuments which is in the Mechi Zone.

== Mechi Zone ==
- List of Monuments in Ilam District
- List of Monuments in Jhapa District
- List of Monuments in Panchthar District
- List of Monuments in Taplejung District
