= List of monuments in Sagarmatha Zone =

Sagarmatha Zone was one of the fourteen zones of Nepal, comprising six districts, namely, Khotang, Okhaldhunga, Saptari, Siraha, Solukhumbu and Udayapur. Here is district wise List of Monuments which is in the Sagarmatha Zone.

== Sagarmatha Zone ==
- List of monuments in Khotang District
- List of monuments in Okhaldhunga District
- List of monuments in Saptari District
- List of monuments in Siraha District
- List of monuments in Solukhumbu District
- List of monuments in Udayapur District
