= Mehele =

- Village development committee
- Location in Nepal
- Coordinates: 27.32°N 87.71°E
- Country: Nepal
- Zone: Mechi Zone
- District: Taplejung District

Population (2011)
  - Total: 2,357
- Time zone: UTC+5:45 (Nepal Time)

Mehele is a village development committee in the Himalayas of Taplejung District in the Mechi Zone of north-eastern Nepal. At the time of the 2011 Nepal census it had a population of 2,357 people living in 463 individual households. There were 1,148 males and 1,209 females at the time of census.
