= Mechi Zone =

Coordinates: 27°10′N 87°55′E

Mechi Zone मेची अञ्चल
- Former Zone
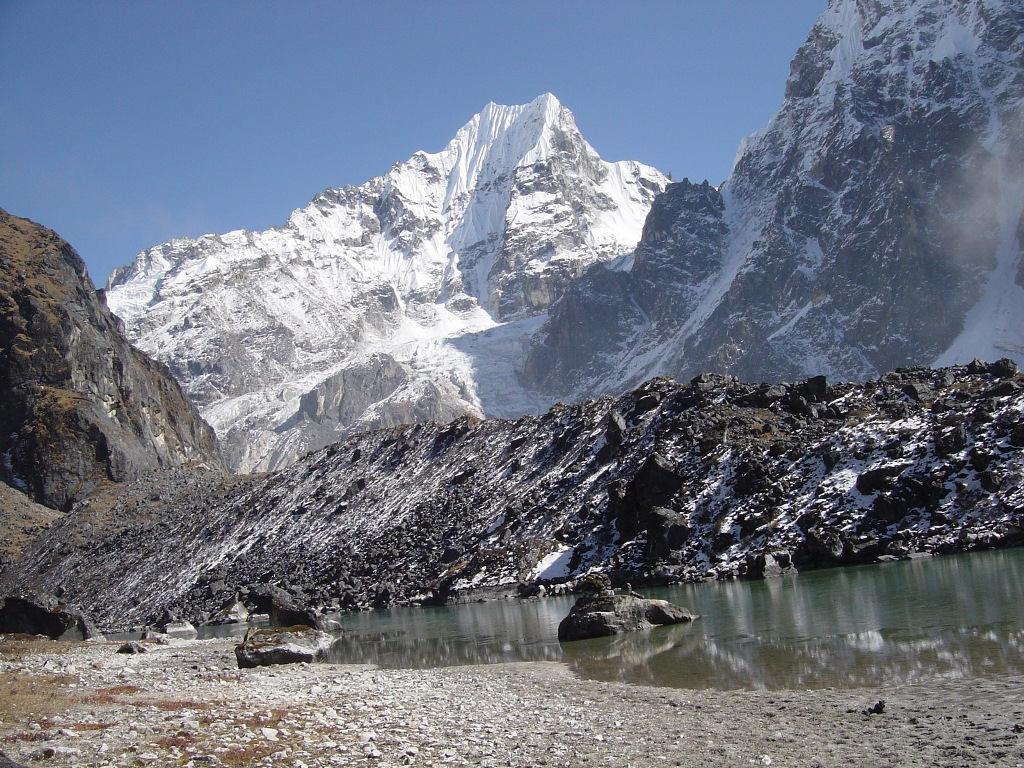
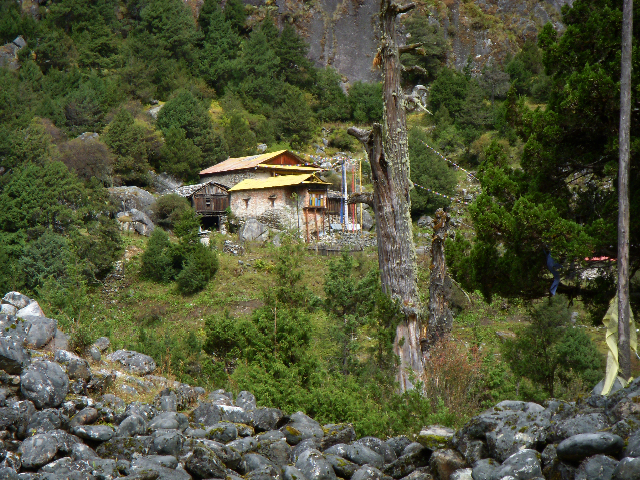
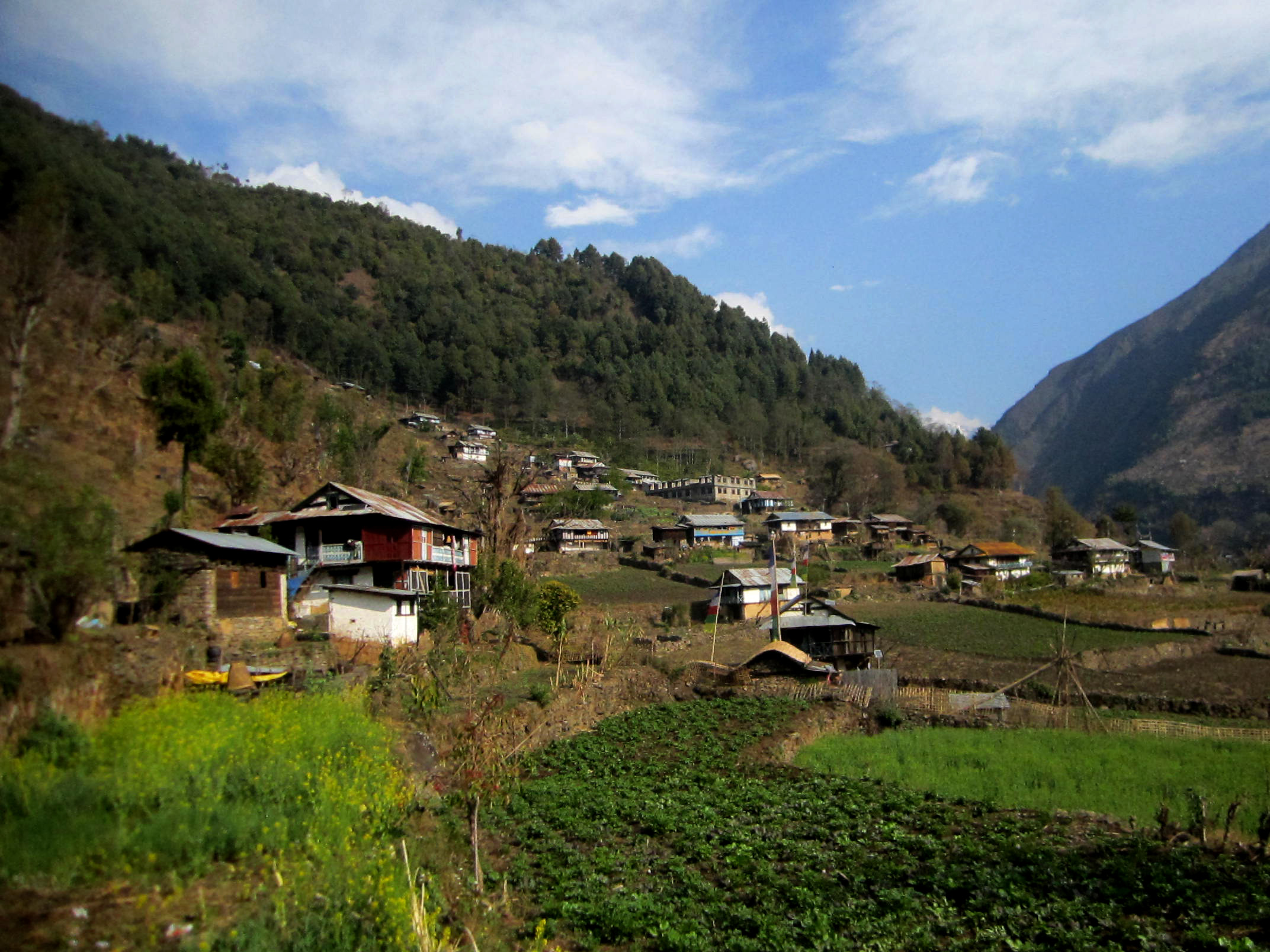
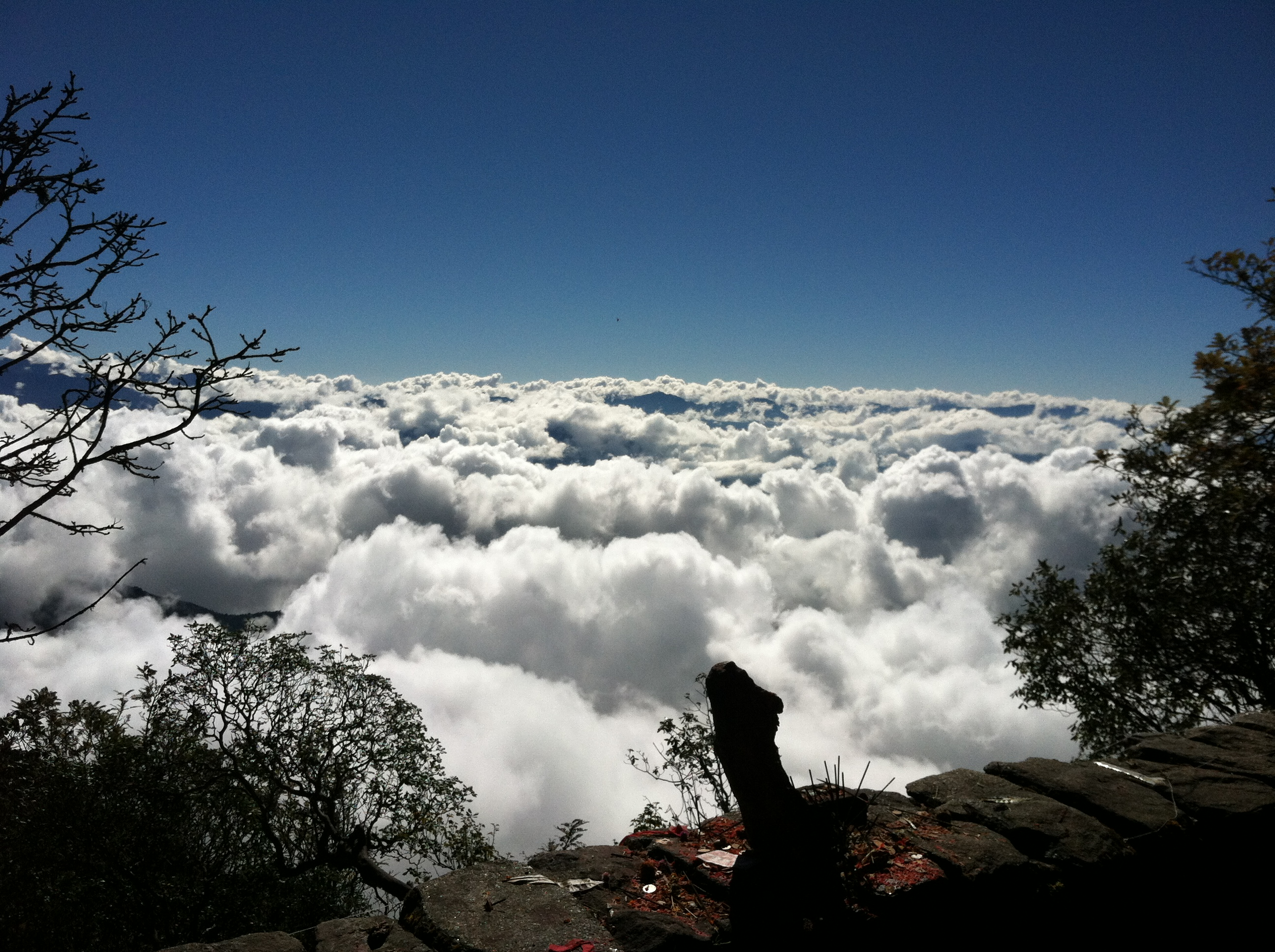
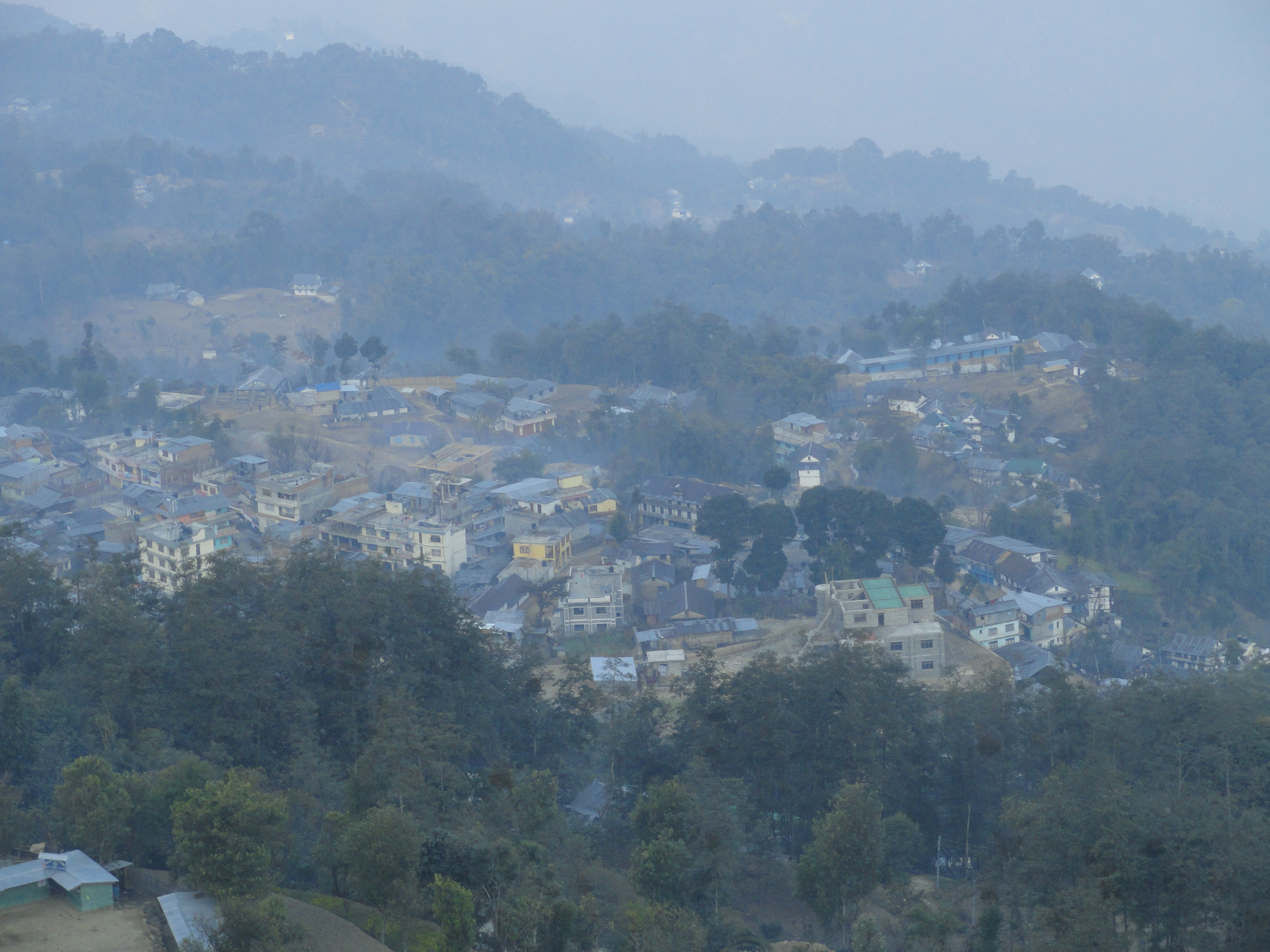
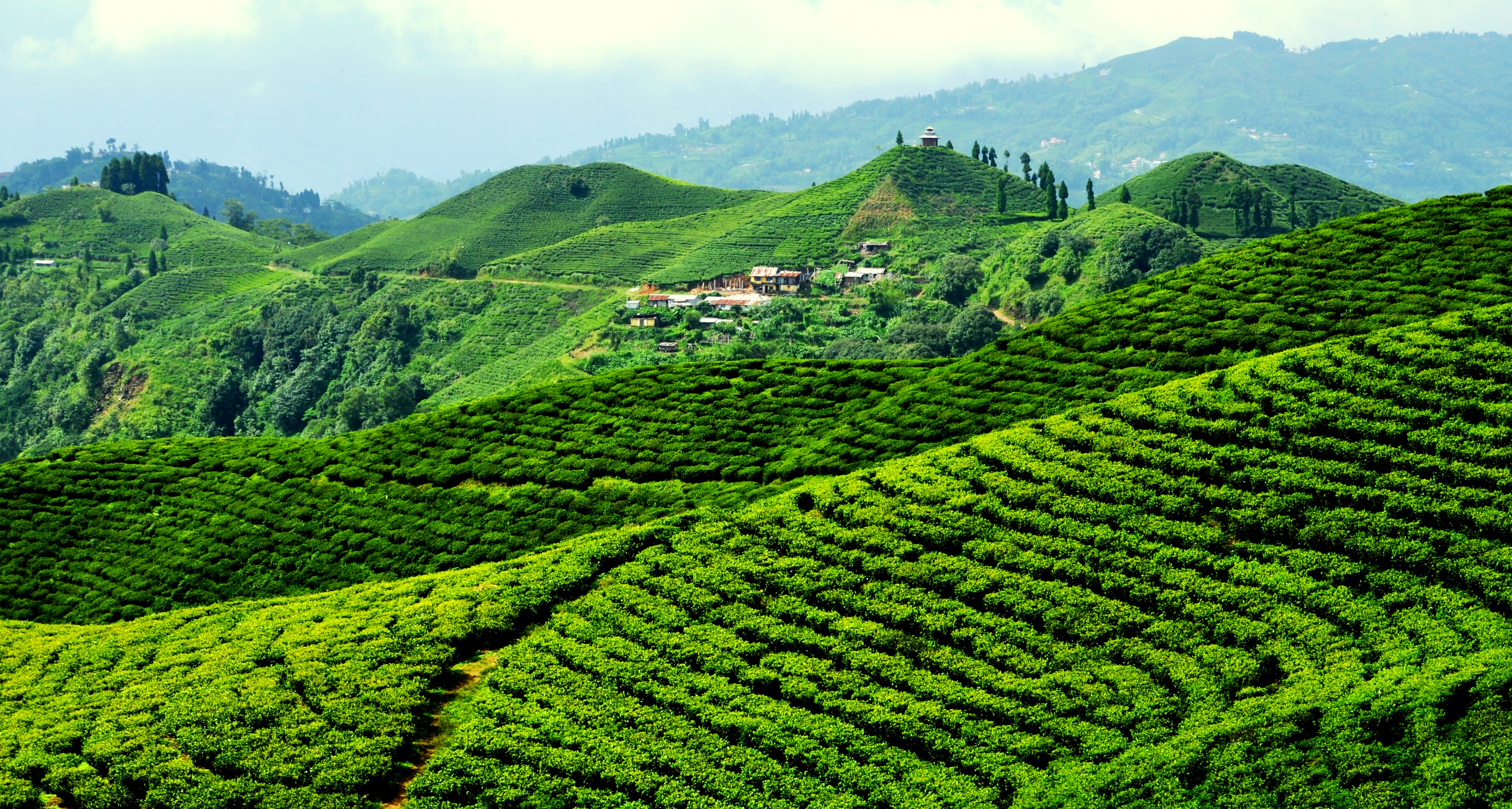
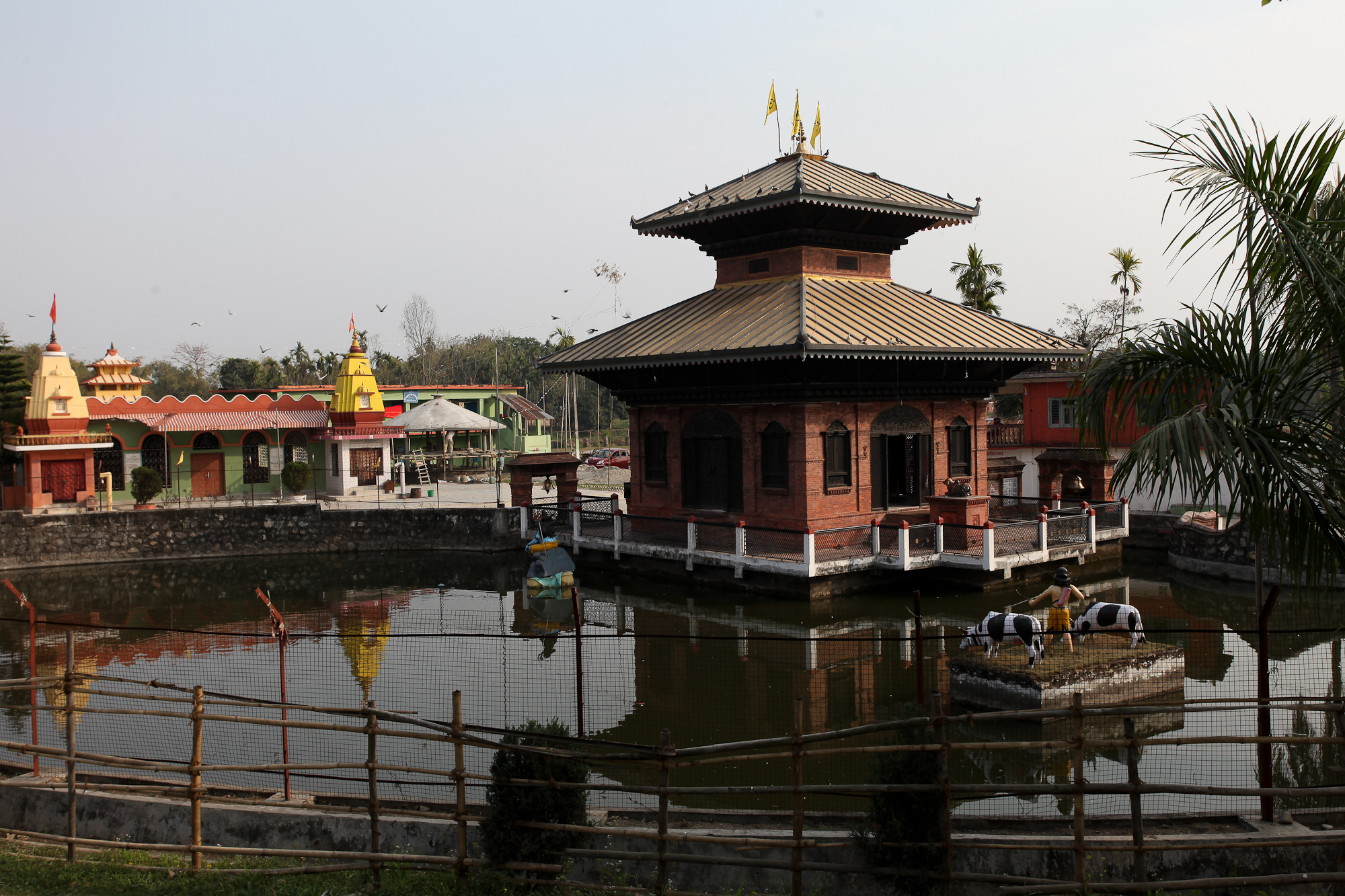
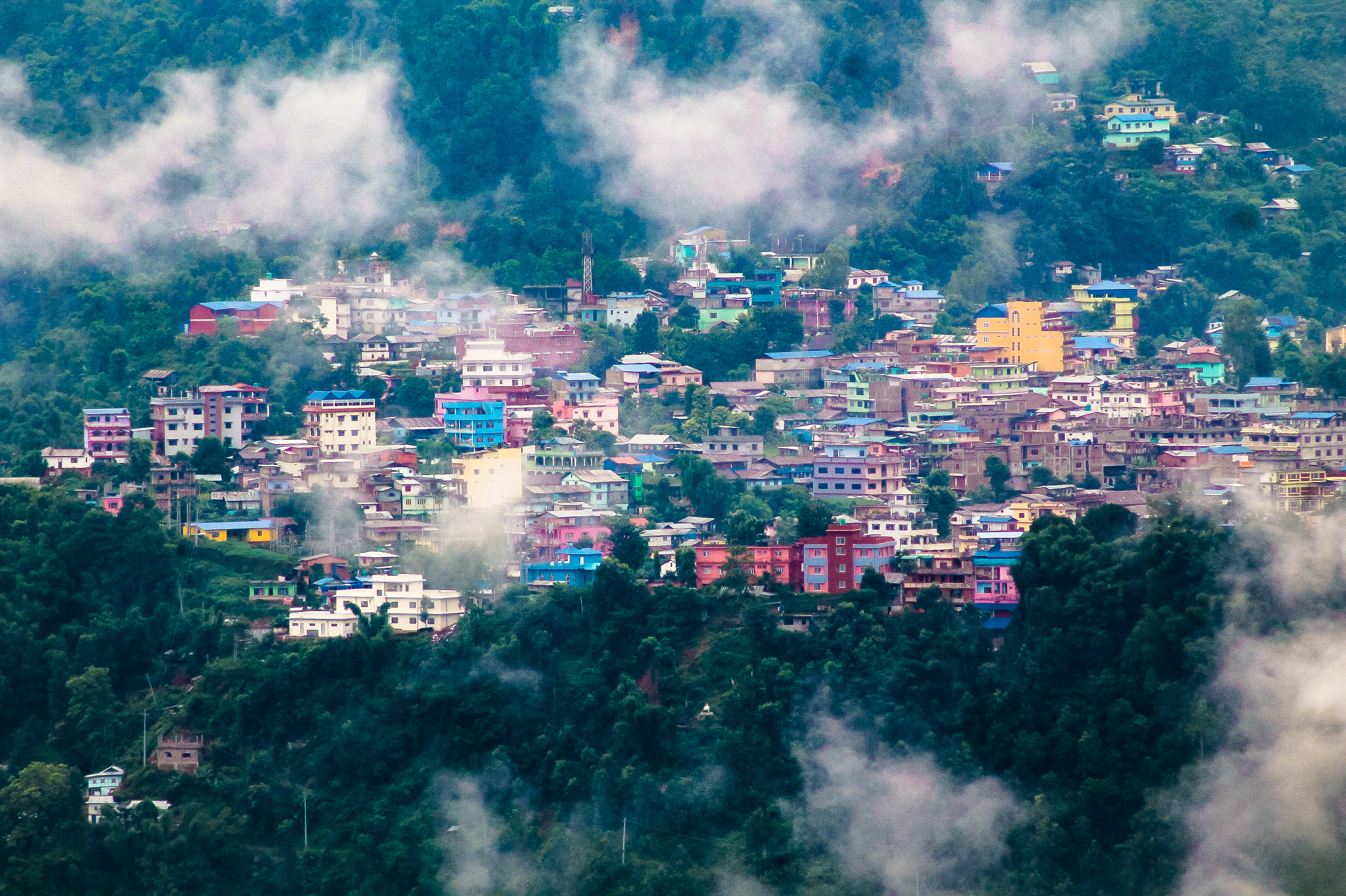
- Dudh Kunda at Yamtari Glacier, Lelep village, view from Pathibhara temple, Gunsa village (clockwise from top), Phungling bazaar, Lush Green Tea Gardens are what makes Ilam district popular., Arjundhara Dham, Phidim bazar area

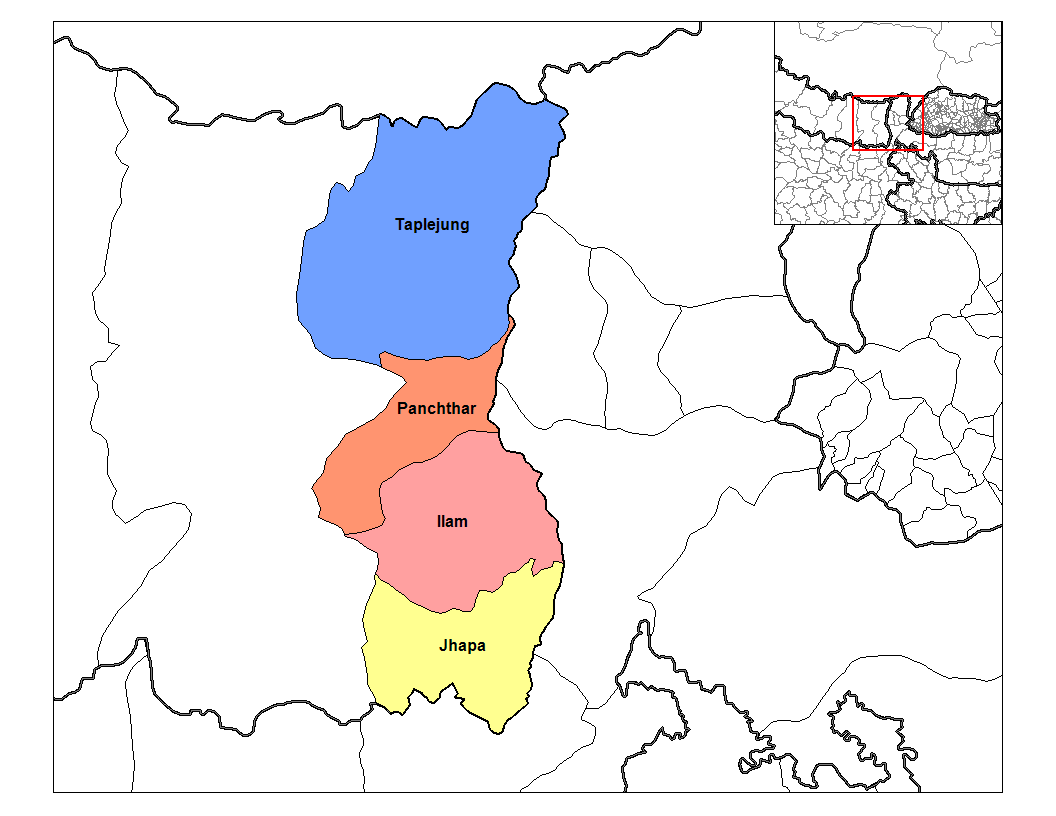
- Country: Nepal
- Named for: Mechi River
- Capital: Ilam Bazaar
- Largest city: Mechinagar
- Districts: List: Jhapa District; Ilam District; Taplejung District; Panchthar District

Area
  - Total: 8,196 km^{2} (3,164 sq mi)
- Highest elevation (Mount Kanchenjunga): 8,586 m (28,169 ft)
- Lowest elevation (Kechana Kawal): 59 m (194 ft)

Population (2011)
  - Total: 1,422,182
  - Rank: 11th
  - Density: 173.5/km^{2} (449.4/sq mi)
- Time zone: UTC+5:45 (Nepal Time)
- Main Language(s): Nepali, Rajbanshi, Surjapuri language Limbu, Maithili
- Major highways: Mahendra Highway, Postal Highway, Mechi Highway

Mechi (Nepali: मेची अञ्चल) was one of the fourteen zones of Nepal until the restructuring of zones to provinces, comprising four districts; namely Ilam, Jhapa, Panchthar and Taplejung. Its headquarters are at Ilam. It comes under the Eastern Development Region of Nepal. The Indian state of Bihar is to the south, West Bengal and Sikkim in the east and Tibet to the north. The largest town is Damak in the Terai. The majority of the population in Mechi are Limbu, Chettri, Bharmin, Maithil and Meche.

== Administrative subdivisions ==
Mechi was divided into four districts; since 2015 these districts have been redesignated as part of Province No. 1.

District	Type	Headquarters	Since 2015 part of Province
Ilam	Hill	Ilam	Province No. 1
Jhapa	Outer Terai	Bhadrapur	Province No. 1
Panchthar	Hill	Phidim	Province No. 1
Taplejung	Mountain	Taplejung	Province No. 1

Among the four districts, Jhapa is in the Terai and it is more developed than the other three districts. Ilam and Panchthar are in the hilly region. Ilam is also in a developing stage, with many tourists visiting annually. Kanyam is popular for its tea garden. At Antu the rising sun can be viewed. Taplejung is the least developed of the four districts. Taplejung is in the mountainous zone.

There are two airports within Mechi: one in Bhadrapur and one in Taplejung.

== Agriculture and industry ==
Mechi is famous for microcredit development. The Small Farmer Development Programme (SFDP) was the first rural and micro-financing program in Mechi. The Agricultural Development Bank started this SFDP in 1988. It started in a few VDCs and spread. After lifting many people out of poverty, the SFDP was handed over to the local people and the new institution was named Small Farmer Cooperative Ltd (SFCL). There are 13 SFCLs in Mechi, each of which covers a single VDC.

It is one of the major districts for the production of tea and rice. Budhabare is on the northern side of the Mahendra Highway and is one of the most fertile lands of Nepal. Mechi as a district is popular for the bittle nuts (Supari). Several large tea estate are in Mechi. Giri Bandhu Tea Estate, Burne Tea State, Tokla Tea Estate, Himalaya Tea State, Damak, Sattighatta Tea Estate are the major ones.

Mechi has different sorts of communication medium.

== Lists of Monuments ==
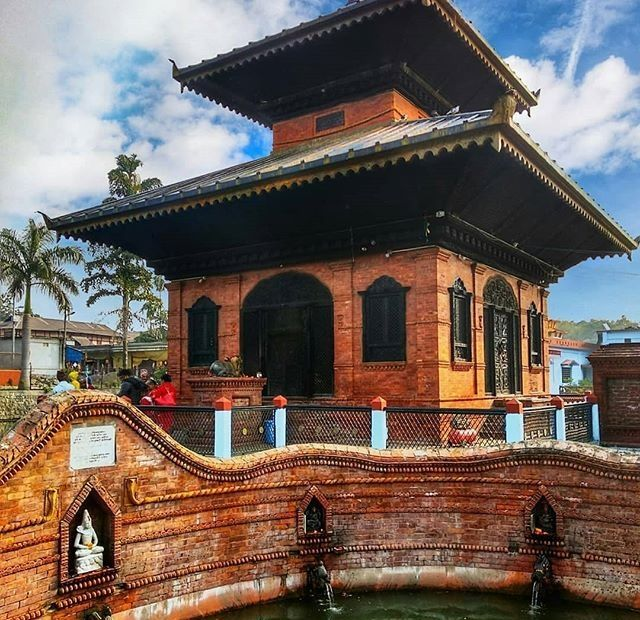
Arjundhara Temple, Jhapa District

- List of Monuments in Ilam District
- List of Monuments in Jhapa District
- List of Monuments in Panchthar District
- List of Monuments in Taplejung District

== See also ==
- Development Regions of Nepal (Former)
- List of zones of Nepal (Former)
- List of districts of Nepal
