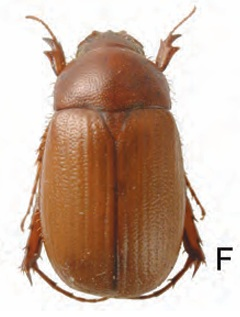

Scientific classification
- Kingdom: Animalia
- Phylum: Arthropoda
- Class: Insecta
- Order: Coleoptera
- Suborder: Polyphaga
- Infraorder: Scarabaeiformia
- Family: Scarabaeidae
- Genus: Maladera
- Species: M. mechiana

Binomial name
- Maladera mechiana Ahrens, 2004

= Maladera mechiana =

Species of beetle

Maladera mechiana is a species of beetle of the family Scarabaeidae. It is found in eastern Nepal.

== Description ==
Adults reach a length of about 6.7–7.3 mm. They have a yellowish-brown, elongate-oval body, although the pronotum is sometimes light reddish-brown. The upper surface is weakly iridescent, partly glossy and almost glabrous.

== Etymology ==
The species is named for its occurrence in the Mechi Zone.
