= List of monuments in Janakpur Zone =

Janakpur Zone was one of the fourteen zones of Nepal, comprising six districts, namely, Dhanusa, Dolakha, Mahottari, Ramechhap, Sarlahi and Sindhuli. Here is district wise List of Monuments which is in the Janakpur Zone.

== Janakpur Zone ==
- List of monuments in Dhanusha District
- List of monuments in Dolakha District
- List of monuments in Mahottari District
- List of monuments in Ramechhap District
- List of monuments in Sarlahi District
- List of monuments in Sindhuli District
