= List of monuments in Tarakeshwar, Nepal =

This is a list of monuments in Tarakeshwar Municipality within Kathmandu District, Nepal as officially recognized by and available through the website of the Department of Archaeology, Nepal. Tarakeshwar is a historically rich area and Hindu temples are the main attraction.

== List of monuments ==
ID	Name	Type	Location	District	Coordinates	Image
NP-KTMTK-01	Manamaiju Stone tap		Manamaiju, Tarakeshwar	Kathmandu		Upload Photo Upload Photo
NP-KTMTK-02	Stone tap		Manamaiju, Tarakeshwar	Kathmandu		Upload Photo Upload Photo
NP-KTMTK-03	Manmaiju Sattal		Manamaiju, Tarakeshwar	Kathmandu		Manmaiju Sattal Upload Photo
NP-KTMTK-04	Pati		Manamaiju, Tarakeshwar	Kathmandu		Upload Photo Upload Photo
NP-KTMTK-05	Pati		Manamaiju, Tarakeshwar	Kathmandu		Upload Photo Upload Photo
NP-KTMTK-06	Sattal		Manamaiju, Tarakeshwar	Kathmandu		Upload Photo Upload Photo
NP-KTMTK-07	Indrayani Temple		Manamaiju, Tarakeshwar	Kathmandu		Upload Photo Upload Photo
NP-KTMTK-08	Indrayani Temple gate		Manamaiju, Tarakeshwar	Kathmandu		Upload Photo Upload Photo
NP-KTMTK-09	Chaitya		Manamaiju, Tarakeshwar	Kathmandu		Upload Photo Upload Photo
NP-KTMTK-10	Pati		Manamaiju, Tarakeshwar	Kathmandu		Upload Photo Upload Photo
NP-KTMTK-11	Pati		Manamaiju, Tarakeshwar	Kathmandu		Upload Photo Upload Photo
NP-KTMTK-12	Dev Agamghar		Manamaiju, Tarakeshwar	Kathmandu		Dev Agamghar Upload Photo
NP-KTMTK-13	Traditional houses		Manamaiju, Tarakeshwar	Kathmandu		Upload Photo Upload Photo
NP-KTMTK-14	Pati		Manamaiju, Tarakeshwar	Kathmandu		Upload Photo Upload Photo
NP-KTMTK-15	Shivalaya		Manamaiju, Tarakeshwar	Kathmandu		Upload Photo Upload Photo
NP-KTMTK-16	Manamaiju tareswor		Manamaiju, Tarakeshwar	Kathmandu		Upload Photo Upload Photo
NP-KTMTK-17	Manamaiju Nasalchwok pati		Manamaiju, Tarakeshwar	Kathmandu		Upload Photo Upload Photo
NP-KTMTK-18	Dewasthali Mai		Kavresthali, Tarakeshwar	Kathmandu		Upload Photo Upload Photo
NP-KTMTK-19	Indraini		Kavresthali, Tarakeshwar	Kathmandu		Upload Photo Upload Photo
NP-KTMTK-20	Shape of Nine Planets		Jitpur, Tarakeshwar	Kathmandu		Upload Photo Upload Photo
NP-KTMTK-21	Saraswati Statue		Jitpur, Tarakeshwar	Kathmandu		Upload Photo Upload Photo
NP-KTMTK-22	Ganesh statue		Jitpur, Tarakeshwar	Kathmandu		Upload Photo Upload Photo
NP-KTMTK-23	Bhimsen Statue		Jitpur, Tarakeshwar	Kathmandu		Upload Photo Upload Photo
NP-KTMTK-24	Ganesh Statue Old		Jitpur, Tarakeshwar	Kathmandu		Upload Photo Upload Photo
NP-KTMTK-25	Kumari Statue		Jitpur, Tarakeshwar	Kathmandu		Upload Photo Upload Photo
NP-KTMTK-26	Stone tap		Jitpur, Tarakeshwar	Kathmandu		Upload Photo Upload Photo
NP-KTMTK-27	Nasadeu		Jitpur, Tarakeshwar	Kathmandu		Upload Photo Upload Photo
NP-KTMTK-28	Chaitya		Jitpur, Tarakeshwar	Kathmandu		Upload Photo Upload Photo
NP-KTMTK-29	Archive		Jitpur, Tarakeshwar	Kathmandu		Upload Photo Upload Photo
NP-KTMTK-30	Monuments Goods		Jitpur, Tarakeshwar	Kathmandu		Upload Photo Upload Photo
NP-KTMTK-31	Pachmane		Jitpur, Tarakeshwar	Kathmandu		Upload Photo Upload Photo
NP-KTMTK-32	Siddeshwar Temple		Jitpur, Tarakeshwar	Kathmandu		Upload Photo Upload Photo
NP-KTMTK-33	Dhungedhara		Jitpur, Tarakeshwar	Kathmandu		Upload Photo Upload Photo
NP-KTMTK-34	Guhyeswari		Goldhunga, Tarakeshwar	Kathmandu		Upload Photo Upload Photo
NP-KTMTK-35	Shivalaya		Goldhunga, Tarakeshwar	Kathmandu		Upload Photo Upload Photo
NP-KTMTK-36	Ganeshsthan		Goldhunga, Tarakeshwar	Kathmandu		Upload Photo Upload Photo
NP-KTMTK-37	Stone tap		Goldhunga, Tarakeshwar	Kathmandu		Upload Photo Upload Photo
NP-KTMTK-38	Pati		Futung, Tarakeshwar	Kathmandu		Upload Photo Upload Photo
NP-KTMTK-39	Mahalaxminarayani Temple		Futung, Tarakeshwar	Kathmandu		Mahalaxminarayani Temple Upload Photo
NP-KTMTK-40	Mahalaxmi Pati		Futung, Tarakeshwar	Kathmandu		Upload Photo Upload Photo
NP-KTMTK-41	Pati		Futung, Tarakeshwar	Kathmandu		Upload Photo Upload Photo
NP-KTMTK-42	Basudev Kamalja Idol		Futung, Tarakeshwar	Kathmandu		Upload Photo Upload Photo
NP-KTMTK-43	Bhimsennarayan Temple		Dharmasthali, Tarakeshwar	Kathmandu		Upload Photo Upload Photo
NP-KTMTK-44	Ganesh Temple		Dharmasthali, Tarakeshwar	Kathmandu		Upload Photo Upload Photo
NP-KTMTK-45	Ganesh		Dharmasthali, Tarakeshwar	Kathmandu		Upload Photo Upload Photo
NP-KTMTK-46	Sattal		Dharmasthali, Tarakeshwar	Kathmandu		Upload Photo Upload Photo
NP-KTMTK-47	Goraknath		Dharmasthali, Tarakeshwar	Kathmandu		Upload Photo Upload Photo
NP-KTMTK-48	Istadevata		Dharmasthali, Tarakeshwar	Kathmandu		Upload Photo Upload Photo
NP-KTMTK-49	Chaitya		Dharmasthali, Tarakeshwar	Kathmandu		Upload Photo Upload Photo
NP-KTMTK-50	Ganesh Temple		Dharmasthali, Tarakeshwar	Kathmandu		Upload Photo Upload Photo
NP-KTMTK-51	Saraswati		Dharmasthali, Tarakeshwar	Kathmandu		Upload Photo Upload Photo
NP-KTMTK-52	Lichhavi Archive		Dharmasthali, Tarakeshwar	Kathmandu		Upload Photo Upload Photo
NP-KTMTK-53	Ganesh pati		Dharmasthali, Tarakeshwar	Kathmandu		Upload Photo Upload Photo
NP-KTMTK-54	Chundevi Temple		Sangla, Tarakeshwar	Kathmandu		Upload Photo Upload Photo
NP-KTMTK-55	Bhimsen		Sangla, Tarakeshwar	Kathmandu		Upload Photo Upload Photo
NP-KTMTK-56	Bhairav		Sangla, Tarakeshwar	Kathmandu		Upload Photo Upload Photo
NP-KTMTK-57	Sangla Umamaheshwor		Sangla, Tarakeshwar	Kathmandu		Upload Photo Upload Photo

== See also ==
- List of monuments in Kathmandu District
- List of monuments in Nepal
