= List of monuments in Kageshwari Manohara, Nepal =

This is a list of monuments in Kageshwari-Manohara Municipality within Kathmandu District, Nepal as officially recognized by and available through the website of the Department of Archaeology, Nepal. Kageshwari-Manohara is a historically rich area and Hindu temples are the main attraction.

== List of monuments ==
ID	Name	Type	Location	District	Coordinates	Image
NP-KTMKM-01	Hitidhara		Kageshwari Manohara Municipality	Kathmandu		Upload Photo Upload Photo
NP-KTMKM-02	Hitidhara		Kageshwari Manohara Municipality	Kathmandu		Upload Photo Upload Photo
NP-KTMKM-03	Ga Hiti		Kageshwari Manohara Municipality	Kathmandu		Upload Photo Upload Photo
NP-KTMKM-04	Bhairav Sthan		Kageshwari Manohara Municipality	Kathmandu		Upload Photo Upload Photo
NP-KTMKM-05	Ganesh near bhairavsthan		Kageshwari Manohara Municipality	Kathmandu		Upload Photo Upload Photo
NP-KTMKM-06	Dharmastambha bhajan pati		Kageshwari Manohara Municipality	Kathmandu		Upload Photo Upload Photo
NP-KTMKM-07	Naipali Hiti		Kageshwari Manohara Municipality	Kathmandu		Upload Photo Upload Photo
NP-KTMKM-08	Dahichiura Pati		Kageshwari Manohara Municipality	Kathmandu		Upload Photo Upload Photo
NP-KTMKM-09	Ichot Stone tap		Kageshwari Manohara Municipality	Kathmandu		Upload Photo Upload Photo
NP-KTMKM-10	Shivasharma Mahadev		Kageshwari Manohara Municipality	Kathmandu		Upload Photo Upload Photo
NP-KTMKM-11	Stone tap		Kageshwari Manohara Municipality	Kathmandu		Upload Photo Upload Photo
NP-KTMKM-12	Gouronath Mahadev		Kageshwari Manohara Municipality	Kathmandu		Upload Photo Upload Photo
NP-KTMKM-13	Gaurinath Mahadev		Kageshwari Manohara Municipality	Kathmandu		Upload Photo Upload Photo
NP-KTMKM-14	Stone Inscription		Kageshwari Manohara Municipality	Kathmandu		Upload Photo Upload Photo
NP-KTMKM-15	Mahadevsthan Pati		Kageshwari Manohara Municipality	Kathmandu		Upload Photo Upload Photo
NP-KTMKM-16	Tejvinayak		Kageshwari Manohara Municipality	Kathmandu		Upload Photo Upload Photo
NP-KTMKM-17	Stone Tap		Kageshwari Manohara Municipality	Kathmandu		Upload Photo Upload Photo
NP-KTMKM-18	Stone Tap		Kageshwari Manohara Municipality	Kathmandu		Upload Photo Upload Photo
NP-KTMKM-19	Thapagaon Pati		Kageshwari Manohara Municipality	Kathmandu		Upload Photo Upload Photo
NP-KTMKM-20	mahankal Bhairav Temple		Kageshwari Manohara Municipality	Kathmandu		Upload Photo Upload Photo
NP-KTMKM-21	mahankal Bhairav Temple		Kageshwari Manohara Municipality	Kathmandu		Upload Photo Upload Photo
NP-KTMKM-22	Shivalaya		Kageshwari Manohara Municipality	Kathmandu		Upload Photo Upload Photo
NP-KTMKM-23	Kageshwor		Kageshwari Manohara Municipality	Kathmandu		Upload Photo Upload Photo
NP-KTMKM-24	Ganesh		Kageshwari Manohara Municipality	Kathmandu		Upload Photo Upload Photo
NP-KTMKM-25	Kartikeya Kumar		Kageshwari Manohara Municipality	Kathmandu		Upload Photo Upload Photo
NP-KTMKM-26	Kageshwor		Kageshwari Manohara Municipality	Kathmandu		Upload Photo Upload Photo
NP-KTMKM-27	Shivalinga		Kageshwari Manohara Municipality	Kathmandu		Upload Photo Upload Photo
NP-KTMKM-28	Goth & stone pati		Kageshwari Manohara Municipality	Kathmandu		Upload Photo Upload Photo

== See also ==
- List of monuments in Kathmandu District
- List of monuments in Nepal
