= List of monuments in Shankharapur, Nepal =

This is a list of monuments in Shankharapur Municipality within Kathmandu District, Nepal as officially recognized by and available through the website of the Department of Archaeology, Nepal. Shankharapur is a historically rich area and Hindu temples are the main attraction.

== List of monuments ==
ID	Name	Type	Location	District	Coordinates	Image
NP-KTMSP-01	Bhimsen		Bajrayogini, Shankharapur	Kathmandu		Bhimsen Upload Photo
NP-KTMSP-02	Krishna Statue		Bajrayogini, Shankharapur	Kathmandu		Upload Photo Upload Photo
NP-KTMSP-03	Jyotilingeshwor Mahadev		Bajrayogini, Shankharapur	Kathmandu		Jyotilingeshwor Mahadev Upload Photo
NP-KTMSP-04	Shivalinga inside Jyotilingeshwor Mahadev		Bajrayogini, Shankharapur	Kathmandu		Shivalinga inside Jyotilingeshwor Mahadev Upload Photo
NP-KTMSP-05	Entrance gate of Jyotilingeshwor		Bajrayogini, Shankharapur	Kathmandu		Upload Photo Upload Photo
NP-KTMSP-06	Jyotilingeshwor Hiti tap		Bajrayogini, Shankharapur	Kathmandu		Upload Photo Upload Photo
NP-KTMSP-07	Shivalinga		Bajrayogini, Shankharapur	Kathmandu		Shivalinga Upload Photo
NP-KTMSP-08	Devisthan Navadurga		Bajrayogini, Shankharapur	Kathmandu		Upload Photo Upload Photo
NP-KTMSP-09	Lakeshwor		Bajrayogini, Shankharapur	Kathmandu		Upload Photo Upload Photo
NP-KTMSP-10	Narayan Murthi		Bajrayogini, Shankharapur	Kathmandu		Upload Photo Upload Photo
NP-KTMSP-11	Ganesh Idol		Bajrayogini, Shankharapur	Kathmandu		Ganesh Idol Upload Photo
NP-KTMSP-12	Saraswati Idol		Bajrayogini, Shankharapur	Kathmandu		Saraswati Idol Upload Photo
NP-KTMSP-13	Jalasayan Narayan		Bajrayogini, Shankharapur	Kathmandu		Jalasayan Narayan Upload Photo
NP-KTMSP-14	Shiva Parbati Temple		Bajrayogini, Shankharapur	Kathmandu		Shiva Parbati Temple Upload Photo
NP-KTMSP-15	Uma maheshwor		Bajrayogini, Shankharapur	Kathmandu		Upload Photo Upload Photo
NP-KTMSP-16	Pati		Bajrayogini, Shankharapur	Kathmandu		Upload Photo Upload Photo
NP-KTMSP-17	Devotee		Bajrayogini, Shankharapur	Kathmandu		Upload Photo Upload Photo
NP-KTMSP-18	Shivalaya		Bajrayogini, Shankharapur	Kathmandu		Shivalaya Upload Photo
NP-KTMSP-19	Makhan Falaicha		Bajrayogini, Shankharapur	Kathmandu		Upload Photo Upload Photo
NP-KTMSP-20	Nasadya		Bajrayogini, Shankharapur	Kathmandu		Upload Photo Upload Photo
NP-KTMSP-21	Makhan hiti		Bajrayogini, Shankharapur	Kathmandu		Upload Photo Upload Photo
NP-KTMSP-22	Sthanak Bishnu		Bajrayogini, Shankharapur	Kathmandu		Upload Photo Upload Photo
NP-KTMSP-23	Bishweshwor Mahadev		Bajrayogini, Shankharapur	Kathmandu		Upload Photo Upload Photo
NP-KTMSP-24	Chhatra chandeshwor		Bajrayogini, Shankharapur	Kathmandu		Upload Photo Upload Photo
NP-KTMSP-25	Ganesh		Bajrayogini, Shankharapur	Kathmandu		Upload Photo Upload Photo
NP-KTMSP-26	Wafal Pati		Bajrayogini, Shankharapur	Kathmandu		Upload Photo Upload Photo
NP-KTMSP-27	Bishnu at Bafal Pati		Bajrayogini, Shankharapur	Kathmandu		Upload Photo Upload Photo
NP-KTMSP-28	Hanuman Statue		Bajrayogini, Shankharapur	Kathmandu		Upload Photo Upload Photo
NP-KTMSP-29	Bishnu		Bajrayogini, Shankharapur	Kathmandu		Upload Photo Upload Photo
NP-KTMSP-30	Bishnu		Bajrayogini, Shankharapur	Kathmandu		Upload Photo Upload Photo
NP-KTMSP-31	Krishna Temple and Dabali		Bajrayogini, Shankharapur	Kathmandu		Upload Photo Upload Photo
NP-KTMSP-32	Stone Inscription		Bajrayogini, Shankharapur	Kathmandu		Upload Photo Upload Photo
NP-KTMSP-33	Hitidhara		Bajrayogini, Shankharapur	Kathmandu		Upload Photo Upload Photo
NP-KTMSP-34	Chaitya		Bajrayogini, Shankharapur	Kathmandu		Upload Photo Upload Photo
NP-KTMSP-35	Shivalinga		Bajrayogini, Shankharapur	Kathmandu		Upload Photo Upload Photo
NP-KTMSP-36	Ganesh Temple		Bajrayogini, Shankharapur	Kathmandu		Upload Photo Upload Photo
NP-KTMSP-37	Krishna Temple		Bajrayogini, Shankharapur	Kathmandu		Upload Photo Upload Photo
NP-KTMSP-38	Bishnu Temple		Bajrayogini, Shankharapur	Kathmandu		Upload Photo Upload Photo
NP-KTMSP-39	Ganesh Temple		Bajrayogini, Shankharapur	Kathmandu		Upload Photo Upload Photo
NP-KTMSP-40	Bhairavsthan		Bajrayogini, Shankharapur	Kathmandu		Upload Photo Upload Photo
NP-KTMSP-41	Dhing Sattal		Bajrayogini, Shankharapur	Kathmandu		Upload Photo Upload Photo
NP-KTMSP-42	Narayan Temple		Bajrayogini, Shankharapur	Kathmandu		Upload Photo Upload Photo
NP-KTMSP-43	Jaldroni		Bajrayogini, Shankharapur	Kathmandu		Upload Photo Upload Photo
NP-KTMSP-44	Chaitya		Bajrayogini, Shankharapur	Kathmandu		Upload Photo Upload Photo
NP-KTMSP-45	Shridhar		Bajrayogini, Shankharapur	Kathmandu		Upload Photo Upload Photo
NP-KTMSP-46	Pati		Bajrayogini, Shankharapur	Kathmandu		Upload Photo Upload Photo
NP-KTMSP-47	Dabali		Bajrayogini, Shankharapur	Kathmandu		Upload Photo Upload Photo
NP-KTMSP-48	Dyol Falcha		Bajrayogini, Shankharapur	Kathmandu		Upload Photo Upload Photo
NP-KTMSP-49	Krishnadewal Hitidhara		Bajrayogini, Shankharapur	Kathmandu		Upload Photo Upload Photo
NP-KTMSP-50	Narwadeshwor Mahadev		Bajrayogini, Shankharapur	Kathmandu		Upload Photo Upload Photo
NP-KTMSP-51	Narbadeshwor Shivlinga		Bajrayogini, Shankharapur	Kathmandu		Upload Photo Upload Photo
NP-KTMSP-52	Narbadeshwor Kuti		Bajrayogini, Shankharapur	Kathmandu		Upload Photo Upload Photo
NP-KTMSP-53	Dhlapupati		Bajrayogini, Shankharapur	Kathmandu		Upload Photo Upload Photo
NP-KTMSP-54	Bhimsensthan		Bajrayogini, Shankharapur	Kathmandu		Upload Photo Upload Photo
NP-KTMSP-55	Gods at bhimsensthan		Bajrayogini, Shankharapur	Kathmandu		Upload Photo Upload Photo
NP-KTMSP-56	Nasadya		Bajrayogini, Shankharapur	Kathmandu		Upload Photo Upload Photo
NP-KTMSP-57	Open gods at bhimsen sthan		Bajrayogini, Shankharapur	Kathmandu		Upload Photo Upload Photo
NP-KTMSP-58	Bhairab		Bajrayogini, Shankharapur	Kathmandu		Upload Photo Upload Photo
NP-KTMSP-59	Uma maheshwor		Bajrayogini, Shankharapur	Kathmandu		Upload Photo Upload Photo
NP-KTMSP-60	Ganesh		Bajrayogini, Shankharapur	Kathmandu		Upload Photo Upload Photo
NP-KTMSP-61	Bhairav		Bajrayogini, Shankharapur	Kathmandu		Upload Photo Upload Photo
NP-KTMSP-62	Ramsita		Bajrayogini, Shankharapur	Kathmandu		Upload Photo Upload Photo
NP-KTMSP-63	Shivalinga		Bajrayogini, Shankharapur	Kathmandu		Upload Photo Upload Photo
NP-KTMSP-64	Hanuman Statue		Bajrayogini, Shankharapur	Kathmandu		Upload Photo Upload Photo
NP-KTMSP-65	Pati of Rana period		Bajrayogini, Shankharapur	Kathmandu		Upload Photo Upload Photo
NP-KTMSP-66	Bishnu		Bajrayogini, Shankharapur	Kathmandu		Upload Photo Upload Photo
NP-KTMSP-67	Ganesh Temple		Bajrayogini, Shankharapur	Kathmandu		Upload Photo Upload Photo
NP-KTMSP-68	Chandrawati Stone		Bajrayogini, Shankharapur	Kathmandu		Chandrawati Stone Upload Photo
NP-KTMSP-69	Chandrawati thach		Bajrayogini, Shankharapur	Kathmandu		Chandrawati thach Upload Photo
NP-KTMSP-70	Dole Bhole		Bajrayogini, Shankharapur	Kathmandu		Upload Photo Upload Photo
NP-KTMSP-71	Madhavnarayan Pati		Bajrayogini, Shankharapur	Kathmandu		Upload Photo Upload Photo
NP-KTMSP-72	Krishnadewal		Bajrayogini, Shankharapur	Kathmandu		Upload Photo Upload Photo
NP-KTMSP-73	Mahabishnu		Bajrayogini, Shankharapur	Kathmandu		Upload Photo Upload Photo
NP-KTMSP-74	Mahalaxmi Temple		Bajrayogini, Shankharapur	Kathmandu		Upload Photo Upload Photo
NP-KTMSP-75	Nhyak sattal		Bajrayogini, Shankharapur	Kathmandu		Upload Photo Upload Photo
NP-KTMSP-76	Ganesh Temple		Bajrayogini, Shankharapur	Kathmandu		Upload Photo Upload Photo
NP-KTMSP-77	Shiva at Ganesh Temple		Bajrayogini, Shankharapur	Kathmandu		Upload Photo Upload Photo
NP-KTMSP-78	Bajrayogini Temple		Bajrayogini, Shankharapur	Kathmandu		Bajrayogini Temple Upload Photo
NP-KTMSP-79	Main Entrance of Bajrayogini		Bajrayogini, Shankharapur	Kathmandu		Upload Photo Upload Photo
NP-KTMSP-80	Saraswati Temple		Bajrayogini, Shankharapur	Kathmandu		Upload Photo Upload Photo
NP-KTMSP-81	Adhi Budha		Bajrayogini, Shankharapur	Kathmandu		Upload Photo Upload Photo
NP-KTMSP-82	Adhi Budha with Makarakriti hitidhara		Bajrayogini, Shankharapur	Kathmandu		Upload Photo Upload Photo
NP-KTMSP-83	Uma Maheshwor & Adi Buddha		Bajrayogini, Shankharapur	Kathmandu		Upload Photo Upload Photo
NP-KTMSP-84	Maha sukkha Majusattal		Bajrayogini, Shankharapur	Kathmandu		Upload Photo Upload Photo
NP-KTMSP-85	Makarakrith hitidhara ra Jaldroni		Bajrayogini, Shankharapur	Kathmandu		Upload Photo Upload Photo
NP-KTMSP-86	Shashakti Ganesh		Bajrayogini, Shankharapur	Kathmandu		Upload Photo Upload Photo
NP-KTMSP-87	Uddheswik chaitya		Bajrayogini, Shankharapur	Kathmandu		Upload Photo Upload Photo
NP-KTMSP-88	Chaughera Sattal		Bajrayogini, Shankharapur	Kathmandu		Upload Photo Upload Photo
NP-KTMSP-89	Daxinkali Bhairav		Bajrayogini, Shankharapur	Kathmandu		Upload Photo Upload Photo
NP-KTMSP-90	New statue of Daxinkali Bhairav		Bajrayogini, Shankharapur	Kathmandu		Upload Photo Upload Photo
NP-KTMSP-91	Ganesh		Bajrayogini, Shankharapur	Kathmandu		Upload Photo Upload Photo
NP-KTMSP-92	Jaladroni		Bajrayogini, Shankharapur	Kathmandu		Upload Photo Upload Photo
NP-KTMSP-93	Bhairav		Bajrayogini, Shankharapur	Kathmandu		Upload Photo Upload Photo
NP-KTMSP-94	Old statue of Daxinkali		Bajrayogini, Shankharapur	Kathmandu		Upload Photo Upload Photo
NP-KTMSP-95	Sukhha sattal		Bajrayogini, Shankharapur	Kathmandu		Upload Photo Upload Photo
NP-KTMSP-96	Stone tap		Bajrayogini, Shankharapur	Kathmandu		Stone tap Upload Photo
NP-KTMSP-97	Pati		Bajrayogini, Shankharapur	Kathmandu		Upload Photo Upload Photo
NP-KTMSP-98	Bhajan Ghar Sattal		Bajrayogini, Shankharapur	Kathmandu		Upload Photo Upload Photo
NP-KTMSP-99	Tindha ra pati		Bajrayogini, Shankharapur	Kathmandu		Upload Photo Upload Photo
NP-KTMSP-100	Pati at Bajrayogini premise		Bajrayogini, Shankharapur	Kathmandu		Upload Photo Upload Photo
NP-KTMSP-101	Stone age cave		Bajrayogini, Shankharapur	Kathmandu		Upload Photo Upload Photo
NP-KTMSP-102	Kumari Temple		Indraini, Shankharapur	Kathmandu		Upload Photo Upload Photo
NP-KTMSP-103	Ganesh Temple		Indraini, Shankharapur	Kathmandu		Upload Photo Upload Photo
NP-KTMSP-104	Nateshwor Pati		Indraini, Shankharapur	Kathmandu		Upload Photo Upload Photo
NP-KTMSP-105	Indraini Temple		Indraini, Shankharapur	Kathmandu		Upload Photo Upload Photo
NP-KTMSP-106	Indraini Pati		Indraini, Shankharapur	Kathmandu		Upload Photo Upload Photo
NP-KTMSP-107	Indraini ddhochhe		Indraini, Shankharapur	Kathmandu		Upload Photo Upload Photo
NP-KTMSP-108	Indraini Sattal		Indraini, Shankharapur	Kathmandu		Upload Photo Upload Photo
NP-KTMSP-109	Indrayani Sattal Stone inscription		Indraini, Shankharapur	Kathmandu		Upload Photo Upload Photo
NP-KTMSP-110	Satidevi Bhairavsthan		Indraini, Shankharapur	Kathmandu		Upload Photo Upload Photo
NP-KTMSP-111	Khumaltar Stone tap		Indraini, Shankharapur	Kathmandu		Upload Photo Upload Photo
NP-KTMSP-112	Jarsing Pauwa		Lapsiphedi, Shankharapur	Kathmandu		Upload Photo Upload Photo
NP-KTMSP-113	Baghdhara		Lapsiphedi, Shankharapur	Kathmandu		Upload Photo Upload Photo
NP-KTMSP-114	Stone Tap		Lapsiphedi, Shankharapur	Kathmandu		Upload Photo Upload Photo
NP-KTMSP-115	Ganesh Temple		Nanglebhare, Shankharapur	Kathmandu		Upload Photo Upload Photo
NP-KTMSP-116	Ganesh Temple		Nanglebhare, Shankharapur	Kathmandu		Upload Photo Upload Photo
NP-KTMSP-117	Pati		Pukhalachi, Shankharapur	Kathmandu		Upload Photo Upload Photo
NP-KTMSP-118	Chaitya		Pukhalachi, Shankharapur	Kathmandu		Upload Photo Upload Photo
NP-KTMSP-119	Singha Sattal		Pukhalachi, Shankharapur	Kathmandu		Upload Photo Upload Photo
NP-KTMSP-120	Hiti Dhara		Pukhalachi, Shankharapur	Kathmandu		Upload Photo Upload Photo
NP-KTMSP-121	Stone Tap		Pukhalachi, ShankharapurBajraYogini	Kathmandu		Upload Photo Upload Photo
NP-KTMSP-122	Sthanak Bishnu		Pukhalachi, ShankharapurBajraYogini	Kathmandu		Upload Photo Upload Photo
NP-KTMSP-123	Nasal Devata		Pukhalachi, Shankharapur	Kathmandu		Upload Photo Upload Photo
NP-KTMSP-124	Chaitya		Pukhalachi, Shankharapur	Kathmandu		Upload Photo Upload Photo
NP-KTMSP-125	Pati		Pukhalachi, Shankharapur	Kathmandu		Upload Photo Upload Photo
NP-KTMSP-126	Pati		Pukhalachi, Shankharapur	Kathmandu		Upload Photo Upload Photo
NP-KTMSP-127	Saraswati Temple		Pukhalachi, Shankharapur	Kathmandu		Upload Photo Upload Photo
NP-KTMSP-128	Dhullan Ganesh Sattal		Pukhalachi, Shankharapur	Kathmandu		Upload Photo Upload Photo
NP-KTMSP-129	Shiva Parbati		Pukhalachi, Shankharapur	Kathmandu		Upload Photo Upload Photo
NP-KTMSP-130	Chaitya		Pukhalachi, Shankharapur	Kathmandu		Upload Photo Upload Photo
NP-KTMSP-131	Nha Sattal		Pukhalachi, Shankharapur	Kathmandu		Upload Photo Upload Photo
NP-KTMSP-132	Narayan Temple		Pukhalachi, Shankharapur	Kathmandu		Upload Photo Upload Photo
NP-KTMSP-133	Narayan Satue of Narayan Temple		Pukhalachi, Shankharapur	Kathmandu		Upload Photo Upload Photo
NP-KTMSP-134	Pati		Pukhalachi, Shankharapur	Kathmandu		Upload Photo Upload Photo
NP-KTMSP-135	Madhav Narayan and Sattal		Pukhalachi, Shankharapur	Kathmandu		Upload Photo Upload Photo
NP-KTMSP-136	Madhev inside the Sattal		Pukhalachi, Shankharapur	Kathmandu		Upload Photo Upload Photo
NP-KTMSP-137	Udshyik Chaitya		Pukhalachi, Shankharapur	Kathmandu		Upload Photo Upload Photo
NP-KTMSP-138	Udshyik Chaitya		Pukhalachi, Shankharapur	Kathmandu		Upload Photo Upload Photo
NP-KTMSP-139	Udshyik Chaitya		Pukhalachi, Shankharapur	Kathmandu		Upload Photo Upload Photo
NP-KTMSP-140	Udshyik Chaitya		Pukhalachi, Shankharapur	Kathmandu		Upload Photo Upload Photo
NP-KTMSP-141	Layak		Pukhalachi, Shankharapur	Kathmandu		Upload Photo Upload Photo
NP-KTMSP-142	Bhimsen Temple		Pukhalachi, Shankharapur	Kathmandu		Upload Photo Upload Photo
NP-KTMSP-143	Draupadi and Bhimsen		Pukhalachi, Shankharapur	Kathmandu		Upload Photo Upload Photo
NP-KTMSP-144	Ganesh		Pukhalachi, Shankharapur	Kathmandu		Upload Photo Upload Photo
NP-KTMSP-145	Harilingeshwor		Pukhalachi, Shankharapur	Kathmandu		Upload Photo Upload Photo
NP-KTMSP-146	Harilingeshwor		Pukhalachi, Shankharapur	Kathmandu		Upload Photo Upload Photo
NP-KTMSP-147	Shiva		Pukhalachi, Shankharapur	Kathmandu		Upload Photo Upload Photo
NP-KTMSP-148	Pukhulachhi		Pukhalachi, Shankharapur	Kathmandu		Upload Photo Upload Photo
NP-KTMSP-149	Layaku		Pukhalachi, Shankharapur	Kathmandu		Upload Photo Upload Photo
NP-KTMSP-150	Dabali		Pukhalachi, Shankharapur	Kathmandu		Upload Photo Upload Photo
NP-KTMSP-151	Ardhanareshwor		Pukhalachi, Shankharapur	Kathmandu		Upload Photo Upload Photo
NP-KTMSP-152	Ganesh Temple		Pukhalachi, Shankharapur	Kathmandu		Upload Photo Upload Photo
NP-KTMSP-153	Ganesh Temple		Pukhalachi, Shankharapur	Kathmandu		Upload Photo Upload Photo
NP-KTMSP-154	Sadawarta Pati		Pukhalachi, Shankharapur	Kathmandu		Upload Photo Upload Photo
NP-KTMSP-155	Ardhanareshwor		Pukhalachi, Shankharapur	Kathmandu		Upload Photo Upload Photo
NP-KTMSP-156	Ardhanareshwor		Pukhalachi, Shankharapur	Kathmandu		Upload Photo Upload Photo
NP-KTMSP-157	Taha Falcha		Pukhalachi, Shankharapur	Kathmandu		Upload Photo Upload Photo
NP-KTMSP-158	Pati		Pukhalachi, Shankharapur	Kathmandu		Upload Photo Upload Photo
NP-KTMSP-159	Yalmajol Hiti		Pukhalachi, Shankharapur	Kathmandu		Upload Photo Upload Photo
NP-KTMSP-160	Ganesh dewal		Pukhalachi, Shankharapur	Kathmandu		Upload Photo Upload Photo
NP-KTMSP-161	Bhagawati		Pukhalachi, Shankharapur	Kathmandu		Upload Photo Upload Photo
NP-KTMSP-162	Bhagawati pati		Pukhalachi, Shankharapur	Kathmandu		Upload Photo Upload Photo
NP-KTMSP-163	Narayan Temple		Suntol, Shankharapur	Kathmandu		Upload Photo Upload Photo
NP-KTMSP-164	God inside the Narayan Temple		Suntol, Shankharapur	Kathmandu		Upload Photo Upload Photo
NP-KTMSP-165	Sasakti Vairab		Suntol, Shankharapur	Kathmandu		Upload Photo Upload Photo
NP-KTMSP-166	Pati		Suntol, Shankharapur	Kathmandu		Upload Photo Upload Photo
NP-KTMSP-167	Hiti Dhara		Suntol, Shankharapur	Kathmandu		Upload Photo Upload Photo
NP-KTMSP-168	Ganesh Temple		Suntol, Shankharapur	Kathmandu		Upload Photo Upload Photo
NP-KTMSP-169	Uma Maheshwor		Suntol, Shankharapur	Kathmandu		Upload Photo Upload Photo
NP-KTMSP-170	Shiva Parwati		Suntol, Shankharapur	Kathmandu		Upload Photo Upload Photo
NP-KTMSP-171	Pati		Suntol, Shankharapur	Kathmandu		Upload Photo Upload Photo
NP-KTMSP-172	Hiti Dhara		Suntol, Shankharapur	Kathmandu		Upload Photo Upload Photo
NP-KTMSP-173	Bhairav Pati		Suntol, Shankharapur	Kathmandu		Upload Photo Upload Photo
NP-KTMSP-174	Jayabali Bhairav		Suntol, Shankharapur	Kathmandu		Upload Photo Upload Photo
NP-KTMSP-175	Dabali of Bajrayogini		Suntol, Shankharapur	Kathmandu		Upload Photo Upload Photo
NP-KTMSP-176	Pati		Suntol, Shankharapur	Kathmandu		Upload Photo Upload Photo
NP-KTMSP-177	Ganesh Pati		Suntol, Shankharapur	Kathmandu		Upload Photo Upload Photo
NP-KTMSP-178	Ganesh		Suntol, Shankharapur	Kathmandu		Upload Photo Upload Photo
NP-KTMSP-179	Dugahiti		Suntol, Shankharapur	Kathmandu		Upload Photo Upload Photo
NP-KTMSP-180	Umamaheshwor		Suntol, Shankharapur	Kathmandu		Upload Photo Upload Photo

== See also ==
- List of monuments in Kathmandu District
- List of monuments in Nepal
