= List of monuments in Budanilkantha, Nepal =

This is a list of monuments in Budhanilkantha Municipality within Kathmandu District, Nepal as officially recognized by and available through the website of the Department of Archaeology, Nepal. Budhanilkantha is a historically rich area and Hindu temples are the main attraction of this municipality.

== List of monuments ==
ID	Name	Type	Location	District	Coordinates	Image
NP-KTMBK-01	Budhanilkantha Narayan		Budhanilakantha Municipality	Kathmandu		Budhanilkantha Narayan Upload Photo
NP-KTMBK-02	Stone Inscription		Budhanilakantha Municipality	Kathmandu		Stone Inscription Upload Photo
NP-KTMBK-03	Stone Inscription		Budhanilakantha Municipality	Kathmandu		Upload Photo Upload Photo
NP-KTMBK-04	Stone Inscription		Budhanilakantha Municipality	Kathmandu		Upload Photo Upload Photo
NP-KTMBK-05	Archive		Budhanilakantha Municipality	Kathmandu		Upload Photo Upload Photo
NP-KTMBK-06	Bairinag		Budhanilakantha Municipality	Kathmandu		Bairinag Upload Photo
NP-KTMBK-07	Saraswati		Budhanilakantha Municipality	Kathmandu		Saraswati Upload Photo
NP-KTMBK-08	Ugrarup shiva		Budhanilakantha Municipality	Kathmandu		Upload Photo Upload Photo
NP-KTMBK-09	Bhimsen		Budhanilakantha Municipality	Kathmandu		Bhimsen Upload Photo
NP-KTMBK-10	Laxmi		Budhanilakantha Municipality	Kathmandu		Upload Photo Upload Photo
NP-KTMBK-11	Yogi idol		Budhanilakantha Municipality	Kathmandu		Upload Photo Upload Photo
NP-KTMBK-12	Nari idol		Budhanilakantha Municipality	Kathmandu		Upload Photo Upload Photo
NP-KTMBK-13	baraha		Budhanilakantha Municipality	Kathmandu		Upload Photo Upload Photo
NP-KTMBK-14	Devotee		Budhanilakantha Municipality	Kathmandu		Upload Photo Upload Photo
NP-KTMBK-15	shinghabahin		Budhanilakantha Municipality	Kathmandu		Upload Photo Upload Photo
NP-KTMBK-16	Devotee		Budhanilakantha Municipality	Kathmandu		Upload Photo Upload Photo
NP-KTMBK-17	Stone Inscription		Budhanilakantha Municipality	Kathmandu		Upload Photo Upload Photo
NP-KTMBK-18	Laxmi		Budhanilakantha Municipality	Kathmandu		Upload Photo Upload Photo
NP-KTMBK-19	Bhakta		Budhanilakantha Municipality	Kathmandu		Upload Photo Upload Photo
NP-KTMBK-20	Nari idol		Budhanilakantha Municipality	Kathmandu		Upload Photo Upload Photo
NP-KTMBK-21	Yogi idol		Budhanilakantha Municipality	Kathmandu		Upload Photo Upload Photo
NP-KTMBK-22	Nari idol		Budhanilakantha Municipality	Kathmandu		Upload Photo Upload Photo
NP-KTMBK-23	Yogi idol		Budhanilakantha Municipality	Kathmandu		Upload Photo Upload Photo
NP-KTMBK-24	Devotee		Budhanilakantha Municipality	Kathmandu		Upload Photo Upload Photo
NP-KTMBK-25	Devotee		Budhanilakantha Municipality	Kathmandu		Upload Photo Upload Photo
NP-KTMBK-26	Devotee		Budhanilakantha Municipality	Kathmandu		Upload Photo Upload Photo
NP-KTMBK-27	Devotee		Budhanilakantha Municipality	Kathmandu		Upload Photo Upload Photo
NP-KTMBK-28	Devotee		Budhanilakantha Municipality	Kathmandu		Upload Photo Upload Photo
NP-KTMBK-29	Shivalinga		Budhanilakantha Municipality	Kathmandu		Shivalinga Upload Photo
NP-KTMBK-30	Bishnu Laxmi		Budhanilakantha Municipality	Kathmandu		Upload Photo Upload Photo
NP-KTMBK-31	Bishnu Laxmi		Budhanilakantha Municipality	Kathmandu		Upload Photo Upload Photo
NP-KTMBK-32	Umamaheshwor		Budhanilakantha Municipality	Kathmandu		Umamaheshwor Upload Photo
NP-KTMBK-33	Garudasan Bishnu		Budhanilakantha Municipality	Kathmandu		Garudasan Bishnu Upload Photo
NP-KTMBK-34	Umamaheshwor		Budhanilakantha Municipality	Kathmandu		Upload Photo Upload Photo
NP-KTMBK-35	Ganesh		Budhanilakantha Municipality	Kathmandu		Ganesh Upload Photo
NP-KTMBK-36	Stone Inscription		Budhanilakantha Municipality	Kathmandu		Upload Photo Upload Photo
NP-KTMBK-37	Chaitya		Budhanilakantha Municipality	Kathmandu		Chaitya Upload Photo
NP-KTMBK-38	Umamaheshwor		Budhanilakantha Municipality	Kathmandu		Upload Photo Upload Photo
NP-KTMBK-39	Nrityaswar Mahadev		Budhanilakantha Municipality	Kathmandu		Upload Photo Upload Photo
NP-KTMBK-40	Chaturbahu		Budhanilakantha Municipality	Kathmandu		Upload Photo Upload Photo
NP-KTMBK-41	Panchakanya		Budhanilakantha Municipality	Kathmandu		Panchakanya Upload Photo
NP-KTMBK-42	Shivalinga		Budhanilakantha Municipality	Kathmandu		Upload Photo Upload Photo
NP-KTMBK-43	Chaturnarayan		Budhanilakantha Municipality	Kathmandu		Upload Photo Upload Photo
NP-KTMBK-44	Shiva parwati		Budhanilakantha Municipality	Kathmandu		Upload Photo Upload Photo
NP-KTMBK-45	Nakeshwor Mahadev		Budhanilakantha Municipality	Kathmandu		Upload Photo Upload Photo
NP-KTMBK-46	Stone Tap		Budhanilakantha Municipality	Kathmandu		Stone Tap Upload Photo
NP-KTMBK-47	Bull		Budhanilakantha Municipality	Kathmandu		Bull Upload Photo
NP-KTMBK-48	Hanuman		Budhanilakantha Municipality	Kathmandu		Hanuman Upload Photo
NP-KTMBK-49	Devotee		Budhanilakantha Municipality	Kathmandu		Upload Photo Upload Photo
NP-KTMBK-50	Shivalinga		Budhanilakantha Municipality	Kathmandu		Shivalinga Upload Photo

== See also ==
- List of monuments in Kathmandu District
- List of monuments in Nepal
