= List of monuments in Morang, Nepal =

This is a list of monuments in Morang District, Nepal as officially recognized by and available through the website of the Department of Archaeology, Nepal. Morang is a district of Province No. 1 and is located in eastern Nepal.

== List of monuments ==
ID	Name	Type	Location	District	Coordinates	Image
NP-MOR-01	Birat King Palace			Morang		Upload Photo Upload Photo
NP-MOR-02	King Dhanpal Palace			Morang		Upload Photo Upload Photo
NP-MOR-03	Birat Temple			Morang		Upload Photo Upload Photo
NP-MOR-04	Mahadev Temple			Morang		Upload Photo Upload Photo

== See also ==
- List of monuments in Province No. 1
- List of monuments in Nepal
