= List of monuments in Chandragiri, Nepal =

This is a list of monuments in Chandragiri Municipality within Kathmandu District, Nepal as officially recognized by and available through the website of the Department of Archaeology, Nepal. Chandragiri is a historically rich area and Hindu temples are the main attraction of this municipality.

== List of monuments ==
ID	Name	Type	Location	District	Coordinates	Image
NP-KTMCG-01	Mahalaxmi Temple		Chandragiri Municipality	Kathmandu		Upload Photo Upload Photo
NP-KTMCG-02	Sasadyou		Chandragiri Municipality	Kathmandu		Upload Photo Upload Photo
NP-KTMCG-03	Mahalaxmi Deu Che		Chandragiri Municipality	Kathmandu		Upload Photo Upload Photo
NP-KTMCG-04	Pati		Chandragiri Municipality	Kathmandu		Upload Photo Upload Photo
NP-KTMCG-05	Toran		Chandragiri Municipality	Kathmandu		Upload Photo Upload Photo
NP-KTMCG-06	Mahalaxmi deu Toran		Chandragiri Municipality	Kathmandu		Upload Photo Upload Photo
NP-KTMCG-07	Lion at Mahalaxmi gate		Chandragiri Municipality	Kathmandu		Upload Photo Upload Photo
NP-KTMCG-08	Lion at Mahalaxmi gate		Chandragiri Municipality	Kathmandu		Upload Photo Upload Photo
NP-KTMCG-09	Toran of Mahalaxmi south gate		Chandragiri Municipality	Kathmandu		Upload Photo Upload Photo
NP-KTMCG-10	Nasadeu main gate lion		Chandragiri Municipality	Kathmandu		Upload Photo Upload Photo
NP-KTMCG-11	Archive in Malalaxmi deu		Chandragiri Municipality	Kathmandu		Upload Photo Upload Photo
NP-KTMCG-12	Newari Archive in Mahalaxmi deu		Chandragiri Municipality	Kathmandu		Upload Photo Upload Photo
NP-KTMCG-13	Gatekeeper statue of Mahalaxmi deu		Chandragiri Municipality	Kathmandu		Upload Photo Upload Photo
NP-KTMCG-14	Gatekeeper statue of Mahalaxmi deu		Chandragiri Municipality	Kathmandu		Upload Photo Upload Photo
NP-KTMCG-15	Statue at Mahalaxmi deu		Chandragiri Municipality	Kathmandu		Upload Photo Upload Photo
NP-KTMCG-16	Archive		Chandragiri Municipality	Kathmandu		Upload Photo Upload Photo
NP-KTMCG-17	Krisnha Temple		Chandragiri Municipality	Kathmandu		Upload Photo Upload Photo
NP-KTMCG-18	Krishna Gopini Statue		Chandragiri Municipality	Kathmandu		Upload Photo Upload Photo
NP-KTMCG-19	Bishnudevi & Linga figure		Chandragiri Municipality	Kathmandu		Upload Photo Upload Photo
NP-KTMCG-20	Bishnu face pillar		Chandragiri Municipality	Kathmandu		Upload Photo Upload Photo
NP-KTMCG-21	Jaldhari		Chandragiri Municipality	Kathmandu		Upload Photo Upload Photo
NP-KTMCG-22	Pond		Chandragiri Municipality	Kathmandu		Upload Photo Upload Photo
NP-KTMCG-23	Surya statue		Chandragiri Municipality	Kathmandu		Upload Photo Upload Photo
NP-KTMCG-24	Uma Maheshwor		Chandragiri Municipality	Kathmandu		Upload Photo Upload Photo
NP-KTMCG-25	Archive of Mohan Shumsher		Chandragiri Municipality	Kathmandu		Upload Photo Upload Photo
NP-KTMCG-26	Mahankal Idol		Chandragiri Municipality	Kathmandu		Upload Photo Upload Photo
NP-KTMCG-27	Mahankal Idol		Chandragiri Municipality	Kathmandu		Upload Photo Upload Photo
NP-KTMCG-28	Bajraganesh		Chandragiri Municipality	Kathmandu		Upload Photo Upload Photo
NP-KTMCG-29	Ganesh statue		Chandragiri Municipality	Kathmandu		Upload Photo Upload Photo
NP-KTMCG-30	Lion		Chandragiri Municipality	Kathmandu		Upload Photo Upload Photo
NP-KTMCG-31	Shridhar Bishnu		Chandragiri Municipality	Kathmandu		Upload Photo Upload Photo
NP-KTMCG-32	Shreedhar		Chandragiri Municipality	Kathmandu		Upload Photo Upload Photo
NP-KTMCG-33	Dathu falcha		Chandragiri Municipality	Kathmandu		Upload Photo Upload Photo
NP-KTMCG-34	Chiwa		Chandragiri Municipality	Kathmandu		Upload Photo Upload Photo
NP-KTMCG-35	Chaitya		Chandragiri Municipality	Kathmandu		Upload Photo Upload Photo
NP-KTMCG-36	Lokeshwor idol		Chandragiri Municipality	Kathmandu		Upload Photo Upload Photo
NP-KTMCG-37	Manjushree Idol		Chandragiri Municipality	Kathmandu		Upload Photo Upload Photo
NP-KTMCG-38	Achyomya buddha		Chandragiri Municipality	Kathmandu		Upload Photo Upload Photo
NP-KTMCG-39	Lokeshwor idol		Chandragiri Municipality	Kathmandu		Upload Photo Upload Photo
NP-KTMCG-40	Bishnu Statue		Chandragiri Municipality	Kathmandu		Upload Photo Upload Photo
NP-KTMCG-41	Temple with Bishnu statue		Chandragiri Municipality	Kathmandu		Upload Photo Upload Photo
NP-KTMCG-42	Pati		Chandragiri Municipality	Kathmandu		Upload Photo Upload Photo
NP-KTMCG-43	Tulasa Mut		Chandragiri Municipality	Kathmandu		Upload Photo Upload Photo
NP-KTMCG-44	Fattshwar Temple		Chandragiri Municipality	Kathmandu		Upload Photo Upload Photo
NP-KTMCG-45	Fatteshwar Shivalinga		Chandragiri Municipality	Kathmandu		Upload Photo Upload Photo
NP-KTMCG-46	Bull		Chandragiri Municipality	Kathmandu		Upload Photo Upload Photo
NP-KTMCG-47	Chink Falchha		Chandragiri Municipality	Kathmandu		Upload Photo Upload Photo
NP-KTMCG-48	Archive		Chandragiri Municipality	Kathmandu		Upload Photo Upload Photo
NP-KTMCG-49	Buddha		Chandragiri Municipality	Kathmandu		Upload Photo Upload Photo
NP-KTMCG-50	Likeshwor Temple		Chandragiri Municipality	Kathmandu		Upload Photo Upload Photo
NP-KTMCG-51	Lokeshwor idol		Chandragiri Municipality	Kathmandu		Upload Photo Upload Photo
NP-KTMCG-52	Kumari Temple		Chandragiri Municipality	Kathmandu		Upload Photo Upload Photo
NP-KTMCG-53	South Entrance		Chandragiri Municipality	Kathmandu		Upload Photo Upload Photo
NP-KTMCG-54	Archive		Chandragiri Municipality	Kathmandu		Upload Photo Upload Photo
NP-KTMCG-55	Archive		Chandragiri Municipality	Kathmandu		Upload Photo Upload Photo
NP-KTMCG-56	Chatya		Chandragiri Municipality	Kathmandu		Upload Photo Upload Photo
NP-KTMCG-57	Chaitya		Chandragiri Municipality	Kathmandu		Upload Photo Upload Photo
NP-KTMCG-58	Archive		Chandragiri Municipality	Kathmandu		Upload Photo Upload Photo
NP-KTMCG-59	Lokhagcha		Chandragiri Municipality	Kathmandu		Upload Photo Upload Photo
NP-KTMCG-60	Shivalinga		Chandragiri Municipality	Kathmandu		Upload Photo Upload Photo
NP-KTMCG-61	North Entrance		Chandragiri Municipality	Kathmandu		Upload Photo Upload Photo
NP-KTMCG-62	Mahalaxmi Temple		Chandragiri Municipality	Kathmandu		Upload Photo Upload Photo
NP-KTMCG-63	Mahalaxmi Temple Inside		Chandragiri Municipality	Kathmandu		Upload Photo Upload Photo
NP-KTMCG-64	Singha		Chandragiri Municipality	Kathmandu		Upload Photo Upload Photo
NP-KTMCG-65	Singha		Chandragiri Municipality	Kathmandu		Upload Photo Upload Photo
NP-KTMCG-66	Archive		Chandragiri Municipality	Kathmandu		Upload Photo Upload Photo
NP-KTMCG-67	Pati		Chandragiri Municipality	Kathmandu		Upload Photo Upload Photo
NP-KTMCG-68	Pati		Chandragiri Municipality	Kathmandu		Upload Photo Upload Photo
NP-KTMCG-69	Bishnu Idol		Chandragiri Municipality	Kathmandu		Upload Photo Upload Photo
NP-KTMCG-70	Archive		Chandragiri Municipality	Kathmandu		Upload Photo Upload Photo
NP-KTMCG-71	Archive		Chandragiri Municipality	Kathmandu		Upload Photo Upload Photo
NP-KTMCG-72	Shaktipith		Chandragiri Municipality	Kathmandu		Upload Photo Upload Photo
NP-KTMCG-73	Shaktipith		Chandragiri Municipality	Kathmandu		Upload Photo Upload Photo
NP-KTMCG-74	Pati		Chandragiri Municipality	Kathmandu		Upload Photo Upload Photo
NP-KTMCG-75	Ganesh Temple		Chandragiri Municipality	Kathmandu		Upload Photo Upload Photo
NP-KTMCG-76	Ganesh		Chandragiri Municipality	Kathmandu		Upload Photo Upload Photo
NP-KTMCG-77	Bijayaram Vihar		Chandragiri Municipality	Kathmandu		Upload Photo Upload Photo
NP-KTMCG-78	Chaitya		Chandragiri Municipality	Kathmandu		Upload Photo Upload Photo
NP-KTMCG-79	East Gate		Chandragiri Municipality 4	Kathmandu		Upload Photo Upload Photo
NP-KTMCG-80	AluGh		Chandragiri Municipality 5	Kathmandu		Upload Photo Upload Photo
NP-KTMCG-81	Parnidhipurna Mahavihar		Chandragiri Municipality	Kathmandu		Upload Photo Upload Photo
NP-KTMCG-82	Gautama Buddha		Chandragiri Municipality	Kathmandu		Upload Photo Upload Photo
NP-KTMCG-83	Kassap Buddha		Chandragiri Municipality	Kathmandu		Upload Photo Upload Photo
NP-KTMCG-84	Kongaman Buddha		Chandragiri Municipality	Kathmandu		Upload Photo Upload Photo
NP-KTMCG-85	Krakuchhanda Buddha		Chandragiri Municipality	Kathmandu		Upload Photo Upload Photo
NP-KTMCG-86	Bessav Buddha		Chandragiri Municipality	Kathmandu		Upload Photo Upload Photo
NP-KTMCG-87	Sikhi Buddha		Chandragiri Municipality	Kathmandu		Upload Photo Upload Photo
NP-KTMCG-88	Bipassi Buddha		Chandragiri Municipality	Kathmandu		Upload Photo Upload Photo
NP-KTMCG-89	Phussa Buddha		Chandragiri Municipality	Kathmandu		Upload Photo Upload Photo
NP-KTMCG-90	Tiss Buddha		Chandragiri Municipality	Kathmandu		Upload Photo Upload Photo
NP-KTMCG-91	Siddhartha Buddha		Chandragiri Municipality	Kathmandu		Upload Photo Upload Photo
NP-KTMCG-92	Atthdassi Buddha		Chandragiri Municipality	Kathmandu		Upload Photo Upload Photo
NP-KTMCG-93	Sitashi Buddha		Chandragiri Municipality	Kathmandu		Upload Photo Upload Photo
NP-KTMCG-94	Sujata Buddha		Chandragiri Municipality	Kathmandu		Upload Photo Upload Photo
NP-KTMCG-95	Sumodh Buddha		Chandragiri Municipality	Kathmandu		Upload Photo Upload Photo
NP-KTMCG-96	Padmattar Buddha		Chandragiri Municipality	Kathmandu		Upload Photo Upload Photo
NP-KTMCG-97	Sobhit Buddha		Chandragiri Municipality	Kathmandu		Upload Photo Upload Photo
NP-KTMCG-98	Rabat Buddha		Chandragiri Municipality	Kathmandu		Upload Photo Upload Photo
NP-KTMCG-99	Suman Buddha		Chandragiri Municipality	Kathmandu		Upload Photo Upload Photo
NP-KTMCG-100	Mangal Buddha		Chandragiri Municipality	Kathmandu		Upload Photo Upload Photo
NP-KTMCG-101	Kongaman Buddha		Chandragiri Municipality	Kathmandu		Upload Photo Upload Photo
NP-KTMCG-102	Dipankar Buddha		Chandragiri Municipality	Kathmandu		Upload Photo Upload Photo
NP-KTMCG-103	Saranankar Buddha		Chandragiri Municipality	Kathmandu		Upload Photo Upload Photo
NP-KTMCG-104	Medhkar Buddha		Chandragiri Municipality	Kathmandu		Upload Photo Upload Photo
NP-KTMCG-105	Tandkar Buddha		Chandragiri Municipality	Kathmandu		Upload Photo Upload Photo
NP-KTMCG-106	Machhenarayan Temple		Machhenarayan, Chandragiri	Kathmandu		Machhenarayan Temple Upload Photo
NP-KTMCG-107	Machhenarayan Idol		Machhenarayan, Chandragiri	Kathmandu		Upload Photo Upload Photo
NP-KTMCG-108	Machhenarayan Shivalinga		Machhenarayan, Chandragiri	Kathmandu		Machhenarayan Shivalinga Upload Photo
NP-KTMCG-109	Chaitya		Machhenarayan, Chandragiri	Kathmandu		Upload Photo Upload Photo
NP-KTMCG-110	Uma maheshwor		Machhenarayan, Chandragiri	Kathmandu		Upload Photo Upload Photo
NP-KTMCG-111	Taps		Machhenarayan, Chandragiri	Kathmandu		Upload Photo Upload Photo
NP-KTMCG-112	Pati		Machhenarayan, Chandragiri	Kathmandu		Pati Upload Photo
NP-KTMCG-113	Panchhate Ganeshthan		Machhenarayan, Chandragiri	Kathmandu		Upload Photo Upload Photo
NP-KTMCG-114	Sattal		Machhenarayan, Chandragiri	Kathmandu		Upload Photo Upload Photo
NP-KTMCG-115	Pati		Machhenarayan, Chandragiri	Kathmandu		Upload Photo Upload Photo
NP-KTMCG-116	Ganesj Deval		Machhenarayan, Chandragiri	Kathmandu		Ganesj Deval Upload Photo
NP-KTMCG-117	Vishnudevi Temple		Machhenarayan, Chandragiri	Kathmandu		Upload Photo Upload Photo
NP-KTMCG-118	Pati		Machhenarayan, Chandragiri	Kathmandu		Upload Photo Upload Photo
NP-KTMCG-119	Pati Samnneka Chaitya		Machhenarayan, Chandragiri	Kathmandu		Upload Photo Upload Photo
NP-KTMCG-120	Ganeshstan		Machhenarayan, Chandragiri	Kathmandu		Upload Photo Upload Photo
NP-KTMCG-121	Khula Murtiharu		Machhenarayan, Chandragiri	Kathmandu		Upload Photo Upload Photo
NP-KTMCG-122	Open Archive under peepal tree		Machhenarayan, Chandragiri	Kathmandu		Upload Photo Upload Photo
NP-KTMCG-123	Badrinarayan Temple		Thankot, Chandragiri	Kathmandu		Upload Photo Upload Photo
NP-KTMCG-124	Laxminarayan		Thankot, Chandragiri	Kathmandu		Upload Photo Upload Photo
NP-KTMCG-125	Statue inside Badrinarayan		Thankot, Chandragiri	Kathmandu		Upload Photo Upload Photo
NP-KTMCG-126	Devotee		Thankot, Chandragiri	Kathmandu		Upload Photo Upload Photo
NP-KTMCG-127	Garudh Idol		Thankot, Chandragiri	Kathmandu		Upload Photo Upload Photo
NP-KTMCG-128	Archive		Thankot, Chandragiri	Kathmandu		Upload Photo Upload Photo
NP-KTMCG-129	Lion		Thankot, Chandragiri	Kathmandu		Upload Photo Upload Photo
NP-KTMCG-130	Lion		Thankot, Chandragiri	Kathmandu		Upload Photo Upload Photo
NP-KTMCG-131	Stone Tap		Thankot, Chandragiri	Kathmandu		Upload Photo Upload Photo
NP-KTMCG-132	Murti At Baudha chaitya		Thankot, Chandragiri	Kathmandu		Upload Photo Upload Photo
NP-KTMCG-133	Chaitya		Thankot, Chandragiri	Kathmandu		Upload Photo Upload Photo
NP-KTMCG-134	Shivalinga		Thankot, Chandragiri	Kathmandu		Upload Photo Upload Photo
NP-KTMCG-135	Kalleshwor		Thankot, Chandragiri	Kathmandu		Upload Photo Upload Photo
NP-KTMCG-136	Buddha Idol		Thankot, Chandragiri	Kathmandu		Upload Photo Upload Photo
NP-KTMCG-137	Buddha Idol		Thankot, Chandragiri	Kathmandu		Upload Photo Upload Photo
NP-KTMCG-138	Buddha Idol		Thankot, Chandragiri	Kathmandu		Upload Photo Upload Photo
NP-KTMCG-139	Mahalaxmi Temple		Thankot, Chandragiri	Kathmandu		Upload Photo Upload Photo
NP-KTMCG-140	Silapatra		Thankot, Chandragiri	Kathmandu		Upload Photo Upload Photo
NP-KTMCG-141	Under the dwarsakha		Thankot, Chandragiri	Kathmandu		Upload Photo Upload Photo
NP-KTMCG-142	Gatekeeper		Thankot, Chandragiri	Kathmandu		Upload Photo Upload Photo
NP-KTMCG-143	Gatekeeper		Thankot, Chandragiri	Kathmandu		Upload Photo Upload Photo
NP-KTMCG-144	Lion		Thankot, Chandragiri	Kathmandu		Upload Photo Upload Photo
NP-KTMCG-145	Lion		Thankot, Chandragiri	Kathmandu		Upload Photo Upload Photo
NP-KTMCG-146	Umanheshwar		Thankot, Chandragiri	Kathmandu		Upload Photo Upload Photo
NP-KTMCG-147	Archive		Thankot, Chandragiri	Kathmandu		Upload Photo Upload Photo
NP-KTMCG-148	Bhakth Bhakthini		Thankot, Chandragiri	Kathmandu		Upload Photo Upload Photo
NP-KTMCG-149	Ganesh Statue		Thankot, Chandragiri	Kathmandu		Upload Photo Upload Photo
NP-KTMCG-150	Purna Klash		Thankot, Chandragiri	Kathmandu		Upload Photo Upload Photo
NP-KTMCG-151	Part behind three idols		Thankot, Chandragiri	Kathmandu		Upload Photo Upload Photo
NP-KTMCG-152	Umamaheshowr		Thankot, Chandragiri	Kathmandu		Upload Photo Upload Photo
NP-KTMCG-153	Stone Inscription		Thankot, Chandragiri	Kathmandu		Upload Photo Upload Photo
NP-KTMCG-154	Stone Tap		Thankot, Chandragiri	Kathmandu		Upload Photo Upload Photo
NP-KTMCG-155	Umamaheshwor		Thankot, Chandragiri	Kathmandu		Upload Photo Upload Photo
NP-KTMCG-156	Bhairab Murthi chhepu		Thankot, Chandragiri	Kathmandu		Upload Photo Upload Photo
NP-KTMCG-157	Lion		Thankot, Chandragiri	Kathmandu		Upload Photo Upload Photo
NP-KTMCG-158	Lioness		Thankot, Chandragiri	Kathmandu		Upload Photo Upload Photo
NP-KTMCG-159	Ganesh Temple		Satungal, Chandragiri	Kathmandu		Ganesh Temple Upload Photo
NP-KTMCG-160	Ganesh Idol		Satungal, Chandragiri	Kathmandu		Upload Photo Upload Photo
NP-KTMCG-161	Lion		Satungal, Chandragiri	Kathmandu		Upload Photo Upload Photo
NP-KTMCG-162	Lion		Satungal, Chandragiri	Kathmandu		Upload Photo Upload Photo
NP-KTMCG-163	Dharmadhatu Mandal		Satungal, Chandragiri	Kathmandu		Upload Photo Upload Photo
NP-KTMCG-164	Chaitya		Satungal, Chandragiri	Kathmandu		Chaitya Upload Photo
NP-KTMCG-165	Bhairav Temple		Satungal, Chandragiri	Kathmandu		Bhairav Temple Upload Photo
NP-KTMCG-166	Lion		Satungal, Chandragiri	Kathmandu		Lion Upload Photo
NP-KTMCG-167	Nasadau		Satungal, Chandragiri	Kathmandu		Upload Photo Upload Photo
NP-KTMCG-168	Chaitya		Satungal, Chandragiri	Kathmandu		Upload Photo Upload Photo
NP-KTMCG-169	Chaitya		Satungal, Chandragiri	Kathmandu		Upload Photo Upload Photo
NP-KTMCG-170	Dedya Falcha		Satungal, Chandragiri	Kathmandu		Upload Photo Upload Photo
NP-KTMCG-171	Archive		Satungal, Chandragiri	Kathmandu		Upload Photo Upload Photo
NP-KTMCG-172	Paduka		Satungal, Chandragiri	Kathmandu		Upload Photo Upload Photo
NP-KTMCG-173	Narayan Temple		Satungal, Chandragiri	Kathmandu		Upload Photo Upload Photo
NP-KTMCG-174	narayan		Satungal, Chandragiri	Kathmandu		Upload Photo Upload Photo
NP-KTMCG-175	Bishnu Idol		Satungal, Chandragiri	Kathmandu		Upload Photo Upload Photo
NP-KTMCG-176	Bishnu		Satungal, Chandragiri	Kathmandu		Upload Photo Upload Photo
NP-KTMCG-177	Bull		Satungal, Chandragiri	Kathmandu		Bull Upload Photo
NP-KTMCG-178	Dabali		Satungal, Chandragiri	Kathmandu		Upload Photo Upload Photo
NP-KTMCG-179	Buddha Temple		Satungal, Chandragiri	Kathmandu		Buddha Temple Upload Photo
NP-KTMCG-180	Buddha		Satungal, Chandragiri	Kathmandu		Buddha Upload Photo
NP-KTMCG-181	Bhajanghar		Satungal, Chandragiri	Kathmandu		Bhajanghar Upload Photo
NP-KTMCG-182	Krishna Temple		Satungal, Chandragiri	Kathmandu		Krishna Temple Upload Photo
NP-KTMCG-183	Krihshna Gopini		Satungal, Chandragiri	Kathmandu		Upload Photo Upload Photo
NP-KTMCG-184	Ramsita		Satungal, Chandragiri	Kathmandu		Ramsita Upload Photo
NP-KTMCG-185	Laxminarayan		Satungal, Chandragiri	Kathmandu		Upload Photo Upload Photo
NP-KTMCG-186	Umamaheshwor		Satungal, Chandragiri	Kathmandu		Umamaheshwor Upload Photo
NP-KTMCG-187	Chaturbyuha Bishnu		Satungal, Chandragiri	Kathmandu		Chaturbyuha Bishnu Upload Photo
NP-KTMCG-188	Bhimsen Idol		Satungal, Chandragiri	Kathmandu		Upload Photo Upload Photo
NP-KTMCG-189	Ganesh Idol		Satungal, Chandragiri	Kathmandu		Ganesh Idol Upload Photo
NP-KTMCG-190	Lion		Satungal, Chandragiri	Kathmandu		Upload Photo Upload Photo
NP-KTMCG-191	Lion		Satungal, Chandragiri	Kathmandu		Upload Photo Upload Photo
NP-KTMCG-192	Umamaheshwor Temple		Satungal, Chandragiri	Kathmandu		Umamaheshwor Temple Upload Photo
NP-KTMCG-193	Umamaheshwor		Satungal, Chandragiri	Kathmandu		Upload Photo Upload Photo
NP-KTMCG-194	Hanuman Idol		Satungal, Chandragiri	Kathmandu		Upload Photo Upload Photo
NP-KTMCG-195	Bhairav		Satungal, Chandragiri	Kathmandu		Upload Photo Upload Photo
NP-KTMCG-196	Bishnudevi Temple		Satungal, Chandragiri	Kathmandu		Upload Photo Upload Photo
NP-KTMCG-197	Entrance of Bishnudevi Temple		Satungal, Chandragiri	Kathmandu		Upload Photo Upload Photo
NP-KTMCG-198	Lion		Satungal, Chandragiri	Kathmandu		Upload Photo Upload Photo
NP-KTMCG-199	Lion		Satungal, Chandragiri	Kathmandu		Upload Photo Upload Photo
NP-KTMCG-200	Bells		Satungal, Chandragiri	Kathmandu		Upload Photo Upload Photo
NP-KTMCG-201	Saraswati Sthan		Satungal, Chandragiri	Kathmandu		Upload Photo Upload Photo
NP-KTMCG-202	Jaldroni		Satungal, Chandragiri	Kathmandu		Upload Photo Upload Photo
NP-KTMCG-203	Ganesh Temple		Satungal, Chandragiri	Kathmandu		Upload Photo Upload Photo
NP-KTMCG-204	Shiva Temple		Satungal, Chandragiri	Kathmandu		Upload Photo Upload Photo
NP-KTMCG-205	Shivalinga		Satungal, Chandragiri	Kathmandu		Upload Photo Upload Photo
NP-KTMCG-206	Shivalinga		Satungal, Chandragiri	Kathmandu		Upload Photo Upload Photo
NP-KTMCG-207	Ganesh Temple		Satungal, Chandragiri	Kathmandu		Upload Photo Upload Photo
NP-KTMCG-208	Kwath Ghar		Satungal, Chandragiri	Kathmandu		Upload Photo Upload Photo
NP-KTMCG-209	Archive		Satungal, Chandragiri	Kathmandu		Upload Photo Upload Photo

== See also ==
- List of monuments in Kathmandu District
- List of monuments in Nepal
