= List of monuments in Kirtipur, Nepal =

This is a list of monuments in Kirtipur Municipality within Kathmandu District, Nepal as officially recognized by and available through the website of the Department of Archaeology, Nepal. Kirtipur is a historically rich area and Hindu temples are the main attraction.

== List of monuments ==
ID	Name	Type	Location	District	Coordinates	Image
NP-KTMKP-01	Amogapaas Lokeshwar		Bhutkhel, Kirtipur	Kathmandu		Upload Photo Upload Photo
NP-KTMKP-02	Vishwakarma Bhimsen		Bhutkhel, Kirtipur	Kathmandu		Upload Photo Upload Photo
NP-KTMKP-03	Aadinath Temple		Bhutkhel, Kirtipur	Kathmandu		Upload Photo Upload Photo
NP-KTMKP-04	Bhajanmandal Temple		Bhutkhel, Kirtipur	Kathmandu		Upload Photo Upload Photo
NP-KTMKP-05	Mahadev Ghandharweshwar MAndir Adinath		Bhutkhel, Kirtipur	Kathmandu		Upload Photo Upload Photo
NP-KTMKP-06	Chaitya		Bhutkhel, Kirtipur	Kathmandu		Upload Photo Upload Photo
NP-KTMKP-07	Jhalvinayak Temple		Bhutkhel, Kirtipur	Kathmandu		Upload Photo Upload Photo
NP-KTMKP-08	Jhalvinayak Muldhwar		Bhutkhel, Kirtipur	Kathmandu		Upload Photo Upload Photo
NP-KTMKP-09	Jalvinayak's Archive		Bhutkhel, Kirtipur	Kathmandu		Upload Photo Upload Photo
NP-KTMKP-10	Radha Rukmani and Krishna		Bhutkhel, Kirtipur	Kathmandu		Upload Photo Upload Photo
NP-KTMKP-11	Shivalaya		Bhutkhel, Kirtipur	Kathmandu		Upload Photo Upload Photo
NP-KTMKP-12	Smal Devasthal		Bhutkhel, Kirtipur	Kathmandu		Upload Photo Upload Photo
NP-KTMKP-13	Pati		Chobhar, Kirtipur	Kathmandu		Upload Photo Upload Photo
NP-KTMKP-14	Chaitya		Chobhar, Kirtipur	Kathmandu		Upload Photo Upload Photo
NP-KTMKP-15	Dabali		Chobhar, Kirtipur	Kathmandu		Upload Photo Upload Photo
NP-KTMKP-16	Champadevi		Champadevi, Kirtipur	Kathmandu		Champadevi Upload Photo
NP-KTMKP-17	Ampadevi		Champadevi, Kirtipur	Kathmandu		Upload Photo Upload Photo
NP-KTMKP-18	Bhalkumari Temple		Panga, Kirtipur	Kathmandu		Upload Photo Upload Photo
NP-KTMKP-19	Pati		Panga, Kirtipur	Kathmandu		Upload Photo Upload Photo
NP-KTMKP-20	Pati		Panga, Kirtipur	Kathmandu		Upload Photo Upload Photo
NP-KTMKP-21	Pati		Panga, Kirtipur	Kathmandu		Upload Photo Upload Photo
NP-KTMKP-22	Narayan Temple		Panga, Kirtipur	Kathmandu		Upload Photo Upload Photo
NP-KTMKP-23	Mahamaaya		Panga, Kirtipur	Kathmandu		Upload Photo Upload Photo
NP-KTMKP-24	Pati		Panga, Kirtipur	Kathmandu		Upload Photo Upload Photo
NP-KTMKP-25	Vishnu Devi Temple		Panga, Kirtipur	Kathmandu		Upload Photo Upload Photo
NP-KTMKP-26	Harishankar Narayan Temple		Panga, Kirtipur	Kathmandu		Upload Photo Upload Photo
NP-KTMKP-27	Chilancho		Kirtipur	Kathmandu	27°40′36″N 85°16′42″E	Chilancho Upload Photo
NP-KTMKP-28	Bagh Bhairab Temple		Kirtipur	Kathmandu	27°40′46″N 85°16′33″E	Upload Photo Upload Photo
NP-KTMKP-29	Uma Maheshwor Temple		Kirtipur	Kathmandu	27°40′48″N 85°16′30″E	Upload Photo Upload Photo

== See also ==
- List of monuments in Kathmandu District
- List of monuments in Nepal
