= List of monuments in Ramechhap, Nepal =

This is a list of monuments in Ramechhap District, Nepal as officially recognized by and available through the website of the Department of Archaeology, Nepal. Ramechhap is a district of Bagmati Province and is located in central Nepal. Hindu temples are the main attraction of this district. There are several few mountains in this district. The highest mountain in this district is Numbur Mountain.

== List of monuments ==
ID	Name	Type	Location	District	Coordinates	Image
NP-RAM-01	Hiledevi Temple		Hiledevi	Ramechhap		Upload Photo Upload Photo
NP-RAM-02	Gaukhureshor Mahadev Temple			Ramechhap		Upload Photo Upload Photo
NP-RAM-03	Dhaaraapani (Dhungedhaaraa)			Ramechhap		Upload Photo Upload Photo
NP-RAM-04	Narmadeshwar Mahadev (Shibaalaya)			Ramechhap		Upload Photo Upload Photo
NP-RAM-05	Howaang Chhiring Monastery			Ramechhap		Upload Photo Upload Photo
NP-RAM-06	Gaaikhura Narmadeshwar Temple Complex			Ramechhap		Upload Photo Upload Photo
NP-RAM-07	Kyaama Monastery			Ramechhap		Upload Photo Upload Photo

== See also ==
- List of monuments in Bagmati Province
- List of monuments in Nepal
