= List of monuments in Khotang, Nepal =

This is a list of monuments in Khotang District, Nepal as officially recognized by and available through the website of the Department of Archaeology, Nepal.

== List of monuments ==
ID	Name	Type	Location	District	Coordinates	Image
NP-KHO-01	Halesi Mahadebsthaan			Khotang		Halesi Mahadebsthaan Upload Photo
NP-KHO-02	Majhuwa Gadhi			Khotang		Upload Photo Upload Photo

== See also ==
- List of monuments in Province No. 1
- List of monuments in Nepal
