= List of monuments in Koshi =

Koshi Province (Nepali: कोशी प्रदेश) is one of the seven provinces of Nepal established by the country's new constitution of 20 September 2015, comprising fourteen districts, namely, Bhojpur, Dhankuta, Ilam, Jhapa, Khotang, Morang, Okhaldhunga, Panchthar, Sankhuwasabha, Solukhumbu, Sunsari, Taplejung, Terhathum and Udayapur. There are many categorized monument sites in Koshi Province. Here is a district wise List of Monuments which is in the Koshi Province.

== Lists per district of Koshi Province ==
- List of monuments in Bhojpur District
- List of monuments in Dhankuta District
- List of monuments in Ilam District
- List of monuments in Jhapa District
- List of monuments in Khotang District
- List of monuments in Morang District
- List of monuments in Okhaldhunga District
- List of monuments in Panchthar District
- List of monuments in Sankhuwasabha District
- List of monuments in Solukhumbu District
- List of monuments in Sunsari District
- List of monuments in Taplejung District
- List of monuments in Terhathum District
- List of monuments in Udayapur District
