= List of monuments in Siraha, Nepal =

This is a list of monuments in Siraha District, Nepal as officially recognized by and available through the website of the Department of Archaeology, Nepal.

== List of monuments ==
| ID | Name | Type | Location | District | Coordinates | Image |
|---|---|---|---|---|---|---|
| NP-SIR-01 | Thakurgadh | | Bhawanipur | Siraha | | Upload Photo Upload Photo |
| NP-SIR-02 | Pakariyagarh | | Salahesh | Siraha | | Upload Photo Upload Photo |
| NP-SIR-03 | Bakhar Banauli | | | Siraha | | Upload Photo Upload Photo |
| NP-SIR-04 | Shiv Temple | | Sarswar | Siraha | | Upload Photo Upload Photo |

== See also ==
- List of monuments in Province No. 2
- List of monuments in Nepal
