= List of monuments in Okhaldhunga, Nepal =

This is a list of monuments in Okhaldhunga District, Nepal as officially recognized by and available through the website of the Department of Archaeology, Nepal.

== List of monuments ==
ID	Name	Type	Location	District	Coordinates	Image
NP-OKH-01	Chandi Devi Temple		Jantarkhani	Okhaldhunga		Upload Photo Upload Photo
NP-OKH-02	Tolu Gumba Monastery			Okhaldhunga		Upload Photo Upload Photo
NP-OKH-03	Chandisthan Gupha (Cave)		Ragini	Okhaldhunga		Upload Photo Upload Photo
NP-OKH-04	Kirateshwor Mahadev Jahakari Baba temple		Richuwa	Okhaldhunga		Upload Photo Upload Photo
NP-OKH-05	Kotgadhi			Okhaldhunga		Upload Photo Upload Photo

== See also ==
- List of monuments in Province No. 1
- List of monuments in Nepal
