= List of monuments in Mahottari, Nepal =

This is a list of monuments in Mahottari District, Nepal as officially recognized by and available through the website of the Department of Archaeology, Nepal. Mahottari is a district of Province No. 2 and is located in southern Nepal. Hindu temples are the main attraction of this district.

== List of monuments ==
ID	Name	Type	Location	District	Coordinates	Image
NP-MAH-01	Jaleshwar Mahadev Temple			Mahottari	26°39′01″N 85°47′46″E	Jaleshwar Mahadev Temple Upload Photo
NP-MAH-02	Matiyani Gadh			Mahottari	26°36′43″N 85°50′48″E	Upload Photo Upload Photo
NP-MAH-03	Bhairab Temple			Mahottari		Upload Photo Upload Photo
NP-MAH-04	Raani Ratanwaara Math			Mahottari	26°39′30″N 85°47′48″E	Upload Photo Upload Photo
NP-MAH-05	Laxmi Narayan Temple			Mahottari	26°36′44″N 85°50′55″E	Upload Photo Upload Photo
NP-MAH-06	Thaakur Temple (Ram Temple)			Mahottari		Upload Photo Upload Photo
NP-MAH-07	Ancient Well of Bishnupur			Mahottari	26°38′42″N 85°46′29″E	Upload Photo Upload Photo
NP-MAH-08	Bidhapati Gadh (Raajapuraaditya Gadh)			Mahottari		Upload Photo Upload Photo
NP-MAH-09	Rekha mai sthan			Mahottari		Upload Photo Upload Photo

== See also ==
- List of monuments in Province No. 2
- List of monuments in Nepal
