= List of Monuments of National Importance in Puducherry =

This is a list of Monuments of National Importance (ASI) as officially recognized by and available through the website of the Archaeological Survey of India in the Indian union territory Puducherry. The monument identifier is a combination of the abbreviation of the subdivision of the list (state, ASI circle) and the numbering as published on the website of the ASI. 7 Monuments of National Importance have been recognized by the ASI in Puducherry.

== List of monuments ==
SL. No.	Description	Location	Address	District	Coordinates	Image
N-PY-1	Mulanathaswami Temple	Bahour		Pondicherry	11°48′25″N 79°44′32″E	Mulanathaswami Temple More images
N-PY-2	Thirukundangudimahadeva Temple	Madagadipattu		Pondicherry	11°55′01″N 79°38′11″E	Thirukundangudimahadeva Temple More images
N-PY-3	Swayambunathaswamy Temple	Nedungadu		Karaikal	10°58′03″N 79°46′16″E	Swayambunathaswamy Temple
N-PY-4	Ekambaresvara Temple	Sethur	Madhur Road	Karaikal	10°56′03″N 79°44′36″E	Upload Photo
N-PY-5	Varadaraja Perumal Temple	Thirubhuvani		Manniadipeth	11°55′39″N 79°38′51″E	Varadaraja Perumal Temple More images
N-PY-6	Panchanadisvara Temple	Thiruvandarkoil		Pondicherry	11°55′08″N 79°39′26″E	Panchanadisvara Temple More images
N-PY-7	Arikamedu, Early Historic Site	Ariyankuppam		Pondicherry	11°53′52″N 79°49′01″E	Arikamedu, Early Historic Site More images
