= List of monuments in Bhojpur, Nepal =

This is a list of monuments in Bhojpur District, Nepal as officially recognized by and available through the website of the Department of Archaeology, Nepal. Bhojpur is a district of Province No. 1 and is located in eastern Nepal. Hindu temples are the main attraction of this district.

== List of monuments ==
ID	Name	Type	Location	District	Coordinates	Image
NP-BHO-01	Bhimsen Temple			Bhojpur		Upload Photo Upload Photo
NP-BHO-02	Ajima Maata Temple			Bhojpur		Upload Photo Upload Photo
NP-BHO-03	Siddhibinayak Temple			Bhojpur		Upload Photo Upload Photo
NP-BHO-04	Panchbuddha Chaitya			Bhojpur		Upload Photo Upload Photo
NP-BHO-05	Sidhhakali Temple			Bhojpur		Upload Photo Upload Photo
NP-BHO-06	Hatuwa Gadhi			Bhojpur		Upload Photo Upload Photo

== See also ==
- List of monuments in Province No. 1
- List of monuments in Nepal
