= List of monuments in Sankhuwasabha, Nepal =

This is a list of monuments in Sankhuwasabha District, Nepal as officially recognized by and available through the website of the Department of Archaeology, Nepal. Sankhuwasabha is a district of Province No. 1 and is located in eastern Nepal. Hindu temples are the main attraction of this district.

== List of monuments ==
ID	Name	Type	Location	District	Coordinates	Image
NP-SAN-01	Manakamana Devi Temple			Sankhuwasabha		Upload Photo Upload Photo
NP-SAN-02	Dudhnaath Mahadev Temple			Sankhuwasabha		Upload Photo Upload Photo
NP-SAN-03	Ram Temple			Sankhuwasabha		Upload Photo Upload Photo
NP-SAN-04	Basnyaat Pauwa (Mejar Paati)			Sankhuwasabha		Upload Photo Upload Photo
NP-SAN-05	Baneshwar Mahadev			Sankhuwasabha		Upload Photo Upload Photo
NP-SAN-06	Yaang Guthi Gonpa			Sankhuwasabha		Upload Photo Upload Photo
NP-SAN-07	Chhorten Saamba (New Mound)			Sankhuwasabha		Upload Photo Upload Photo
NP-SAN-08	Lingang Chholing Gonpa			Sankhuwasabha		Upload Photo Upload Photo
NP-SAN-09	Kaangyur Gonpa			Sankhuwasabha		Upload Photo Upload Photo
NP-SAN-10	Hedaangana Gadhi (Historical Monument)			Sankhuwasabha		Upload Photo Upload Photo
NP-SAN-11	Lungden Gadhi (Historical Monument)			Sankhuwasabha		Upload Photo Upload Photo

== See also ==
- List of monuments in Province No. 1
- List of monuments in Nepal
