= List of monuments in Solukhumbu, Nepal =

This is a list of monuments in Solukhumbu District, Nepal as officially recognized by and available through the website of the Department of Archaeology, Nepal.

== List of monuments ==
ID	Name	Type	Location	District	Coordinates	Image
NP-SOL-01	Taasi Thokman Monastery			Solukhumbu		Upload Photo Upload Photo
NP-SOL-02	Kerok Monastery			Solukhumbu		Upload Photo Upload Photo
NP-SOL-03	Tengboche Monastery		Tengboche	Solukhumbu		Tengboche Monastery Upload Photo
NP-SOL-04	Paangboche Monastery		Pangboche	Solukhumbu		Upload Photo Upload Photo

== See also ==
- List of monuments in Province No. 1
- List of monuments in Nepal
