= List of monuments in Udayapur, Nepal =

This is a list of monuments in Udayapur District, Nepal as officially recognized by and available through the website of the Department of Archaeology, Nepal.

== List of monuments ==
ID	Name	Type	Location	District	Coordinates	Image
NP-UDA-01	Churiyamai Temple			Udayapur		Upload Photo Upload Photo
NP-UDA-02	Bindhyabaasini Temple			Udayapur		Upload Photo Upload Photo
NP-UDA-03	Udayapur Gadhi			Udayapur		Upload Photo Upload Photo
NP-UDA-04	Chaudandi Gadhi			Udayapur		Upload Photo Upload Photo
NP-UDA-05	Prastar Khaat			Udayapur		Upload Photo Upload Photo

== See also ==
- List of monuments in Province No. 1
- List of monuments in Nepal
