= List of monuments in Terhathum, Nepal =

This is a list of monuments in Tehrathum District, Nepal as officially recognized by and available through the website of the Department of Archaeology, Nepal. Terhathum is a district of Province No. 1 and is located in eastern Nepal. Hindu temples are the main attraction of this district.

== List of monuments ==
ID	Name	Type	Location	District	Coordinates	Image
NP-TER-01	Narayansthan Mandir			Tehrathum		Upload Photo Upload Photo
NP-TER-01	Shree Bhagwati Temple			Tehrathum		Upload Photo Upload Photo

== See also ==
- List of monuments in Province No. 1
- List of monuments in Nepal
