= List of monuments in Dhankuta, Nepal =

This is a list of monuments in Dhankuta District, Nepal as officially recognized by and available through the website of the Department of Archaeology, Nepal. Dhankuta is a district of Province No. 1 and is located in eastern Nepal. Hindu temples are the main attraction of this district.

== List of monuments ==
ID	Name	Type	Location	District	Coordinates	Image
NP-DHK-01	Bhimsen Temple			Dhankuta	26°58′35″N 87°20′24″E	Upload Photo Upload Photo
NP-DHK-02	Singheshwar Mahadev			Dhankuta		Upload Photo Upload Photo
NP-DHK-03	Gokundeshwar Mahadev			Dhankuta		Upload Photo Upload Photo
NP-DHK-04	52 Door Palace			Dhankuta		Upload Photo Upload Photo
NP-DHK-05	Karmacharya Paati			Dhankuta		Upload Photo Upload Photo
NP-DHK-06	Narbadeshwor Mahadev			Dhankuta	26°58′11″N 87°20′37″E	Upload Photo Upload Photo
NP-DHK-07	Shree Panchami Temple			Dhankuta	26°58′58″N 87°20′21″E	Upload Photo Upload Photo

== See also ==
- List of monuments in Province No. 1
- List of monuments in Nepal
