= List of monuments in Jhapa, Nepal =

This is a list of monuments in Jhapa District, Nepal as officially recognized by and available through the website of the Department of Archaeology, Nepal. Jhapa is a district of Province No. 1 and is located in eastern parts of Nepal. Hindu temples are the main attraction of this district.

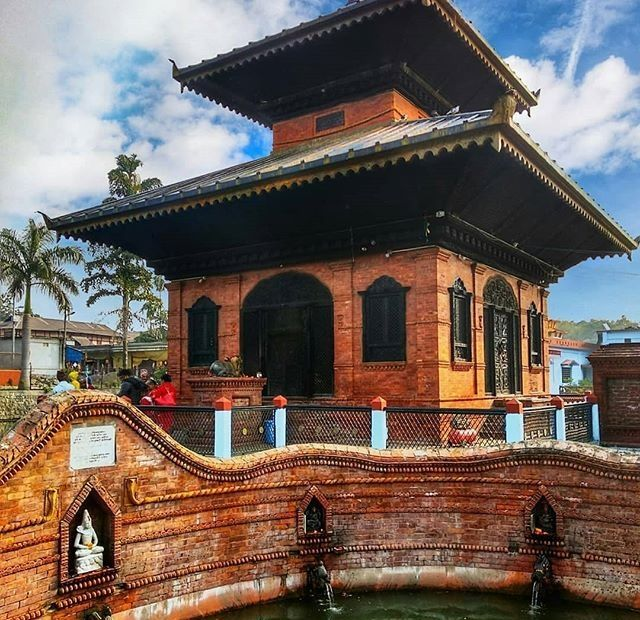
Arjundhara Temple

== List of monuments ==
ID	Name	Type	Location	District	Coordinates	Image
NP-JHA-01	Arjundhara Temple			Jhapa		Arjundhara Temple Upload Photo
NP-JHA-02	Dhanus Koti Temple			Jhapa		Dhanus Koti Temple Upload Photo
NP-JHA-03	Kankai Dham			Jhapa		Upload Photo Upload Photo
NP-JHA-04	Kichak Badh Temple			Jhapa		Upload Photo Upload Photo

== See also ==
- List of monuments in Province No. 1
- List of monuments in Nepal
