= List of monuments in Panchthar, Nepal =

This is a list of monuments in Panchthar District, Nepal as officially recognized by and available through the website of the Department of Archaeology, Nepal. Panchthar is a district of Province No. 1 and is located in eastern Nepal. Hindu temples and Buddhist monasteries are the main attraction of this district.

== List of monuments ==
ID	Name	Type	Location	District	Coordinates	Image
NP-PAN-01	Jay Kaalika Thaan (Nishaan Temple)			Panchthar		Upload Photo Upload Photo
NP-PAN-02	Shree Sangchayo (Aagejung Monastery)			Panchthar		Upload Photo Upload Photo
NP-PAN-03	Hiliaang Palace (Ruins)			Panchthar		Upload Photo Upload Photo
NP-PAN-04	Kummayak (Siddha Devi Mandir)		Kummayak	Panchthar		Upload Photo Upload Photo

== See also ==
- List of monuments in Province No. 1
- List of monuments in Nepal
