= List of monuments in Taplejung, Nepal =

This is a list of monuments in Taplejung District, Nepal as officially recognized by and available through the website of the Department of Archaeology, Nepal. Taplejung is a district of Province No. 1 and is located in eastern Nepal. Buddhist monasteries are the main attraction of this district.

== List of monuments ==
ID	Name	Type	Location	District	Coordinates	Image
NP-TAP-01	Taasi Chayoling Monastery			Taplejung		Upload Photo Upload Photo
NP-TAP-02	Diki Chhyoling monastery			Taplejung		Upload Photo Upload Photo
NP-TAP-03	Yaanglijung Monastery			Taplejung		Upload Photo Upload Photo

== See also ==
- List of monuments in Province No. 1
- List of monuments in Nepal
