= List of monuments in Nepal =

Nepal's cultural heritage includes archaeological sites, temples, monasteries, shrines, tombs, buildings, residences, monuments, and places of worship. The Ancient Monument Protection Act 1956 (Prachin Smarak Samrakshan Ain 2013 BS) has defined monuments as “Any temple, monument, house, Devalaya, Shivalaya, Muth, monastery, vihar, stupa etc that is older than 100 years and has historical significance is monument.”

The Ancient Monument Protection Act 1956 and Ancient Monument Protection Rules 1990 have provisioned the Department of Archaeology which is the authorized legal entity to protect such monuments. The department has published books in series comprising information about classified protected archaeological sites and monuments of Nepal which is the authentic information according to the law. The rule has authorized the department to categorize the monuments.

Some non-governmental organizations have also published such information regarding protected monuments in Nepal.

== List of monuments by provinces ==
Since 2015, Nepal is divided into seven provinces. The following are the province-wise lists of monuments in Nepal:

- List of monuments in Koshi Province
- List of monuments in Madhesh Province
- List of monuments in Bagmati Province
- List of monuments in Gandaki Province
- List of monuments in Karnali Province
- List of monuments in Lumbini Province
- List of monuments in Sudurpashchim Province

== List of monuments by former zones ==
Until the establishment of provinces in 2015, Nepal was divided into 14 administrative zones. The following are the zone-wise lists of monuments in Nepal:

- List of monuments in Bagmati Zone
- List of monuments in Bheri Zone
- List of monuments in Dhawalagiri Zone
- List of monuments in Gandaki Zone
- List of monuments in Janakpur Zone
- List of monuments in Karnali Zone
- List of monuments in Kosi Zone
- List of monuments in Lumbini Zone
- List of monuments in Mahakali Zone
- List of monuments in Mechi Zone
- List of monuments in Narayani Zone
- List of monuments in Rapti Zone
- List of monuments in Sagarmatha Zone
- List of monuments in Seti Zone

== Notes ==
The list of monuments is based on data from the Government of Nepal, Department of Archaeology. Some prominent monuments' names are missing.
