= List of monuments in Bagmati Province =

Bagmati Province, formerly Bagmati Pradesh (Nepali: प्रदेश नं.३), is one of the seven provinces of Nepal established by the country's new constitution of 20 September 2015, comprising thirteen districts, namely Bhaktapur, Chitwan, Dhading, Dolakha, Kathmandu, Kavrepalanchok, Lalitpur, Makwanpur, Nuwakot, Ramechhap, Rasuwa, Sindhuli and Sindhupalchok. There are many categorized monuments sites in Bagmati Province.

== Lists per district of Bagmati Province ==
- List of monuments in Bhaktapur District
- List of monuments in Chitwan District
- List of monuments in Dhading District
- List of monuments in Dolakha District
- List of monuments in Kathmandu District
- List of monuments in Kavrepalanchok District
- List of monuments in Lalitpur District
- List of monuments in Makwanpur District
- List of monuments in Nuwakot District
- List of monuments in Ramechhap District
- List of monuments in Rasuwa District
- List of monuments in Sindhuli District
- List of monuments in Sindhupalchok District

== Additional lists – Inside Kathmandu Valley ==
=== Hanumandhoka Palace Area ===
- List of monuments in Kathmandu Hanumandhoka Palace Area (KHP)

=== Kathmandu Metropolis Area ===
- List of monuments in Metropolis 1, Kathmandu
- List of monuments in Metropolis 2, Kathmandu
- List of monuments in Metropolis 3, Kathmandu
- List of monuments in Metropolis 4, Kathmandu
- List of monuments in Metropolis 5, Kathmandu
- List of monuments in Metropolis 6, Kathmandu
- List of monuments in Metropolis 7, Kathmandu
- List of monuments in Metropolis 8, Kathmandu
- List of monuments in Metropolis 9, Kathmandu
- List of monuments in Metropolis 10, Kathmandu
- List of monuments in Metropolis 11, Kathmandu
- List of monuments in Metropolis 12, Kathmandu
- List of monuments in Metropolis 13, Kathmandu
- List of monuments in Metropolis 14, Kathmandu
- List of monuments in Metropolis 15, Kathmandu
- List of monuments in Metropolis 16, Kathmandu
- List of monuments in Metropolis 17, Kathmandu
- List of monuments in Metropolis 18, Kathmandu
- List of monuments in Metropolis 19, Kathmandu
- List of monuments in Metropolis 20, Kathmandu

=== Along Bagmati River in Kathmandu Valley ===
- List of monuments along Thapathali–Teku stretch of Bagmati River

=== Village areas in Kathmandu District ===
- List of monuments in Budanilkantha, Nepal
- List of monuments in Chandragiri, Nepal
- List of monuments in Dakshinkali, Nepal
- List of monuments in Kageshwari Manohara, Nepal
- List of monuments in Kirtipur, Nepal
- List of monuments in Shankharapur, Nepal
- List of monuments in Tarakeshwar, Nepal
- List of monuments in Tokha, Nepal
- List of monuments in Balambu, Nepal
- List of monuments in Bhutkhel, Nepal
- List of monuments in Budhanilakantha, Nepal
- List of monuments in Chalnakhel, Nepal
- List of monuments in Champadevi, Nepal
- List of monuments in Chhaimale, Nepal
- List of monuments in Chobhar Adinath, Nepal
- List of monuments in Danchhi, Nepal
- List of monuments in Dharmasthali, Nepal
- List of monuments in Futung, Nepal
- List of monuments in Gagalphedi, Nepal
- List of monuments in Goldhunga, Nepal
- List of monuments in Gongabu, Nepal
- List of monuments in Gothatar, Nepal
- List of monuments in Indraini, Nepal
- List of monuments in Jitpur, Nepal
- List of monuments in Kavresthali, Nepal
- List of monuments in Lapsiphedi, Nepal
- List of monuments in Machhenarayan, Nepal
- List of monuments in Manamaiju, Nepal
- List of monuments in Mulpani, Nepal
- List of monuments in Nanglebhare, Nepal
- List of monuments in Panga, Nepal
- List of monuments in Pukhalachi, Nepal
- List of monuments in Sangla, Nepal
- List of monuments in Satungal, Nepal
- List of monuments in Saukhel, Nepal
- List of monuments in Sunkot, Nepal
- List of monuments in Thankot, Nepal
- List of monuments in Tokha-Chandeshwori, Nepal
- List of monuments in Bajrayogini, Nepal

=== Bhaktapur Durbar Area ===
- List of monuments in Bhaktapur District

=== Lalitpur Durbar Area ===
- List of monuments in Lalitpur District
