= List of monuments in Kathmandu, Nepal =

This is a list of monuments in Kathmandu District, Nepal, as officially recognized by and available through the website of the Department of Archaeology, Nepal. Kathmandu is a district of Bagmati Province and is located in central northern Nepal. It includes Kathmandu Metropolitan City, the capital of Nepal. The district is a historically rich area and Hindu temples are the main attraction.

== Lists per administrative subdivision of Kathmandu District ==
Kathmandu District consists of 10 municipalities and 1 metropolitan city. Kathmandu Metropolitan City is administratively subdivided into 32 wards.

10 Municipalities	Kathmandu Metropolitan City
List of monuments in Budhanilkantha Municipality; List of monuments in Chandragiri Municipality; List of monuments in Dakshinkali Municipality; List of monuments in Gokarneshwar Municipality; List of monuments in Kageshwari-Manohara Municipality; List of monuments in Kirtipur Municipality; List of monuments in Nagarjun Municipality; List of monuments in Shankharapur Municipality; List of monuments in Tarakeshwar Municipality; List of monuments in Tokha Municipality	List of monuments in Metropolis 1; List of monuments in Metropolis 2; List of monuments in Metropolis 3; List of monuments in Metropolis 4; List of monuments in Metropolis 5; List of monuments in Metropolis 6; List of monuments in Metropolis 7; List of monuments in Metropolis 8; List of monuments in Metropolis 9; List of monuments in Metropolis 10; List of monuments in Metropolis 11; List of monuments in Metropolis 12; List of monuments in Metropolis 13; List of monuments in Metropolis 14; List of monuments in Metropolis 15; List of monuments in Metropolis 16; List of monuments in Metropolis 17; List of monuments in Metropolis 18; List of monuments in Metropolis 19; List of monuments in Metropolis 20; lists for wards 21–32 are missing Special list for main parts of Kathmandu Durbar Square: List of monuments in Kathmandu HanumanDhoka Palace area (KHP)

== See also ==
- List of monuments in Bagmati Province
- List of monuments in Nepal
