= List of monuments in Sindhuli, Nepal =

This is a list of monuments in Sindhuli District, Nepal as officially recognized by and available through the website of the Department of Archaeology, Nepal. Sindhuli is a district of Bagmati Province and is located in central Nepal. Hindu temples are the main attraction of this district.

== List of monuments ==
ID	Name	Type	Location	District	Coordinates	Image
NP-SIN-01	Kusheswor Mahadevsthan		Kuseshwar	Sindhuli	27°27′02″N 85°48′52″E	Kusheswor Mahadevsthan Upload Photo
NP-SIN-02	Kamalamai Temple		Kamalamai	Sindhuli	27°09′58″N 85°53′53″E	Upload Photo Upload Photo
NP-SIN-03	Sindhuli Fort			Sindhuli	27°16′51″N 85°57′08″E	Sindhuli Fort Upload Photo
NP-SIN-04	Siddheshwori Temple			Sindhuli		Upload Photo Upload Photo
NP-SIN-05	Hariharpur Gadhi Darbar			Sindhuli		Hariharpur Gadhi Darbar Upload Photo
NP-SIN-06	Kalimai Temple			Sindhuli	27°12′30″N 85°54′29″E	Kalimai Temple Upload Photo
NP-SIN-07	Jharlan Thumki			Sindhuli		Upload Photo Upload Photo
NP-SIN-08	Madhuganga Baba Dham			Sindhuli		Upload Photo Upload Photo
NP-SIN-09	Sokhu Stream			Sindhuli		Upload Photo Upload Photo

== See also ==
- List of monuments in Bagmati Province
- List of monuments in Nepal
