= List of monuments in Makwanpur, Nepal =

This is a list of monuments in Makwanpur District, Nepal as officially recognized by and available through the website of the Department of Archaeology, Nepal. Makwanpur is a district of Bagmati Province and is located in central Nepal. Forts and Hindu temples are the main attraction of this district.

== List of monuments ==
ID	Name	Type	Location	District	Coordinates	Image
NP-MP-013	Ashuvarma's Archive			Makwanpur		Upload Photo Upload Photo
NP-MP-014	Udaydevko Abhilek			Makwanpur		Upload Photo Upload Photo
NP-MP-015	Makhwanpur Fort			Makwanpur		Makhwanpur Fort Upload Photo
NP-MP-016	Basantadev's Archive			Makwanpur		Upload Photo Upload Photo
NP-MP-017	Kunchal tole stone tap			Makwanpur		Upload Photo Upload Photo
NP-MP-018	Ganesh Temple			Makwanpur		Upload Photo Upload Photo
NP-MP-019	Taleju Bhawani Temple			Makwanpur		Upload Photo Upload Photo
NP-MP-020	Sattal			Makwanpur		Upload Photo Upload Photo
NP-MP-021	Shivalaya			Makwanpur		Upload Photo Upload Photo
NP-MP-022	Chilecha chaitya			Makwanpur		Upload Photo Upload Photo
NP-MP-023	Bhimsen Temple			Makwanpur		Upload Photo Upload Photo
NP-MP-024	Pati			Makwanpur		Upload Photo Upload Photo
NP-MP-025	Chaitya lichhivi			Makwanpur		Upload Photo Upload Photo
NP-MP-026	Krishna Temple			Makwanpur		Upload Photo Upload Photo
NP-MP-027	Residence of Sri Tin Maharaj			Makwanpur		Upload Photo Upload Photo
NP-MP-028	Pandukeshwar Mahadev			Makwanpur		Upload Photo Upload Photo
NP-MP-029	Lampati			Makwanpur		Upload Photo Upload Photo
NP-MP-030	Chisapani Gadhi			Makwanpur		Chisapani Gadhi Upload Photo
NP-MP-031	Palung Palace Hill			Makwanpur		Upload Photo Upload Photo
NP-MP-032	Old fort at Gairidanda			Makwanpur		Upload Photo Upload Photo

== See also ==
- List of monuments in Bagmati Province
- List of monuments in Nepal
