= List of monuments in Chitwan, Nepal =

This is a list of monuments in Chitwan District, Nepal as officially recognized by and available through the website of the Department of Archaeology, Nepal. Chitwan is a district of Bagmati Province and is located in central southern Nepal. Hindu temples are the main attraction of this district.

== List of monuments ==
ID	Name	Type	Location	District	Coordinates	Image
NP-CT-01	Valmikhi Ashram			Chitwan		Valmikhi Ashram Upload Photo
NP-CT-02	Thakurbhaari Temple			Chitwan		Upload Photo Upload Photo
NP-CT-03	Upardang gadhi			Chitwan		Upload Photo Upload Photo

== See also ==
- List of monuments in Bagmati Province
- List of monuments in Nepal
