= List of monuments in Metropolis 11, Kathmandu =

This is a list of Monuments in Kathmandu Metropolis -11, officially recognized by and available through the website of the Department of Archaeology, Nepal in the Kathmandu District. Kathmandu is a historically rich city and Hindu temples are the main attraction of this Metropolis. The monument list below is populated using the authentic information at Department of Archaeology.

== List of Monuments ==
| ID | Name | Type | Location | District | Coordinates | Image |
|---|---|---|---|---|---|---|
| NP-KMC11-01 | Kaji Sattal | | Kathmandu Metropolis-11 | Kathmandu | | Upload Photo Upload Photo |
| NP-KMC11-02 | Puret Ghat Sattal | | Kathmandu Metropolis-11 | Kathmandu | | Upload Photo Upload Photo |
| NP-KMC11-03 | Dakshinkali Temple | | Kathmandu Metropolis-11 | Kathmandu | | Upload Photo Upload Photo |
| NP-KMC11-04 | Ganesh Deval (Shiva Vinayak) | | Kathmandu Metropolis-11 | Kathmandu | | Upload Photo Upload Photo |
| NP-KMC11-05 | Aryaghat Sattal | | Kathmandu Metropolis-11 | Kathmandu | | Upload Photo Upload Photo |
| NP-KMC11-06 | Lokeshwor Temple | | Kathmandu Metropolis-11 | Kathmandu | | Upload Photo Upload Photo |
| NP-KMC11-07 | Purneshwar Mahadev temple | | Kathmandu Metropolis-11 | Kathmandu | | Upload Photo Upload Photo |
| NP-KMC11-08 | Dharmashala Juddha Ghat | | Kathmandu Metropolis-11 | Kathmandu | | Upload Photo Upload Photo |
| NP-KMC11-09 | Dharmashala Chandra Ghat | | Kathmandu Metropolis-11 | Kathmandu | | Upload Photo Upload Photo |
| NP-KMC11-10 | Ramghat Pati Hanumansthan | | Kathmandu Metropolis-11 | Kathmandu | | Upload Photo Upload Photo |
| NP-KMC11-11 | Suryraj Ganesh temple | | Kathmandu Metropolis-11 | Kathmandu | | Upload Photo Upload Photo |
| NP-KMC11-12 | Tripureshwar Mahadev temple | | Kathmandu Metropolis-11 | Kathmandu | | Tripureshwar Mahadev temple Upload Photo |
| NP-KMC11-13 | Pati | | Kathmandu Metropolis-11 | Kathmandu | | Pati Upload Photo |
| NP-KMC11-14 | Hanuman temple | | Kathmandu Metropolis-11 | Kathmandu | | Hanuman temple Upload Photo |
| NP-KMC11-15 | Ramachandra temple | | Kathmandu Metropolis-11 | Kathmandu | | Upload Photo Upload Photo |
| NP-KMC11-16 | Shivamandir (Dudhpokhari Temple) | | Kathmandu Metropolis-11 | Kathmandu | | Upload Photo Upload Photo |
| NP-KMC11-17 | Hanumansthan | | Kathmandu Metropolis-11 | Kathmandu | | Hanumansthan Upload Photo |
| NP-KMC11-18 | Dharmashala Kalmochan | | Kathmandu Metropolis-11 | Kathmandu | | Upload Photo Upload Photo |
| NP-KMC11-19 | Pati Kalmochan | | Kathmandu Metropolis-11 | Kathmandu | | Upload Photo Upload Photo |
| NP-KMC11-20 | Vadanmukteshwar Mahadev temple | | Kathmandu Metropolis-11 | Kathmandu | | Vadanmukteshwar Mahadev temple Upload Photo |
| NP-KMC11-21 | Narmadeshwar Mahadev temple | | Kathmandu Metropolis-11 | Kathmandu | | Narmadeshwar Mahadev temple Upload Photo |
| NP-KMC11-22 | Jangahem Hiranya Narayan Temple | | Kathmandu Metropolis-11 | Kathmandu | | Upload Photo Upload Photo |
| NP-KMC11-23 | Sattal Kalmocn | | Kathmandu Metropolis-11 | Kathmandu | | Upload Photo Upload Photo |
| NP-KMC11-24 | Bairagi Akhada Kalmochan | | Kathmandu Metropolis-11 | Kathmandu | | Upload Photo Upload Photo |
| NP-KMC11-25 | Tin Shivalaya Akhada | | Kathmandu Metropolis-11 | Kathmandu | | Tin Shivalaya Akhada Upload Photo |
| NP-KMC11-26 | Dashnami Sanyashi Akhada | | Kathmandu Metropolis-11 | Kathmandu | | Dashnami Sanyashi Akhada Upload Photo |
| NP-KMC11-27 | Panchayan Temple | | Kathmandu Metropolis-11 | Kathmandu | | Upload Photo Upload Photo |
| NP-KMC11-28 | Jagnanda Prakasheshwar Mahadev | | Kathmandu Metropolis-11 | Kathmandu | | Upload Photo Upload Photo |
| NP-KMC11-29 | Laxminarayan Temple | | Kathmandu Metropolis-11 | Kathmandu | | Laxminarayan Temple Upload Photo |
| NP-KMC11-30 | Jangmukteshwar Mahadev temple | | Kathmandu Metropolis-11 | Kathmandu | | Upload Photo Upload Photo |
| NP-KMC11-31 | Panchayan Temple (Jagnand Prakareshwar) | | Kathmandu Metropolis-11 | Kathmandu | | Upload Photo Upload Photo |
| NP-KMC11-32 | Laxminarayan Temple | | Kathmandu Metropolis-11 | Kathmandu | | Upload Photo Upload Photo |
| NP-KMC11-33 | Udashi Akhada | | Kathmandu Metropolis-11 | Kathmandu | | Udashi Akhada Upload Photo |
| NP-KMC11-34 | Namahrishwar Mahadev temple | | Kathmandu Metropolis-11 | Kathmandu | | Upload Photo Upload Photo |
| NP-KMC11-35 | Gopal Mandir | | Kathmandu Metropolis-11 | Kathmandu | | Gopal Mandir Upload Photo |

== See also ==
- List of Monuments in Bagmati Zone
- List of Monuments in Nepal
