= List of monuments in Metropolis 9, Kathmandu =

This is a list of Monuments in Kathmandu Metropolis -9, officially recognized by and available through the website of the Department of Archaeology, Nepal in the Kathmandu District. Kathmandu is a historically rich city and Hindu temples are the main attraction of this Metropolis. The monument list below is populated using the authentic information at Department of Archaeology.

== List of Monuments ==
ID	Name	Type	Location	District	Coordinates	Image
NP-KMC09-01	Ramachandra temple		Kathmandu Metropolis-09			Upload Photo Upload Photo
NP-KMC09-02	Ramchandra Temple Sattal		Kathmandu Metropolis-09			Ramchandra Temple Sattal Upload Photo
NP-KMC09-03	Hanuman temple		Kathmandu Metropolis-09			Hanuman temple Upload Photo
NP-KMC09-04	Sun Statue		Kathmandu Metropolis-09			Sun Statue Upload Photo
NP-KMC09-05	Vishnu statue		Kathmandu Metropolis-09			Vishnu statue Upload Photo
NP-KMC09-06	Ramachandra temple Shilapatra		Kathmandu Metropolis-09			Upload Photo Upload Photo
NP-KMC09-07	Vishnumurti		Kathmandu Metropolis-09			Upload Photo Upload Photo
NP-KMC09-08	Shivalaya		Kathmandu Metropolis-09			Shivalaya Upload Photo

== See also ==
- List of Monuments in Bagmati Zone
- List of Monuments in Nepal
