= List of monuments in Metropolis 5, Kathmandu =

This is a list of Monuments in Kathmandu Metropolis -5, officially recognized by and available through the website of the Department of Archaeology, Nepal in the Kathmandu District. Kathmandu is a historically rich city and Hindu temples are the main attraction of this Metropolis. The monument list below is populated using the authentic information at Department of Archaeology.

== List of Monuments ==
ID	Name	Type	Location	District	Coordinates	Image
NP-KMC05-01	Gneshsthan (Chhatra Ganesh)		Kathmandu Metropolis-05	Kathmandu		Gneshsthan (Chhatra Ganesh) Upload Photo
NP-KMC05-02	Shilamandal		Kathmandu Metropolis-05	Kathmandu		Upload Photo Upload Photo
NP-KMC05-03	Kumarithan Chundevi		Kathmandu Metropolis-05	Kathmandu		Upload Photo Upload Photo
NP-KMC05-04	Ganesh Deval		Kathmandu Metropolis-05	Kathmandu		Upload Photo Upload Photo
NP-KMC05-05	Temple of Batbhateni		Kathmandu Metropolis-05	Kathmandu		Temple of Batbhateni Upload Photo
NP-KMC05-06	Batbhateni Temple Copper Toran		Kathmandu Metropolis-05	Kathmandu		Upload Photo Upload Photo
NP-KMC05-07	Bhatbhateni Temple Lions		Kathmandu Metropolis-05	Kathmandu		Bhatbhateni Temple Lions Upload Photo
NP-KMC05-08	Batbhateni Temple Jhallar		Kathmandu Metropolis-05	Kathmandu		Upload Photo Upload Photo
NP-KMC05-09	Pati		Kathmandu Metropolis-05	Kathmandu		Pati Upload Photo
NP-KMC05-10	Pati		Kathmandu Metropolis-05	Kathmandu		Upload Photo Upload Photo
NP-KMC05-11	Archive		Kathmandu Metropolis-05	Kathmandu		Upload Photo Upload Photo
NP-KMC05-12	Sattal		Kathmandu Metropolis-05	Kathmandu		Upload Photo Upload Photo
NP-KMC05-13	Pati		Kathmandu Metropolis-05	Kathmandu		Upload Photo Upload Photo
NP-KMC05-14	Chaitya		Kathmandu Metropolis-05	Kathmandu		Upload Photo Upload Photo
NP-KMC05-15	Bhairav ??Sthan		Kathmandu Metropolis-05	Kathmandu		Upload Photo Upload Photo
NP-KMC05-16	Dhungedhara		Kathmandu Metropolis-05	Kathmandu		Upload Photo Upload Photo
NP-KMC05-17	Dhungedhara		Kathmandu Metropolis-05	Kathmandu		Upload Photo Upload Photo
NP-KMC05-18	Vishnu statue		Kathmandu Metropolis-05	Kathmandu		Upload Photo Upload Photo
NP-KMC05-19	Stone Inscription		Kathmandu Metropolis-05	Kathmandu		Upload Photo Upload Photo
NP-KMC05-20	Bhimsen Temple		Kathmandu Metropolis-05	Kathmandu		Upload Photo Upload Photo
NP-KMC05-21	Ganesh Temple		Kathmandu Metropolis-05	Kathmandu		Upload Photo Upload Photo
NP-KMC05-22	Vishnu Shridhar Umamaheshwar		Kathmandu Metropolis-05	Kathmandu		Upload Photo Upload Photo
NP-KMC05-23	Chhetrapal Bhairav ??		Kathmandu Metropolis-05	Kathmandu		Upload Photo Upload Photo
NP-KMC05-24	Narayan Mandir		Kathmandu Metropolis-05	Kathmandu		Upload Photo Upload Photo
NP-KMC05-25	Narayan		Kathmandu Metropolis-05	Kathmandu		Upload Photo Upload Photo
NP-KMC05-26	Sridhar Narayan Temple		Kathmandu Metropolis-05	Kathmandu		Upload Photo Upload Photo
NP-KMC05-27	Narayan temple inscription		Kathmandu Metropolis-05	Kathmandu		Upload Photo Upload Photo
NP-KMC05-28	Chaitya		Kathmandu Metropolis-05	Kathmandu		Upload Photo Upload Photo
NP-KMC05-29	Krishna temple		Kathmandu Metropolis-05	Kathmandu		Upload Photo Upload Photo
NP-KMC05-30	Sun temple		Kathmandu Metropolis-05	Kathmandu		Upload Photo Upload Photo
NP-KMC05-31	Shridhar Vishnu		Kathmandu Metropolis-05	Kathmandu		Upload Photo Upload Photo
NP-KMC05-32	Ganesh Deval		Kathmandu Metropolis-05	Kathmandu		Upload Photo Upload Photo
NP-KMC05-33	Saraswati		Kathmandu Metropolis-05	Kathmandu		Upload Photo Upload Photo
NP-KMC05-34	Shivalinga		Kathmandu Metropolis-05	Kathmandu		Upload Photo Upload Photo
NP-KMC05-35	Jaldroni		Kathmandu Metropolis-05	Kathmandu		Upload Photo Upload Photo
NP-KMC05-36	Shilastambha		Kathmandu Metropolis-05	Kathmandu		Shilastambha Upload Photo
NP-KMC05-37	Pati		Kathmandu Metropolis-05	Kathmandu		Upload Photo Upload Photo
NP-KMC05-38	Stone Inscription		Kathmandu Metropolis-05	Kathmandu		Stone Inscription Upload Photo
NP-KMC05-39	Chaitya		Kathmandu Metropolis-05	Kathmandu		Upload Photo Upload Photo
NP-KMC05-40	Pati		Kathmandu Metropolis-05	Kathmandu		Upload Photo Upload Photo
NP-KMC05-41	Pati		Kathmandu Metropolis-05	Kathmandu		Upload Photo Upload Photo
NP-KMC05-42	Pati		Kathmandu Metropolis-05	Kathmandu		Upload Photo Upload Photo
NP-KMC05-43	Pati		Kathmandu Metropolis-05	Kathmandu		Upload Photo Upload Photo
NP-KMC05-44	Archive		Kathmandu Metropolis-05	Kathmandu		Upload Photo Upload Photo
NP-KMC05-45	Tundaldevi Temple Dya Chhe		Kathmandu Metropolis-05	Kathmandu		Upload Photo Upload Photo
NP-KMC05-46	Gatekeeper Lion		Kathmandu Metropolis-05	Kathmandu		Upload Photo Upload Photo
NP-KMC05-47	Tundaldevi Toran		Kathmandu Metropolis-05	Kathmandu		Upload Photo Upload Photo
NP-KMC05-48	Toran		Kathmandu Metropolis-05	Kathmandu		Upload Photo Upload Photo
NP-KMC05-49	Saraswati temple		Kathmandu Metropolis-05	Kathmandu		Upload Photo Upload Photo
NP-KMC05-50	Umamaheshwar statue		Kathmandu Metropolis-05	Kathmandu		Upload Photo Upload Photo
NP-KMC05-51	Laxminarayan		Kathmandu Metropolis-05	Kathmandu		Upload Photo Upload Photo
NP-KMC05-52	Pati		Kathmandu Metropolis-05	Kathmandu		Upload Photo Upload Photo
NP-KMC05-53	Chaturmurti Vishnu statue		Kathmandu Metropolis-05	Kathmandu		Upload Photo Upload Photo
NP-KMC05-54	Ganesh Idol		Kathmandu Metropolis-05	Kathmandu		Upload Photo Upload Photo
NP-KMC05-55	Matrikaa Statues		Kathmandu Metropolis-05	Kathmandu		Upload Photo Upload Photo
NP-KMC05-56	Narayani		Kathmandu Metropolis-05	Kathmandu		Upload Photo Upload Photo
NP-KMC05-57	Grud Stambha		Kathmandu Metropolis-05	Kathmandu		Upload Photo Upload Photo
NP-KMC05-58	Ancient Statues		Kathmandu Metropolis-05	Kathmandu		Upload Photo Upload Photo
NP-KMC05-59	Buddhako Mar Vijaya		Kathmandu Metropolis-05	Kathmandu		Upload Photo Upload Photo
NP-KMC05-60	Vaishnavi		Kathmandu Metropolis-05	Kathmandu		Upload Photo Upload Photo
NP-KMC05-61	Kuber		Kathmandu Metropolis-05	Kathmandu		Upload Photo Upload Photo
NP-KMC05-62	Maheshwar, Barahi		Kathmandu Metropolis-05	Kathmandu		Upload Photo Upload Photo
NP-KMC05-63	Vishnu's fragmentary statue		Kathmandu Metropolis-05	Kathmandu		Upload Photo Upload Photo
NP-KMC05-64	Chamunda		Kathmandu Metropolis-05	Kathmandu		Upload Photo Upload Photo
NP-KMC05-65	Satyanarayana Temple		Kathmandu Metropolis-05	Kathmandu		Upload Photo Upload Photo
NP-KMC05-66	Chaturmuki Shiva Temple		Kathmandu Metropolis-05	Kathmandu		Upload Photo Upload Photo
NP-KMC05-67	Fourfold Shivalinga		Kathmandu Metropolis-05	Kathmandu		Upload Photo Upload Photo
NP-KMC05-68	Uma Maheshwar		Kathmandu Metropolis-05	Kathmandu		Upload Photo Upload Photo
NP-KMC05-69	Basaha		Kathmandu Metropolis-05	Kathmandu		Upload Photo Upload Photo
NP-KMC05-70	Shiva statue		Kathmandu Metropolis-05	Kathmandu		Upload Photo Upload Photo
NP-KMC05-71	Shiva Family statue		Kathmandu Metropolis-05	Kathmandu		Upload Photo Upload Photo
NP-KMC05-72	Ganesh		Kathmandu Metropolis-05	Kathmandu		Upload Photo Upload Photo
NP-KMC05-73	Shivalinga		Kathmandu Metropolis-05	Kathmandu		Upload Photo Upload Photo
NP-KMC05-74	Kumar Kartikeya temple		Kathmandu Metropolis-05	Kathmandu		Upload Photo Upload Photo
NP-KMC05-75	Six headed statue of Kumar		Kathmandu Metropolis-05	Kathmandu		Upload Photo Upload Photo
NP-KMC05-76	Stupa		Kathmandu Metropolis-05	Kathmandu		Upload Photo Upload Photo
NP-KMC05-77	Chhawaskamuni		Kathmandu Metropolis-05	Kathmandu		Upload Photo Upload Photo
NP-KMC05-78	inscription in Pati		Kathmandu Metropolis-05	Kathmandu		Upload Photo Upload Photo
NP-KMC05-79	Umamaheshwar		Kathmandu Metropolis-05	Kathmandu		Upload Photo Upload Photo
NP-KMC05-80	Pratikatmak Shila		Kathmandu Metropolis-05	Kathmandu		Upload Photo Upload Photo
NP-KMC05-81	Panchakumari Dya Chhe		Kathmandu Metropolis-05	Kathmandu		Upload Photo Upload Photo
NP-KMC05-82	Lions		Kathmandu Metropolis-05	Kathmandu		Upload Photo Upload Photo
NP-KMC05-83	Shatkon of Chaitya		Kathmandu Metropolis-05	Kathmandu		Upload Photo Upload Photo
NP-KMC05-84	Manmaneshwari		Kathmandu Metropolis-05	Kathmandu		Upload Photo Upload Photo
NP-KMC05-85	Gahana Pokhari		Kathmandu Metropolis-05	Kathmandu		Gahana Pokhari Upload Photo
NP-KMC05-86	HariShankar Temple		Kathmandu Metropolis-05	Kathmandu		Upload Photo Upload Photo
NP-KMC05-87	Gatta lotus symbol of Kshetrapal		Kathmandu Metropolis-05	Kathmandu		Upload Photo Upload Photo
NP-KMC05-88	Umamaheshwar		Kathmandu Metropolis-05	Kathmandu		Upload Photo Upload Photo
NP-KMC05-89	Dhan Ganesh temple		Kathmandu Metropolis-05	Kathmandu		Upload Photo Upload Photo
NP-KMC05-90	Ganesh		Kathmandu Metropolis-05	Kathmandu		Upload Photo Upload Photo
NP-KMC05-91	Haygrib		Kathmandu Metropolis-05	Kathmandu		Upload Photo Upload Photo
NP-KMC05-92	Shivalinga		Kathmandu Metropolis-05	Kathmandu		Shivalinga Upload Photo
NP-KMC05-93	Shivalinga		Kathmandu Metropolis-05	Kathmandu		Upload Photo Upload Photo
NP-KMC05-94	Ganesh		Kathmandu Metropolis-05	Kathmandu		Ganesh Upload Photo
NP-KMC05-95	Dewali Sthan		Kathmandu Metropolis-05	Kathmandu		Upload Photo Upload Photo
NP-KMC05-96	Chaitya		Kathmandu Metropolis-05	Kathmandu		Upload Photo Upload Photo

== See also ==
- List of Monuments in Bagmati Zone
- List of Monuments in Nepal
