= List of monuments in Metropolis 4, Kathmandu =

This is a list of Monuments in Kathmandu Metropolis -4, officially recognized by and available through the website of the Department of Archaeology, Nepal in the Kathmandu District. Kathmandu is a historically rich city and Hindu temples are the main attraction of this Metropolis.

== List of Monuments ==
ID	Name	Type	Location	District	Coordinates	Image
NP-KMC04-01	Ganesh Temple		Kathmandu Metropolis-04	Kathmandu		Upload Photo Upload Photo
NP-KMC04-02	Shiva Temple		Kathmandu Metropolis-04	Kathmandu		Upload Photo Upload Photo
NP-KMC04-03	Panchamukhi Shivamandir		Kathmandu Metropolis-04	Kathmandu		Upload Photo Upload Photo
NP-KMC04-04	Thado Narayan		Kathmandu Metropolis-04	Kathmandu		Upload Photo Upload Photo
NP-KMC04-05	Tundaldevi (Torandevi) temple		Kathmandu Metropolis-04	Kathmandu		Upload Photo Upload Photo
NP-KMC04-06	Pati		Kathmandu Metropolis-04	Kathmandu		Upload Photo Upload Photo
NP-KMC04-07	Dhumbarahi		Kathmandu Metropolis-04	Kathmandu		Upload Photo Upload Photo
NP-KMC04-08	??Kirthimukhi Bhairav		Kathmandu Metropolis-04	Kathmandu		Upload Photo Upload Photo
NP-KMC04-09	Panchamuki Shivalinga		Kathmandu Metropolis-04	Kathmandu		Upload Photo Upload Photo
NP-KMC04-10	Sattal		Kathmandu Metropolis-04	Kathmandu		Upload Photo Upload Photo
NP-KMC04-11	Dhungedhara		Kathmandu Metropolis-04	Kathmandu		Upload Photo Upload Photo
NP-KMC04-12	Ganesh Devata		Kathmandu Metropolis-04	Kathmandu		Upload Photo Upload Photo
NP-KMC04-13	Toran Murti		Kathmandu Metropolis-04	Kathmandu		Upload Photo Upload Photo
NP-KMC04-14	Stone Inscription		Kathmandu Metropolis-04	Kathmandu		Upload Photo Upload Photo
NP-KMC04-15	Stone Inscription		Kathmandu Metropolis-04	Kathmandu		Upload Photo Upload Photo
NP-KMC04-16	Stone Inscription		Kathmandu Metropolis-04	Kathmandu		Upload Photo Upload Photo
NP-KMC04-17	Simhamurti		Kathmandu Metropolis-04	Kathmandu		Upload Photo Upload Photo
NP-KMC04-18	Ganesh Idol		Kathmandu Metropolis-04	Kathmandu		Upload Photo Upload Photo
NP-KMC04-19	Saraswati statue		Kathmandu Metropolis-04	Kathmandu		Upload Photo Upload Photo
NP-KMC04-20	Tara statue		Kathmandu Metropolis-04	Kathmandu		Upload Photo Upload Photo
NP-KMC04-21	Sridhar Narayan Statue		Kathmandu Metropolis-04	Kathmandu		Upload Photo Upload Photo
NP-KMC04-22	Garud Narayana Murti		Kathmandu Metropolis-04	Kathmandu		Upload Photo Upload Photo
NP-KMC04-23	Shivalinga		Kathmandu Metropolis-04	Kathmandu		Upload Photo Upload Photo
NP-KMC04-24	Tundaldevi Pati		Kathmandu Metropolis-04	Kathmandu		Upload Photo Upload Photo
NP-KMC04-25	Pati		Kathmandu Metropolis-04	Kathmandu		Upload Photo Upload Photo
NP-KMC04-26	Pote Devata		Kathmandu Metropolis-04	Kathmandu		Upload Photo Upload Photo
NP-KMC04-27	Toran Murti		Kathmandu Metropolis-04	Kathmandu		Upload Photo Upload Photo
NP-KMC04-28	Chaitya		Kathmandu Metropolis-04	Kathmandu		Upload Photo Upload Photo
NP-KMC04-29	Stone Torans		Kathmandu Metropolis-04	Kathmandu		Upload Photo Upload Photo
NP-KMC04-30	Tundaldeviko main Toran Murtis		Kathmandu Metropolis-04	Kathmandu		Upload Photo Upload Photo
NP-KMC04-31	Bhakta statue		Kathmandu Metropolis-04	Kathmandu		Upload Photo Upload Photo
NP-KMC04-32	Garud column		Kathmandu Metropolis-04	Kathmandu		Upload Photo Upload Photo
NP-KMC04-33	Shivalaya		Kathmandu Metropolis-04	Kathmandu		Upload Photo Upload Photo
NP-KMC04-34	Shikhar Deval		Kathmandu Metropolis-04	Kathmandu		Upload Photo Upload Photo

== See also ==
- List of Monuments in Bagmati Zone
- List of Monuments in Nepal
