= List of monuments in Dakshinkali, Nepal =

This is a list of monuments in Dakshinkali Municipality within Kathmandu District, Nepal as officially recognized by and available through the website of the Department of Archaeology, Nepal. Dakshinkali is a historically rich area and Hindu temples are the main attraction of this municipality.

== List of monuments ==
ID	Name	Type	Location	District	Coordinates	Image
NP-KTMDK-01	Mahadevsthan		Dakshinkali Municipality	Kathmandu		Upload Photo Upload Photo
NP-KTMDK-02	Kumaridevisthan		Dakshinkali Municipality	Kathmandu		Upload Photo Upload Photo
NP-KTMDK-03	Pati		Dakshinkali Municipality	Kathmandu		Upload Photo Upload Photo
NP-KTMDK-04	Ganesh wall and Stone tap		Dakshinkali Municipality	Kathmandu		Upload Photo Upload Photo
NP-KTMDK-05	Ghyampadevi		Dakshinkali Municipality	Kathmandu		Upload Photo Upload Photo
NP-KTMDK-06	Chyaroten chaitya		Dakshinkali Municipality	Kathmandu		Upload Photo Upload Photo
NP-KTMDK-07	Satkanya devi pati		Dakshinkali Municipality	Kathmandu		Upload Photo Upload Photo
NP-KTMDK-08	Katwal pond and stone tap		Dakshinkali Municipality	Kathmandu		Upload Photo Upload Photo
NP-KTMDK-09	Stone tap		Dakshinkali Municipality	Kathmandu		Upload Photo Upload Photo
NP-KTMDK-10	Ganesh Temple		Dakshinkali Municipality	Kathmandu		Upload Photo Upload Photo
NP-KTMDK-11	Ganesh		Dakshinkali Municipality	Kathmandu		Upload Photo Upload Photo
NP-KTMDK-12	Ganesh Temple Pati		Dakshinkali Municipality	Kathmandu		Upload Photo Upload Photo
NP-KTMDK-13	Bhairav Sthan		Dakshinkali Municipality	Kathmandu		Upload Photo Upload Photo
NP-KTMDK-14	Gotame Pate		Dakshinkali Municipality	Kathmandu		Upload Photo Upload Photo

== See also ==
- List of monuments in Kathmandu District
- List of monuments in Nepal
