= List of monuments in Metropolis 12, Kathmandu =

This is a list of Monuments in Kathmandu Metropolis -12, officially recognized by and available through the website of the Department of Archaeology, Nepal in the Kathmandu District. Kathmandu is a historically rich city and Hindu temples are the main attraction of this Metropolis. The monument list below is populated using the authentic information at Department of Archaeology.

== List of Monuments ==
ID	Name	Type	Location	District	Coordinates	Image
NP-KMC12-01	Karunamaya Temple		Kathmandu Metropolis-12	Kathmandu		Upload Photo Upload Photo
NP-KMC12-02	Vishnu Temple		Kathmandu Metropolis-12	Kathmandu		Vishnu Temple Upload Photo
NP-KMC12-03	Saraswati temple		Kathmandu Metropolis-12	Kathmandu		Saraswati temple Upload Photo
NP-KMC12-04	Sweta temple		Kathmandu Metropolis-12	Kathmandu		Upload Photo Upload Photo
NP-KMC12-05	Chaitya		Kathmandu Metropolis-12	Kathmandu		Upload Photo Upload Photo
NP-KMC12-06	Ganesh Deval		Kathmandu Metropolis-12	Kathmandu		Upload Photo Upload Photo
NP-KMC12-07	Bahr Berse Inar Agadiko Pati		Kathmandu Metropolis-12	Kathmandu		Upload Photo Upload Photo
NP-KMC12-08	Pati		Kathmandu Metropolis-12	Kathmandu		Upload Photo Upload Photo
NP-KMC12-09	Ganesh Temple		Kathmandu Metropolis-12	Kathmandu		Upload Photo Upload Photo
NP-KMC12-10	Dharmachakra Mahavihar		Kathmandu Metropolis-12	Kathmandu		Upload Photo Upload Photo
NP-KMC12-11	Navagraha		Kathmandu Metropolis-12	Kathmandu		Upload Photo Upload Photo
NP-KMC12-12	Brhmeshwar Mahadev temple		Kathmandu Metropolis-12	Kathmandu		Upload Photo Upload Photo
NP-KMC12-13	Brhmeshwar Shivalinga		Kathmandu Metropolis-12	Kathmandu		Upload Photo Upload Photo
NP-KMC12-14	Manisangh Mahavihar		Kathmandu Metropolis-12	Kathmandu		Upload Photo Upload Photo
NP-KMC12-15	Manisimha Mahavihara		Kathmandu Metropolis-12	Kathmandu		Upload Photo Upload Photo
NP-KMC12-16	Tettiskoti dev (Buddha) Temple		Kathmandu Metropolis-12	Kathmandu		Upload Photo Upload Photo
NP-KMC12-17	Jap Tun (Bahr Barse Inar)		Kathmandu Metropolis-12	Kathmandu		Jap Tun (Bahr Barse Inar) Upload Photo
NP-KMC12-18	Chaitya		Kathmandu Metropolis-12	Kathmandu		Upload Photo Upload Photo
NP-KMC12-19	Basundhara and Buddhist statue Deval		Kathmandu Metropolis-12	Kathmandu		Upload Photo Upload Photo
NP-KMC12-20	Chaitya		Kathmandu Metropolis-12	Kathmandu		Upload Photo Upload Photo
NP-KMC12-21	Chaitya		Kathmandu Metropolis-12	Kathmandu		Upload Photo Upload Photo
NP-KMC12-22	Chaitya		Kathmandu Metropolis-12	Kathmandu		Upload Photo Upload Photo
NP-KMC12-23	Chaitya		Kathmandu Metropolis-12	Kathmandu		Upload Photo Upload Photo
NP-KMC12-24	Chaitya		Kathmandu Metropolis-12	Kathmandu		Upload Photo Upload Photo
NP-KMC12-25	Chaitya		Kathmandu Metropolis-12	Kathmandu		Upload Photo Upload Photo
NP-KMC12-26	Chaitya		Kathmandu Metropolis-12	Kathmandu		Upload Photo Upload Photo
NP-KMC12-27	Chaitya		Kathmandu Metropolis-12	Kathmandu		Upload Photo Upload Photo
NP-KMC12-28	Chaitya		Kathmandu Metropolis-12	Kathmandu		Upload Photo Upload Photo
NP-KMC12-29	Jaman Gubhaju's Home		Kathmandu Metropolis-12	Kathmandu		Upload Photo Upload Photo
NP-KMC12-30	Chaityakar Temple		Kathmandu Metropolis-12	Kathmandu		Upload Photo Upload Photo
NP-KMC12-31	Chaitya		Kathmandu Metropolis-12	Kathmandu		Upload Photo Upload Photo
NP-KMC12-32	Temple of lokeshwar		Kathmandu Metropolis-12	Kathmandu		Upload Photo Upload Photo
NP-KMC12-33	Bajrabir Mahakal		Kathmandu Metropolis-12	Kathmandu		Upload Photo Upload Photo
NP-KMC12-34	Layaku Pati		Kathmandu Metropolis-12	Kathmandu		Upload Photo Upload Photo
NP-KMC12-35	Taleju Bhawani		Kathmandu Metropolis-12	Kathmandu		Upload Photo Upload Photo
NP-KMC12-36	Chaitya		Kathmandu Metropolis-12	Kathmandu		Upload Photo Upload Photo
NP-KMC12-37	Chaitya		Kathmandu Metropolis-12	Kathmandu		Upload Photo Upload Photo
NP-KMC12-38	Chaitya		Kathmandu Metropolis-12	Kathmandu		Upload Photo Upload Photo
NP-KMC12-39	Swet Ganesh		Kathmandu Metropolis-12	Kathmandu		Upload Photo Upload Photo
NP-KMC12-40	Pati		Kathmandu Metropolis-12	Kathmandu		Upload Photo Upload Photo
NP-KMC12-41	Chhetrapal		Kathmandu Metropolis-12	Kathmandu		Upload Photo Upload Photo
NP-KMC12-42	Mahakal Temple		Kathmandu Metropolis-12	Kathmandu		Upload Photo Upload Photo
NP-KMC12-43	Ilan Pati		Kathmandu Metropolis-12	Kathmandu		Upload Photo Upload Photo
NP-KMC12-44	Machali Navadurga Bhawani temple		Kathmandu Metropolis-12	Kathmandu		Upload Photo Upload Photo
NP-KMC12-45	Toran Machali		Kathmandu Metropolis-12	Kathmandu		Upload Photo Upload Photo
NP-KMC12-46	Toran		Kathmandu Metropolis-12	Kathmandu		Upload Photo Upload Photo
NP-KMC12-47	Trishul Machali		Kathmandu Metropolis-12	Kathmandu		Upload Photo Upload Photo
NP-KMC12-48	Shilapatra		Kathmandu Metropolis-12	Kathmandu		Upload Photo Upload Photo
NP-KMC12-49	Sattal		Kathmandu Metropolis-12	Kathmandu		Upload Photo Upload Photo
NP-KMC12-50	Ganeshsthan		Kathmandu Metropolis-12	Kathmandu		Upload Photo Upload Photo
NP-KMC12-51	Mahalaxmi Deval		Kathmandu Metropolis-12	Kathmandu		Upload Photo Upload Photo
NP-KMC12-52	Chaitya		Kathmandu Metropolis-12	Kathmandu		Upload Photo Upload Photo
NP-KMC12-53	Chaitya		Kathmandu Metropolis-12	Kathmandu		Upload Photo Upload Photo
NP-KMC12-54	Shivalinga		Kathmandu Metropolis-12	Kathmandu		Upload Photo Upload Photo
NP-KMC12-55	Pati		Kathmandu Metropolis-12	Kathmandu		Upload Photo Upload Photo
NP-KMC12-56	Kuleshwar		Kathmandu Metropolis-12	Kathmandu		Upload Photo Upload Photo
NP-KMC12-57	Pith Sthan		Kathmandu Metropolis-12	Kathmandu		Upload Photo Upload Photo
NP-KMC12-58	Pati		Kathmandu Metropolis-12	Kathmandu		Upload Photo Upload Photo
NP-KMC12-59	Pati		Kathmandu Metropolis-12	Kathmandu		Upload Photo Upload Photo
NP-KMC12-60	Saraswati temple		Kathmandu Metropolis-12	Kathmandu		Upload Photo Upload Photo
NP-KMC12-61	Saraswati statue		Kathmandu Metropolis-12	Kathmandu		Upload Photo Upload Photo
NP-KMC12-62	Padmapani Gyaneswor Dway		Kathmandu Metropolis-12	Kathmandu		Upload Photo Upload Photo
NP-KMC12-63	Ganeshsthan		Kathmandu Metropolis-12	Kathmandu		Upload Photo Upload Photo
NP-KMC12-64	Temple of Nrityanath		Kathmandu Metropolis-12	Kathmandu		Upload Photo Upload Photo
NP-KMC12-65	Chaityaharu		Kathmandu Metropolis-12	Kathmandu		Upload Photo Upload Photo
NP-KMC12-66	Shiva Parvati		Kathmandu Metropolis-12	Kathmandu		Upload Photo Upload Photo
NP-KMC12-67	Shiva Parvati Temple		Kathmandu Metropolis-12	Kathmandu		Upload Photo Upload Photo
NP-KMC12-68	Chaitya		Kathmandu Metropolis-12	Kathmandu		Upload Photo Upload Photo
NP-KMC12-69	Chaitya		Kathmandu Metropolis-12	Kathmandu		Upload Photo Upload Photo
NP-KMC12-70	Shiva Temple		Kathmandu Metropolis-12	Kathmandu		Upload Photo Upload Photo
NP-KMC12-71	Ganesh Idol		Kathmandu Metropolis-12	Kathmandu		Upload Photo Upload Photo
NP-KMC12-72	Chaityharu		Kathmandu Metropolis-12	Kathmandu		Upload Photo Upload Photo
NP-KMC12-73	Chaitya		Kathmandu Metropolis-12	Kathmandu		Upload Photo Upload Photo
NP-KMC12-74	Archive		Kathmandu Metropolis-12	Kathmandu		Upload Photo Upload Photo
NP-KMC12-75	Dhungedhara		Kathmandu Metropolis-12	Kathmandu		Upload Photo Upload Photo
NP-KMC12-76	Pakuhiti Dungedhara		Kathmandu Metropolis-12	Kathmandu		Upload Photo Upload Photo
NP-KMC12-77	Shivalinga		Kathmandu Metropolis-12	Kathmandu		Upload Photo Upload Photo
NP-KMC12-78	Shivalingas including Basaha		Kathmandu Metropolis-12	Kathmandu		Upload Photo Upload Photo
NP-KMC12-79	Bhakta Bhaktini Statues including Garud		Kathmandu Metropolis-12	Kathmandu		Upload Photo Upload Photo
NP-KMC12-80	Annapurna Kalash		Kathmandu Metropolis-12	Kathmandu		Upload Photo Upload Photo
NP-KMC12-81	Nrisinha		Kathmandu Metropolis-12	Kathmandu		Upload Photo Upload Photo
NP-KMC12-82	Shiva Parvati Durga Hanuman statue		Kathmandu Metropolis-12	Kathmandu		Upload Photo Upload Photo
NP-KMC12-83	Lion		Kathmandu Metropolis-12	Kathmandu		Upload Photo Upload Photo
NP-KMC12-84	Kumar		Kathmandu Metropolis-12	Kathmandu		Upload Photo Upload Photo
NP-KMC12-85	Kumari		Kathmandu Metropolis-12	Kathmandu		Upload Photo Upload Photo
NP-KMC12-86	Kuladevata Than and Pati		Kathmandu Metropolis-12	Kathmandu		Upload Photo Upload Photo
NP-KMC12-87	Sattal		Kathmandu Metropolis-12	Kathmandu		Upload Photo Upload Photo
NP-KMC12-88	Barkrishneshwar Shivamandir		Kathmandu Metropolis-12	Kathmandu		Upload Photo Upload Photo
NP-KMC12-89	Shivamandir		Kathmandu Metropolis-12	Kathmandu		Upload Photo Upload Photo
NP-KMC12-90	Temple of Dirghabhakteshwar		Kathmandu Metropolis-12	Kathmandu		Upload Photo Upload Photo
NP-KMC12-91	Hem Mukteshwar		Kathmandu Metropolis-12	Kathmandu		Upload Photo Upload Photo
NP-KMC12-92	Sattal		Kathmandu Metropolis-12	Kathmandu		Upload Photo Upload Photo
NP-KMC12-93	Shiva Temple		Kathmandu Metropolis-12	Kathmandu		Upload Photo Upload Photo
NP-KMC12-94	Sattal		Kathmandu Metropolis-12	Kathmandu		Upload Photo Upload Photo
NP-KMC12-95	Jalasayan Narayana Statue		Kathmandu Metropolis-12	Kathmandu		Upload Photo Upload Photo
NP-KMC12-96	Sattal		Kathmandu Metropolis-12	Kathmandu		Upload Photo Upload Photo
NP-KMC12-97	Ganesh Deval		Kathmandu Metropolis-12	Kathmandu		Upload Photo Upload Photo
NP-KMC12-98	Ganesh Idol		Kathmandu Metropolis-12	Kathmandu		Upload Photo Upload Photo
NP-KMC12-99	Mahavishnu including Shivalinga		Kathmandu Metropolis-12	Kathmandu		Upload Photo Upload Photo
NP-KMC12-100	Pati		Kathmandu Metropolis-12	Kathmandu		Upload Photo Upload Photo
NP-KMC12-101	Rajendrashwari Mahadev temple		Kathmandu Metropolis-12	Kathmandu		Upload Photo Upload Photo
NP-KMC12-102	Munsighat Sattal		Kathmandu Metropolis-12	Kathmandu		Upload Photo Upload Photo
NP-KMC12-103	Shiva Temple		Kathmandu Metropolis-12	Kathmandu		Upload Photo Upload Photo
NP-KMC12-104	Lichchavikalin Chaitya		Kathmandu Metropolis-12	Kathmandu		Upload Photo Upload Photo
NP-KMC12-105	Shivalaya		Kathmandu Metropolis-12	Kathmandu		Upload Photo Upload Photo
NP-KMC12-106	Shivalinga		Kathmandu Metropolis-12	Kathmandu		Shivalinga Upload Photo
NP-KMC12-107	Riseshwar Mahadevsthan		Kathmandu Metropolis-12	Kathmandu		Upload Photo Upload Photo
NP-KMC12-108	Umamaheshwar statue		Kathmandu Metropolis-12	Kathmandu		Upload Photo Upload Photo
NP-KMC12-109	Basaha		Kathmandu Metropolis-12	Kathmandu		Upload Photo Upload Photo
NP-KMC12-110	Sikali Ajima temple		Kathmandu Metropolis-12	Kathmandu		Upload Photo Upload Photo
NP-KMC12-111	Ganesh Deval		Kathmandu Metropolis-12	Kathmandu		Upload Photo Upload Photo
NP-KMC12-112	Chaitya		Kathmandu Metropolis-12	Kathmandu		Upload Photo Upload Photo
NP-KMC12-113	Shivalinga		Kathmandu Metropolis-12	Kathmandu		Upload Photo Upload Photo
NP-KMC12-114	Suryamurti		Kathmandu Metropolis-12	Kathmandu		Suryamurti Upload Photo
NP-KMC12-115	Mayadevi statue		Kathmandu Metropolis-12	Kathmandu		Upload Photo Upload Photo
NP-KMC12-116	Ganesh Idol		Kathmandu Metropolis-12	Kathmandu		Upload Photo Upload Photo
NP-KMC12-117	Harihar statue		Kathmandu Metropolis-12	Kathmandu		Upload Photo Upload Photo
NP-KMC12-118	Shilapatra		Kathmandu Metropolis-12	Kathmandu		Shilapatra Upload Photo
NP-KMC12-119	Bhairav ??statue		Kathmandu Metropolis-12	Kathmandu		Bhairav ??statue Upload Photo
NP-KMC12-120	Sattal Manandhar		Kathmandu Metropolis-12	Kathmandu		Upload Photo Upload Photo
NP-KMC12-121	Pati		Kathmandu Metropolis-12	Kathmandu		Upload Photo Upload Photo
NP-KMC12-122	Hanuman statue		Kathmandu Metropolis-12	Kathmandu		Hanuman statue Upload Photo
NP-KMC12-123	Chintamani Vihar		Kathmandu Metropolis-12	Kathmandu		Upload Photo Upload Photo
NP-KMC12-124	Padmpani lokeswor and Dhyani Buddhas		Kathmandu Metropolis-12	Kathmandu		Upload Photo Upload Photo
NP-KMC12-125	Chaitya		Kathmandu Metropolis-12	Kathmandu		Upload Photo Upload Photo
NP-KMC12-126	Radha Krishna Temple Tekudoban		Kathmandu Metropolis-12	Kathmandu		Upload Photo Upload Photo
NP-KMC12-127	Stone column		Kathmandu Metropolis-12	Kathmandu		Upload Photo Upload Photo
NP-KMC12-128	Chaitya		Kathmandu Metropolis-12	Kathmandu		Upload Photo Upload Photo
NP-KMC12-129	Badrinath idol		Kathmandu Metropolis-12	Kathmandu		Badrinath idol Upload Photo
NP-KMC12-130	Jagannath idol		Kathmandu Metropolis-12	Kathmandu		Jagannath idol Upload Photo
NP-KMC12-131	Dwarikanath statue		Kathmandu Metropolis-12	Kathmandu		Dwarikanath statue Upload Photo
NP-KMC12-132	Rameshwar		Kathmandu Metropolis-12	Kathmandu		Rameshwar Upload Photo
NP-KMC12-133	Dharmdhatu Chaitya		Kathmandu Metropolis-12	Kathmandu		Upload Photo Upload Photo
NP-KMC12-134	Chaitya		Kathmandu Metropolis-12	Kathmandu		Upload Photo Upload Photo
NP-KMC12-135	Chaitya		Kathmandu Metropolis-12	Kathmandu		Upload Photo Upload Photo
NP-KMC12-136	Chaitya		Kathmandu Metropolis-12	Kathmandu		Upload Photo Upload Photo
NP-KMC12-137	Chaitya		Kathmandu Metropolis-12	Kathmandu		Upload Photo Upload Photo
NP-KMC12-138	Chaitya Group		Kathmandu Metropolis-12	Kathmandu		Upload Photo Upload Photo
NP-KMC12-139	Riseshwar		Kathmandu Metropolis-12	Kathmandu		Upload Photo Upload Photo
NP-KMC12-140	Krishna Statues		Kathmandu Metropolis-12	Kathmandu		Upload Photo Upload Photo
NP-KMC12-141	Shiva statue		Kathmandu Metropolis-12	Kathmandu		Shiva statue Upload Photo
NP-KMC12-142	Ram Statue		Kathmandu Metropolis-12	Kathmandu		Ram Statue Upload Photo
NP-KMC12-143	Buddha statue		Kathmandu Metropolis-12	Kathmandu		Buddha statue Upload Photo
NP-KMC12-144	Vishnu statue		Kathmandu Metropolis-12	Kathmandu		Upload Photo Upload Photo
NP-KMC12-145	Shivalinga and Basaha statue		Kathmandu Metropolis-12	Kathmandu		Shivalinga and Basaha statue Upload Photo
NP-KMC12-146	Ganesh Idol		Kathmandu Metropolis-12	Kathmandu		Ganesh Idol Upload Photo
NP-KMC12-147	Bhairav		Kathmandu Metropolis-12	Kathmandu		Upload Photo Upload Photo
NP-KMC12-148	Ganga statue		Kathmandu Metropolis-12	Kathmandu		Upload Photo Upload Photo
NP-KMC12-149	Jamuna statue		Kathmandu Metropolis-12	Kathmandu		Upload Photo Upload Photo
NP-KMC12-150	Saraswati statue		Kathmandu Metropolis-12	Kathmandu		Saraswati statue Upload Photo
NP-KMC12-151	Ramachandra temple		Kathmandu Metropolis-12	Kathmandu		Upload Photo Upload Photo
NP-KMC12-152	Narayan		Kathmandu Metropolis-12	Kathmandu		Narayan Upload Photo
NP-KMC12-153	Lakshmi		Kathmandu Metropolis-12	Kathmandu		Upload Photo Upload Photo
NP-KMC12-154	Karunamaya Machchendranath		Kathmandu Metropolis-12	Kathmandu		Upload Photo Upload Photo
NP-KMC12-155	Shivalaya		Kathmandu Metropolis-12	Kathmandu		Upload Photo Upload Photo
NP-KMC12-156	Shivalinga		Kathmandu Metropolis-12	Kathmandu		Upload Photo Upload Photo
NP-KMC12-157	Chaturbyuha Narayan Temple		Kathmandu Metropolis-12	Kathmandu		Upload Photo Upload Photo
NP-KMC12-158	Jalasayan Vishnu Temple		Kathmandu Metropolis-12	Kathmandu		Upload Photo Upload Photo
NP-KMC12-159	Badrinath		Kathmandu Metropolis-12	Kathmandu		Upload Photo Upload Photo
NP-KMC12-160	Rameshwar statue		Kathmandu Metropolis-12	Kathmandu		Upload Photo Upload Photo
NP-KMC12-161	Dwarikanath		Kathmandu Metropolis-12	Kathmandu		Upload Photo Upload Photo
NP-KMC12-162	Arytara statue		Kathmandu Metropolis-12	Kathmandu		Upload Photo Upload Photo
NP-KMC12-163	Triratna Buddha statue		Kathmandu Metropolis-12	Kathmandu		Upload Photo Upload Photo
NP-KMC12-164	Hanuman statue		Kathmandu Metropolis-12	Kathmandu		Hanuman statue Upload Photo
NP-KMC12-165	Siddhignesh		Kathmandu Metropolis-12	Kathmandu		Upload Photo Upload Photo
NP-KMC12-166	Shivalaya		Kathmandu Metropolis-12	Kathmandu		Upload Photo Upload Photo
NP-KMC12-167	Shiva Temple		Kathmandu Metropolis-12	Kathmandu		Shiva Temple Upload Photo
NP-KMC12-168	Bamvir Vikateshwar Mahadev		Kathmandu Metropolis-12	Kathmandu		Upload Photo Upload Photo
NP-KMC12-169	Shivalaya		Kathmandu Metropolis-12	Kathmandu		Upload Photo Upload Photo
NP-KMC12-170	Pachali Bhairav ?		Kathmandu Metropolis-12	Kathmandu		Pachali Bhairav ? Upload Photo
NP-KMC12-171	Pati		Kathmandu Metropolis-12	Kathmandu		Pati Upload Photo
NP-KMC12-172	Pati		Kathmandu Metropolis-12	Kathmandu		Upload Photo Upload Photo
NP-KMC12-173	Pati		Kathmandu Metropolis-12	Kathmandu		Upload Photo Upload Photo
NP-KMC12-174	Mahishasura Mardini idol		Kathmandu Metropolis-12	Kathmandu		Upload Photo Upload Photo
NP-KMC12-175	Shilapatra		Kathmandu Metropolis-12	Kathmandu		Upload Photo Upload Photo
NP-KMC12-176	Bhajan Sattal		Kathmandu Metropolis-12	Kathmandu		Bhajan Sattal Upload Photo
NP-KMC12-177	Hanuman temple		Kathmandu Metropolis-12	Kathmandu		Upload Photo Upload Photo
NP-KMC12-178	Ramjanki temple and Sattal		Kathmandu Metropolis-12	Kathmandu		Upload Photo Upload Photo
NP-KMC12-179	Chaitya		Kathmandu Metropolis-12	Kathmandu		Chaitya Upload Photo
NP-KMC12-180	Chaitya		Kathmandu Metropolis-12	Kathmandu		Upload Photo Upload Photo
NP-KMC12-181	Chaitya		Kathmandu Metropolis-12	Kathmandu		Upload Photo Upload Photo
NP-KMC12-182	Bsundhara		Kathmandu Metropolis-12	Kathmandu		Upload Photo Upload Photo
NP-KMC12-183	Shivalaya		Kathmandu Metropolis-12	Kathmandu		Upload Photo Upload Photo
NP-KMC12-184	Rameshwar Mahadev temple		Kathmandu Metropolis-12	Kathmandu		Upload Photo Upload Photo
NP-KMC12-185	Rameshwar Mahadev Mndir's Chaugera Sattal		Kathmandu Metropolis-12	Kathmandu		Upload Photo Upload Photo
NP-KMC12-186	Laxminarayan Sattal		Kathmandu Metropolis-12	Kathmandu		Upload Photo Upload Photo
NP-KMC12-187	Sattal		Kathmandu Metropolis-12	Kathmandu		Upload Photo Upload Photo
NP-KMC12-188	Geetagriha's Sattal		Kathmandu Metropolis-12	Kathmandu		Upload Photo Upload Photo
NP-KMC12-189	Satyabhama Rukmani including Krishna Statue		Kathmandu Metropolis-12	Kathmandu		Upload Photo Upload Photo
NP-KMC12-190	Shiva Parvati Statue		Kathmandu Metropolis-12	Kathmandu		Shiva Parvati Statue Upload Photo
NP-KMC12-191	Brahmayni Hansawahini statue		Kathmandu Metropolis-12	Kathmandu		Brahmayni Hansawahini statue Upload Photo
NP-KMC12-192	Maheshwar Brishbahini		Kathmandu Metropolis-12	Kathmandu		Maheshwar Brishbahini Upload Photo
NP-KMC12-193	Kaumari Mayurwahini Bhagawati		Kathmandu Metropolis-12	Kathmandu		Kaumari Mayurwahini Bhagawati Upload Photo
NP-KMC12-194	Vaishnavi Devi		Kathmandu Metropolis-12	Kathmandu		Vaishnavi Devi Upload Photo
NP-KMC12-195	Barahi Devi		Kathmandu Metropolis-12	Kathmandu		Barahi Devi Upload Photo
NP-KMC12-196	Indrayni Gajawahini statue		Kathmandu Metropolis-12	Kathmandu		Indrayni Gajawahini statue Upload Photo
NP-KMC12-197	Chamunda statue		Kathmandu Metropolis-12	Kathmandu		Chamunda statue Upload Photo
NP-KMC12-198	Mahalaxmi simhavahini		Kathmandu Metropolis-12	Kathmandu		Mahalaxmi simhavahini Upload Photo
NP-KMC12-199	Srijay Ambe Bhagawati		Kathmandu Metropolis-12	Kathmandu		Srijay Ambe Bhagawati Upload Photo
NP-KMC12-200	Matsya Awatar		Kathmandu Metropolis-12	Kathmandu		Upload Photo Upload Photo
NP-KMC12-201	Kurma awatar		Kathmandu Metropolis-12	Kathmandu		Upload Photo Upload Photo
NP-KMC12-202	Barah Awatar		Kathmandu Metropolis-12	Kathmandu		Upload Photo Upload Photo
NP-KMC12-203	Baman Awatar		Kathmandu Metropolis-12	Kathmandu		Upload Photo Upload Photo
NP-KMC12-204	Parasuram Awatar		Kathmandu Metropolis-12	Kathmandu		Upload Photo Upload Photo
NP-KMC12-205	Ram Awatar		Kathmandu Metropolis-12	Kathmandu		Upload Photo Upload Photo
NP-KMC12-206	Baladev Awatar		Kathmandu Metropolis-12	Kathmandu		Upload Photo Upload Photo
NP-KMC12-207	Buddha Awatar		Kathmandu Metropolis-12	Kathmandu		Upload Photo Upload Photo
NP-KMC12-208	Kalki Awatar		Kathmandu Metropolis-12	Kathmandu		Upload Photo Upload Photo
NP-KMC12-209	Ganesh Idol		Kathmandu Metropolis-12	Kathmandu		Upload Photo Upload Photo
NP-KMC12-210	Buddhawari Temple		Kathmandu Metropolis-12	Kathmandu		Upload Photo Upload Photo
NP-KMC12-211	Sattal Ramachandra temple		Kathmandu Metropolis-12	Kathmandu		Upload Photo Upload Photo
NP-KMC12-212	Ram Temple		Kathmandu Metropolis-12	Kathmandu		Upload Photo Upload Photo
NP-KMC12-213	Shilapatra		Kathmandu Metropolis-12	Kathmandu		Upload Photo Upload Photo
NP-KMC12-214	Shivalinga		Kathmandu Metropolis-12	Kathmandu		Upload Photo Upload Photo
NP-KMC12-215	Narayan Mandir		Kathmandu Metropolis-12	Kathmandu		Narayan Mandir Upload Photo
NP-KMC12-216	Garud statue		Kathmandu Metropolis-12	Kathmandu		Garud statue Upload Photo
NP-KMC12-217	Shilapatra		Kathmandu Metropolis-12	Kathmandu		Shilapatra Upload Photo
NP-KMC12-218	Shivalaya		Kathmandu Metropolis-12	Kathmandu		Shivalaya Upload Photo
NP-KMC12-219	Pote Devata		Kathmandu Metropolis-12	Kathmandu		Upload Photo Upload Photo
NP-KMC12-220	Ganesh		Kathmandu Metropolis-12	Kathmandu		Upload Photo Upload Photo
NP-KMC12-221	Stup		Kathmandu Metropolis-12	Kathmandu		Stup Upload Photo
NP-KMC12-222	Buddha statue		Kathmandu Metropolis-12	Kathmandu		Upload Photo Upload Photo
NP-KMC12-223	Amoghsiddhi		Kathmandu Metropolis-12	Kathmandu		Upload Photo Upload Photo
NP-KMC12-224	Gatekeeper Lion		Kathmandu Metropolis-12	Kathmandu		Upload Photo Upload Photo
NP-KMC12-225	Bajrabir Mahakal		Kathmandu Metropolis-12	Kathmandu		Upload Photo Upload Photo
NP-KMC12-226	Bajrabir Mahakal		Kathmandu Metropolis-12	Kathmandu		Upload Photo Upload Photo
NP-KMC12-227	Swete Chaitya		Kathmandu Metropolis-12	Kathmandu		Upload Photo Upload Photo
NP-KMC12-228	Kusha Bhagawati Temple		Kathmandu Metropolis-12	Kathmandu		Kusha Bhagawati Temple Upload Photo
NP-KMC12-229	Lion		Kathmandu Metropolis-12	Kathmandu		Upload Photo Upload Photo
NP-KMC12-230	Hyuamat Ghar		Kathmandu Metropolis-12	Kathmandu		Upload Photo Upload Photo
NP-KMC12-231	Bande Narayan Temple		Kathmandu Metropolis-12	Kathmandu		Upload Photo Upload Photo
NP-KMC12-232	Shivalaya		Kathmandu Metropolis-12	Kathmandu		Upload Photo Upload Photo
NP-KMC12-233	Ganesh Idol		Kathmandu Metropolis-12	Kathmandu		Upload Photo Upload Photo
NP-KMC12-234	Twachhe Bande Narayan Temple		Kathmandu Metropolis-12	Kathmandu		Upload Photo Upload Photo
NP-KMC12-235	Nrityanath		Kathmandu Metropolis-12	Kathmandu		Upload Photo Upload Photo
NP-KMC12-236	Pati		Kathmandu Metropolis-12	Kathmandu		Upload Photo Upload Photo
NP-KMC12-237	Saraswati		Kathmandu Metropolis-12	Kathmandu		Saraswati Upload Photo
NP-KMC12-238	Kusavahi		Kathmandu Metropolis-12	Kathmandu		Upload Photo Upload Photo

== See also ==
- List of Monuments in Bagmati Zone
- List of Monuments in Nepal
