= List of monuments in Bhaktapur, Nepal =

This is a list of monuments in Bhaktapur District, Nepal as officially recognized by and available through the website of the Department of Archaeology, Nepal.

Bhaktapur Durbar Square is the ancient royal palace of the old Bhaktapur Kingdom. There are numerous monuments in the square. Some of the monuments in this area are listed as world heritage sites of the UNESCO.

== List of monuments ==
ID	Name	Type	Location	District	Coordinates	Image
NP-BT-01	Bhaktapur Durbar Square		Bhaktapur Municipality	Bhaktapur	27°40′19″N 85°25′42″E	Bhaktapur Durbar Square Upload Photo
NP-BT-02	Mulchok		Bhaktapur Municipality	Bhaktapur		Upload Photo Upload Photo
NP-BT-03	Maltichok		Bhaktapur Municipality	Bhaktapur		Upload Photo Upload Photo
NP-BT-04	Dvibhajuchok		Bhaktapur Municipality	Bhaktapur		Upload Photo Upload Photo
NP-BT-05	Kumarichok		Bhaktapur Municipality	Bhaktapur		Upload Photo Upload Photo
NP-BT-06	Bhandarkhal chok		Bhaktapur Municipality	Bhaktapur		Bhandarkhal chok Upload Photo
NP-BT-07	Lunhiti chok		Bhaktapur Municipality	Bhaktapur		Upload Photo Upload Photo
NP-BT-08	Janhachok		Bhaktapur Municipality	Bhaktapur		Upload Photo Upload Photo
NP-BT-09	Yamadwarchok		Bhaktapur Municipality	Bhaktapur		Upload Photo Upload Photo
NP-BT-10	Mahadevchok		Bhaktapur Municipality	Bhaktapur		Upload Photo Upload Photo
NP-BT-11	Bhairavchok		Bhaktapur Municipality	Bhaktapur		Upload Photo Upload Photo
NP-BT-12	Vaikwachok		Bhaktapur Municipality	Bhaktapur		Upload Photo Upload Photo
NP-BT-13	Nrityashwar choke		Bhaktapur Municipality	Bhaktapur		Upload Photo Upload Photo
NP-BT-14	Lakshmibilas choke		Bhaktapur Municipality	Bhaktapur		Upload Photo Upload Photo
NP-BT-15	Tunhtichok		Bhaktapur Municipality	Bhaktapur		Upload Photo Upload Photo
NP-BT-16	Jiswanchok		Bhaktapur Municipality	Bhaktapur		Upload Photo Upload Photo
NP-BT-17	Pachpanna Jhyale Darbar (55 Windows Palace)		Bhaktapur Municipality	Bhaktapur	27°40′20″N 85°25′41″E	Pachpanna Jhyale Darbar (55 Windows Palace) Upload Photo
NP-BT-18	Lal Baithak		Bhaktapur Municipality	Bhaktapur	27°40′20″N 85°25′41″E	Lal Baithak Upload Photo
NP-BT-19	Suvarnadwar		Bhaktapur Municipality	Bhaktapur	27°40′19″N 85°25′42″E	Suvarnadwar Upload Photo
NP-BT-20	Ganeshchok		Bhaktapur Municipality	Bhaktapur		Upload Photo Upload Photo
NP-BT-21	Dathuchok		Bhaktapur Municipality	Bhaktapur		Upload Photo Upload Photo
NP-BT-22	Bhairabnath Temple		Bhaktapur Municipality	Bhaktapur	27°40′17″N 85°25′42″E	Bhairabnath Temple Upload Photo
NP-BT-23	Temple of Salanganesh		Bhaktapur Municipality	Bhaktapur	27°40′26″N 85°26′06″E	Temple of Salanganesh Upload Photo
NP-BT-24	Salanganesh Dyo Chhe		Bhaktapur Municipality	Bhaktapur	27°40′26″N 85°26′06″E	Upload Photo Upload Photo
NP-BT-25	Wane Layaku		Bhaktapur Municipality	Bhaktapur	27°40′19″N 85°25′42″E	Upload Photo Upload Photo
NP-BT-26	Dattatreya Temple		Bhaktapur Municipality	Bhaktapur	27°40′19″N 85°25′42″E	Dattatreya Temple Upload Photo
NP-BT-27	Narayan Mandir		Bhaktapur Municipality	Bhaktapur		Upload Photo Upload Photo
NP-BT-28	Bhimsen Temple		Bhaktapur Municipality	Bhaktapur		Bhimsen Temple Upload Photo
NP-BT-29	Dhungedhara		Bhaktapur Municipality	Bhaktapur		Dhungedhara Upload Photo
NP-BT-30	Nrityanath Temple (Nasha Dyo)		Bhaktapur Municipality	Bhaktapur	27°40′27″N 85°26′04″E	Upload Photo Upload Photo
NP-BT-31	Maheshwari Dyo Chhe		Bhaktapur Municipality	Bhaktapur		Upload Photo Upload Photo
NP-BT-32	Ganesh Dyo Chhe		Bhaktapur Municipality	Bhaktapur		Upload Photo Upload Photo
NP-BT-33	Indrasiddhi Vinayak		Bhaktapur Municipality	Bhaktapur		Upload Photo Upload Photo
NP-BT-34	Mahadev Temple		Bhaktapur Municipality	Bhaktapur		Mahadev Temple Upload Photo
NP-BT-35	Dhungedhara		Bhaktapur Municipality	Bhaktapur		Upload Photo Upload Photo
NP-BT-36	Temple of Umamaheshwar		Bhaktapur Municipality	Bhaktapur		Upload Photo Upload Photo
NP-BT-37	Dhungedhara		Bhaktapur Municipality	Bhaktapur		Upload Photo Upload Photo
NP-BT-38	Dhumawati		Bhaktapur Municipality	Bhaktapur		Upload Photo Upload Photo
NP-BT-39	Narayan Mandir		Bhaktapur Municipality	Bhaktapur		Upload Photo Upload Photo
NP-BT-40	Jangam Sattal		Bhaktapur Municipality	Bhaktapur		Upload Photo Upload Photo
NP-BT-41	Nyatapola (Natapol Dutra)		Bhaktapur Municipality	Bhaktapur	27°40′17″N 85°25′42″E	Nyatapola (Natapol Dutra) Upload Photo
NP-BT-42	Aisha - Marie Sattal (Aji Swanmadi)		Bhaktapur Municipality	Bhaktapur		Upload Photo Upload Photo
NP-BT-43	Temple of Bhairavnath		Bhaktapur Municipality	Bhaktapur	27°40′19″N 85°26′09″E	Temple of Bhairavnath Upload Photo
NP-BT-44	Chatuwarna Mahavihar (Ta Dhi Chhe )		Bhaktapur Municipality	Bhaktapur	27°40′19″N 85°25′45″E	Upload Photo Upload Photo
NP-BT-45	Hari Shankar Temple Sattal		Bhaktapur Municipality	Bhaktapur		Hari Shankar Temple Sattal Upload Photo
NP-BT-46	Shilu Mahadev		Bhaktapur Municipality	Bhaktapur		Shilu Mahadev Upload Photo
NP-BT-47	Narayan Mandir		Bhaktapur Municipality	Bhaktapur		Upload Photo Upload Photo
NP-BT-48	Watsaladevi Temple (Nrityeshwari and Nrityanath)		Bhaktapur Municipality	Bhaktapur	27°40′20″N 85°25′39″E	Watsaladevi Temple (Nrityeshwari and Nrityanath) Upload Photo
NP-BT-49	Temple of Yaksheshwar		Bhaktapur Municipality	Bhaktapur	27°40′20″N 85°25′39″E	Temple of Yaksheshwar Upload Photo
NP-BT-50	Siddhilakshmi Temple		Bhaktapur Municipality	Bhaktapur	27°40′19″N 85°25′43″E	Siddhilakshmi Temple Upload Photo
NP-BT-51	Dhungedhara		Bhaktapur Municipality	Bhaktapur		Upload Photo Upload Photo
NP-BT-52	Bhuptindra Malla Statue		Bhaktapur Municipality	Bhaktapur	27°40′19″N 85°25′42″E	Bhuptindra Malla Statue Upload Photo
NP-BT-53	Big Bell		Bhaktapur Municipality	Bhaktapur	27°40′19″N 85°25′41″E	Big Bell Upload Photo
NP-BT-54	Rameshwar Temple		Bhaktapur Municipality	Bhaktapur	27°40′20″N 85°25′39″E	Upload Photo Upload Photo
NP-BT-55	Radha Krishna Temple		Bhaktapur Municipality	Bhaktapur		Radha Krishna Temple Upload Photo
NP-BT-56	Khauma Wahaa: and Santanu Wahaa?		Bhaktapur Municipality	Bhaktapur		Upload Photo Upload Photo
NP-BT-57	Jaldroni		Bhaktapur Municipality	Bhaktapur		Upload Photo Upload Photo
NP-BT-58	Godavari Math		Bhaktapur Municipality	Bhaktapur		Upload Photo Upload Photo
NP-BT-59	Chikanappa Math		Bhaktapur Municipality	Bhaktapur		Upload Photo Upload Photo
NP-BT-60	Sukuldoka Math		Bhaktapur Municipality	Bhaktapur		Upload Photo Upload Photo
NP-BT-61	Jangam Math		Bhaktapur Municipality	Bhaktapur		Upload Photo Upload Photo
NP-BT-62	Sithu Dathu and Tajaa Maths		Bhaktapur Municipality	Bhaktapur		Upload Photo Upload Photo
NP-BT-63	Pujari Math		Bhaktapur Municipality	Bhaktapur		Pujari Math Upload Photo
NP-BT-64	Pulanchotta Math		Bhaktapur Municipality	Bhaktapur		Upload Photo Upload Photo
NP-BT-65	Tilamadhav Narayan Temple		Bhaktapur Municipality	Bhaktapur	27°40′15″N 85°25′45″E	Tilamadhav Narayan Temple Upload Photo
NP-BT-66	MulGhar (Yachhe)		Bhaktapur Municipality	Bhaktapur		Upload Photo Upload Photo
NP-BT-67	Sikhwal Family Home		Bhaktapur Municipality	Bhaktapur		Upload Photo Upload Photo
NP-BT-68	Mahadevsthan		Bhaktapur Municipality	Bhaktapur		Upload Photo Upload Photo
NP-BT-69	Dhungedhara		Bhaktapur Municipality	Bhaktapur		Upload Photo Upload Photo
NP-BT-70	Balkumari		Bhaktapur Municipality	Bhaktapur	27°40′13″N 85°25′48″E	Upload Photo Upload Photo
NP-BT-71	Slanganesh Pokhari		Bhaktapur Municipality	Bhaktapur		Upload Photo Upload Photo
NP-BT-72	Dhungedhara		Bhaktapur Municipality	Bhaktapur		Upload Photo Upload Photo
NP-BT-73	Jangam Pati		Bhaktapur Municipality	Bhaktapur		Upload Photo Upload Photo
NP-BT-74	Bhote Baha		Bhaktapur Municipality	Bhaktapur		Upload Photo Upload Photo
NP-BT-75	Dhungedhara		Bhaktapur Municipality	Bhaktapur		Upload Photo Upload Photo
NP-BT-76	Dhungedhara		Bhaktapur Municipality	Bhaktapur		Upload Photo Upload Photo
NP-BT-77	Mahankal Bhaildyofalcha		Bhaktapur Municipality	Bhaktapur		Upload Photo Upload Photo
NP-BT-78	Chaitya (Chiba?)		Bhaktapur Municipality	Bhaktapur		Upload Photo Upload Photo
NP-BT-79	Golmadi Pati		Bhaktapur Municipality	Bhaktapur		Upload Photo Upload Photo
NP-BT-80	Narayan Mandir		Bhaktapur Municipality	Bhaktapur	27°40′14″N 85°25′44″E	Upload Photo Upload Photo
NP-BT-81	Bhimsen Temple		Bhaktapur Municipality	Bhaktapur		Upload Photo Upload Photo
NP-BT-82	Naraynsthan		Bhaktapur Municipality	Bhaktapur		Upload Photo Upload Photo
NP-BT-83	Bulbul Hiti(Gupuhiti)		Bhaktapur Municipality	Bhaktapur		Upload Photo Upload Photo
NP-BT-84	Jaldenu (Balakhu)		Bhaktapur Municipality	Bhaktapur		Upload Photo Upload Photo
NP-BT-85	Jagannath Temple		Bhaktapur Municipality	Bhaktapur		Jagannath Temple Upload Photo
NP-BT-86	TripurasundarI Dyo Chhe		Bhaktapur Municipality	Bhaktapur		TripurasundarI Dyo Chhe Upload Photo
NP-BT-87	Chaturnarayan		Bhaktapur Municipality	Bhaktapur		Upload Photo Upload Photo
NP-BT-88	Tripur Vidhyapith Agam		Bhaktapur Municipality	Bhaktapur		Upload Photo Upload Photo
NP-BT-89	Pahache Pati		Bhaktapur Municipality	Bhaktapur		Upload Photo Upload Photo
NP-BT-90	Walakhu Ganesh		Bhaktapur Municipality	Bhaktapur		Upload Photo Upload Photo
NP-BT-91	Shiva Temple		Bhaktapur Municipality	Bhaktapur		Shiva Temple Upload Photo
NP-BT-92	Shiva Temple		Bhaktapur Municipality	Bhaktapur		Shiva Temple Upload Photo
NP-BT-93	Kumari Temple		Bhaktapur Municipality	Bhaktapur	27°40′13″N 85°25′48″E	Upload Photo Upload Photo
NP-BT-94	Four Ganesh around Nyatapola		Bhaktapur Municipality	Bhaktapur		Four Ganesh around Nyatapola Upload Photo
NP-BT-95	Umamaheshwar Sthan		Bhaktapur Municipality	Bhaktapur		Upload Photo Upload Photo
NP-BT-96	Lon Hiti and Navagraha		Bhaktapur Municipality	Bhaktapur		Upload Photo Upload Photo
NP-BT-97	Wetal Pati		Bhaktapur Municipality	Bhaktapur		Upload Photo Upload Photo
NP-BT-98	Dattatreya Temple		Bhaktapur Municipality	Bhaktapur		Upload Photo Upload Photo
NP-BT-99	Annapurna (Siddhilakshmi)		Bhaktapur Municipality	Bhaktapur		Upload Photo Upload Photo
NP-BT-100	Narayan Mandir		Bhaktapur Municipality	Bhaktapur		Narayan Mandir Upload Photo
NP-BT-101	Ganesh Temple		Bhaktapur Municipality	Bhaktapur		Upload Photo Upload Photo
NP-BT-102	Jaladhenu (Jaldroni)		Bhaktapur Municipality	Bhaktapur		Upload Photo Upload Photo
NP-BT-103	Temple of Umamaheshwar		Bhaktapur Municipality	Bhaktapur		Upload Photo Upload Photo
NP-BT-104	Wardali Math		Bhaktapur Municipality	Bhaktapur		Upload Photo Upload Photo
NP-BT-105	Bhimsen Sattal		Bhaktapur Municipality	Bhaktapur		Upload Photo Upload Photo
NP-BT-106	Vikalprasad Shrestha's Home		Bhaktapur Municipality	Bhaktapur		Upload Photo Upload Photo
NP-BT-107	Golden Karmacharya's Home		Bhaktapur Municipality	Bhaktapur		Upload Photo Upload Photo
NP-BT-108	Ashtalakshmi Shakya's Home		Bhaktapur Municipality	Bhaktapur		Upload Photo Upload Photo
NP-BT-109	Krishnagopal Joshi's Home		Bhaktapur Municipality	Bhaktapur		Upload Photo Upload Photo
NP-BT-110	Pu?vaha		Bhaktapur Municipality	Bhaktapur		Upload Photo Upload Photo
NP-BT-111	Sakulan Pati		Bhaktapur Municipality	Bhaktapur		Upload Photo Upload Photo
NP-BT-112	Inacho Pati		Bhaktapur Municipality	Bhaktapur		Upload Photo Upload Photo
NP-BT-113	Mahadevsthan		Bhaktapur Municipality	Bhaktapur		Upload Photo Upload Photo
NP-BT-114	TripurasundarI Pith		Bhaktapur Municipality	Bhaktapur		Upload Photo Upload Photo
NP-BT-115	Jaladroni Inar		Bhaktapur Municipality	Bhaktapur		Upload Photo Upload Photo
NP-BT-116	Gupuhiti		Bhaktapur Municipality	Bhaktapur		Upload Photo Upload Photo
NP-BT-117	Narasimha Temple		Bhaktapur Municipality	Bhaktapur		Upload Photo Upload Photo
NP-BT-118	Dabali (Bhimsen Dabali Nasmana Dabali and Taumadi Dabali)		Bhaktapur Municipality	Bhaktapur		Dabali (Bhimsen Dabali Nasmana Dabali and Taumadi Dabali) Upload Photo
NP-BT-119	Bhubaneswari		Bhaktapur Municipality	Bhaktapur		Upload Photo Upload Photo
NP-BT-120	Chyamain Pavilion		Bhaktapur Municipality	Bhaktapur		Upload Photo Upload Photo
NP-BT-121	Itta Chapali (Sattal)		Bhaktapur Municipality	Bhaktapur		Upload Photo Upload Photo
NP-BT-122	Badrinath Temple		Bhaktapur Municipality	Bhaktapur	27°40′20″N 85°25′39″E	Badrinath Temple Upload Photo
NP-BT-123	Jagannath Temple		Bhaktapur Municipality	Bhaktapur		Upload Photo Upload Photo
NP-BT-124	Dhanavinayak Ganesh		Bhaktapur Municipality	Bhaktapur		Upload Photo Upload Photo
NP-BT-125	Dhungedhara		Bhaktapur Municipality	Bhaktapur		Upload Photo Upload Photo
NP-BT-126	Indrayani Temple (Dya Chhen)		Bhaktapur Municipality	Bhaktapur	27°40′21″N 85°25′37″E	Upload Photo Upload Photo
NP-BT-127	Uma Maheshwar		Bhaktapur Municipality	Bhaktapur		Upload Photo Upload Photo
NP-BT-128	Indrayni Pith		Bhaktapur Municipality	Bhaktapur		Upload Photo Upload Photo
NP-BT-129	Jhaurvahi (Dipankar Vihar)		Bhaktapur Municipality	Bhaktapur		Upload Photo Upload Photo
NP-BT-130	Narayan Mandir		Bhaktapur Municipality	Bhaktapur		Upload Photo Upload Photo
NP-BT-131	Narayan Mandir		Bhaktapur Municipality	Bhaktapur		Upload Photo Upload Photo
NP-BT-132	Guruju Priwarko Home		Bhaktapur Municipality	Bhaktapur		Upload Photo Upload Photo
NP-BT-133	Indraprasad Jhonchhe's Home		Bhaktapur Municipality	Bhaktapur		Upload Photo Upload Photo
NP-BT-134	Tulsibhakta Prdhananga's Home		Bhaktapur Municipality	Bhaktapur		Upload Photo Upload Photo
NP-BT-135	Dandapani Vaidya's Home		Bhaktapur Municipality	Bhaktapur		Upload Photo Upload Photo
NP-BT-136	Gopal Bhoju's Home		Bhaktapur Municipality	Bhaktapur		Upload Photo Upload Photo
NP-BT-137	Pitambar Karmacharya's Home		Bhaktapur Municipality	Bhaktapur		Upload Photo Upload Photo
NP-BT-138	Manandhar Priwar's Home		Bhaktapur Municipality	Bhaktapur		Upload Photo Upload Photo
NP-BT-139	Govind Malla including Mahesh Malla's Home		Bhaktapur Municipality	Bhaktapur		Upload Photo Upload Photo
NP-BT-140	Belbhakta Joshi's Home		Bhaktapur Municipality	Bhaktapur		Upload Photo Upload Photo
NP-BT-141	Shivprasad Vaidya's Home		Bhaktapur Municipality	Bhaktapur		Upload Photo Upload Photo
NP-BT-142	Mahendralal Yach's Home		Bhaktapur Municipality	Bhaktapur		Upload Photo Upload Photo
NP-BT-143	AshaRam Dwaju's Home		Bhaktapur Municipality	Bhaktapur		Upload Photo Upload Photo
NP-BT-144	Unknown Person's Home		Bhaktapur Municipality	Bhaktapur		Upload Photo Upload Photo
NP-BT-145	Hada Priwar's Home		Bhaktapur Municipality	Bhaktapur		Upload Photo Upload Photo
NP-BT-146	Radio Baje's Home		Bhaktapur Municipality	Bhaktapur		Upload Photo Upload Photo
NP-BT-147	Unknown Person's Home		Bhaktapur Municipality	Bhaktapur		Upload Photo Upload Photo
NP-BT-148	Unknown Person's Home		Bhaktapur Municipality	Bhaktapur		Upload Photo Upload Photo
NP-BT-149	Ratnraj Rajopadhya's Home		Bhaktapur Municipality	Bhaktapur		Upload Photo Upload Photo
NP-BT-150	Rajopadyays' Agamchhen		Bhaktapur Municipality	Bhaktapur		Upload Photo Upload Photo
NP-BT-151	Unknown Person's Home		Bhaktapur Municipality	Bhaktapur		Upload Photo Upload Photo
NP-BT-152	Baje's Home		Bhaktapur Municipality	Bhaktapur		Upload Photo Upload Photo
NP-BT-153	Siddha Pokhari (Ta Pukhu)		Bhaktapur Municipality	Bhaktapur	27°40′18″N 85°25′12″E	Siddha Pokhari (Ta Pukhu) Upload Photo

== See also ==
- List of monuments in Bagmati Province
- List of monuments in Nepal
