= List of monuments in Kavrepalanchok, Nepal =

This is a list of monuments in Kavrepalanchok District, Nepal as officially recognized by and available through the Department of Archaeology, Nepal. Kavrepalanchok is a district of Bagmati Province and is located in central Nepal.

== List of monuments ==
ID	Name	Type	Location	District	Coordinates	Image
NP-KAB-01	Kaaryavinayak Temple			Kabhrepalanchok		Upload Photo Upload Photo
NP-KAB-02	Namobuddha stupa		Namobuddha	Kabhrepalanchok	27°34′16″N 85°34′49″E	Namobuddha stupa Upload Photo
NP-KAB-03	Palanchok Bhagawati Temple		Panchkhal Municipality	Kabhrepalanchok	27°37′44″N 85°40′19″E	Palanchok Bhagawati Temple Upload Photo
NP-KAB-04	Dhaneshwor Temple		Panauti	Kabhrepalanchok	27°37′05″N 85°31′13″E	Dhaneshwor Temple Upload Photo
NP-KAB-05	Panauti Temple square			Kabhrepalanchok	27°35′05″N 85°29′18″E	Panauti Temple square Upload Photo
NP-KAB-06	Gokuleshwor Temple			Kabhrepalanchok		Upload Photo Upload Photo
NP-KAB-07	Naranthan Temple			Kabhrepalanchok		Upload Photo Upload Photo
NP-KAB-08	Kali temple			Kabhrepalanchok	27°36′38″N 85°33′57″E	Upload Photo Upload Photo

== See also ==
- List of monuments in Nepal
- List of monuments in Bagmati Province
