= List of monuments in Metropolis 15, Kathmandu =

This is a list of Monuments in Kathmandu Metropolis -15, officially recognized by and available through the website of the Department of Archaeology, Nepal in the Kathmandu District. Kathmandu is a historically rich city and Hindu temples are the main attraction of this Metropolis. The monument list below is populated using the authentic information at Department of Archaeology.

== List of Monuments ==
ID	Name	Type	Location	District	Coordinates	Image
NP-KMC15-01	Temple of Vijeshwari		Kathmandu Metropolis-15	Kathmandu		Temple of Vijeshwari Upload Photo
NP-KMC15-02	Chaityas		Kathmandu Metropolis-15	Kathmandu		Chaityas Upload Photo
NP-KMC15-03	Lokeshwor		Kathmandu Metropolis-15	Kathmandu		Lokeshwor Upload Photo
NP-KMC15-04	Shadkhsyari		Kathmandu Metropolis-15	Kathmandu		Shadkhsyari Upload Photo
NP-KMC15-05	Shadkhsyari		Kathmandu Metropolis-15	Kathmandu		Shadkhsyari Upload Photo
NP-KMC15-06	Window with Toran		Kathmandu Metropolis-15	Kathmandu		Window with Toran Upload Photo
NP-KMC15-07	Dewali Sthan		Kathmandu Metropolis-15	Kathmandu		Dewali Sthan Upload Photo
NP-KMC15-08	Sukhawati lokeshwor		Kathmandu Metropolis-15	Kathmandu		Upload Photo Upload Photo
NP-KMC15-09	Chaturmuki Shivalinga		Kathmandu Metropolis-15	Kathmandu		Upload Photo Upload Photo
NP-KMC15-10	Balram statue		Kathmandu Metropolis-15	Kathmandu		Upload Photo Upload Photo
NP-KMC15-11	Shadkhsyari		Kathmandu Metropolis-15	Kathmandu		Upload Photo Upload Photo
NP-KMC15-12	Lakshmi		Kathmandu Metropolis-15	Kathmandu		Lakshmi Upload Photo
NP-KMC15-13	Shivalaya		Kathmandu Metropolis-15	Kathmandu		Shivalaya Upload Photo
NP-KMC15-14	Pati		Kathmandu Metropolis-15	Kathmandu		Upload Photo Upload Photo
NP-KMC15-15	Shivalinga		Kathmandu Metropolis-15	Kathmandu		Shivalinga Upload Photo
NP-KMC15-16	Padmapani lokeswor		Kathmandu Metropolis-15	Kathmandu		Upload Photo Upload Photo
NP-KMC15-17	Padmapani lokeswor Deval		Kathmandu Metropolis-15	Kathmandu		Upload Photo Upload Photo
NP-KMC15-18	Ganesh Deval		Kathmandu Metropolis-15	Kathmandu		Upload Photo Upload Photo
NP-KMC15-19	Manjusri Deval		Kathmandu Metropolis-15	Kathmandu		Upload Photo Upload Photo
NP-KMC15-20	Mahakal Deval statue		Kathmandu Metropolis-15	Kathmandu		Upload Photo Upload Photo
NP-KMC15-21	Pati		Kathmandu Metropolis-15	Kathmandu		Pati Upload Photo
NP-KMC15-22	Bajradhatu Chaitya		Kathmandu Metropolis-15	Kathmandu		Upload Photo Upload Photo
NP-KMC15-23	Tinkavale Pati		Kathmandu Metropolis-15	Kathmandu		Upload Photo Upload Photo
NP-KMC15-24	Mahamaheshwari statuesqueness		Kathmandu Metropolis-15	Kathmandu		Upload Photo Upload Photo
NP-KMC15-25	Ganesh		Kathmandu Metropolis-15	Kathmandu		Ganesh Upload Photo
NP-KMC15-26	Sobha Bhagawati Temple		Kathmandu Metropolis-15	Kathmandu		Sobha Bhagawati Temple Upload Photo
NP-KMC15-27	Sobha Bhagawati		Kathmandu Metropolis-15	Kathmandu		Sobha Bhagawati Upload Photo
NP-KMC15-28	Pati behind Sobhaa Bhagwati Temple		Kathmandu Metropolis-15	Kathmandu		Pati behind Sobhaa Bhagwati Temple Upload Photo
NP-KMC15-29	Bhajan Pati		Kathmandu Metropolis-15	Kathmandu		Bhajan Pati Upload Photo
NP-KMC15-30	Mahavishnu Temple		Kathmandu Metropolis-15	Kathmandu		Upload Photo Upload Photo
NP-KMC15-31	Chaitya		Kathmandu Metropolis-15	Kathmandu		Chaitya Upload Photo
NP-KMC15-32	Chaitya		Kathmandu Metropolis-15	Kathmandu		Chaitya Upload Photo
NP-KMC15-33	Dhungedhara		Kathmandu Metropolis-15	Kathmandu		Dhungedhara Upload Photo
NP-KMC15-34	Shivalaya		Kathmandu Metropolis-15	Kathmandu		Shivalaya Upload Photo
NP-KMC15-35	Bhimsen Sthan		Kathmandu Metropolis-15	Kathmandu		Bhimsen Sthan Upload Photo
NP-KMC15-36	Bhuikel Dhungedhara and Pokhari		Kathmandu Metropolis-15	Kathmandu		Bhuikel Dhungedhara and Pokhari Upload Photo
NP-KMC15-37	Chaitya		Kathmandu Metropolis-15	Kathmandu		Upload Photo Upload Photo
NP-KMC15-38	Bhimsen Deval		Kathmandu Metropolis-15	Kathmandu		Bhimsen Deval Upload Photo
NP-KMC15-39	Akhshyovya Temple		Kathmandu Metropolis-15	Kathmandu		Akhshyovya Temple Upload Photo
NP-KMC15-40	Swyambhu Kimdol Bihar		Kathmandu Metropolis-15	Kathmandu		Swyambhu Kimdol Bihar Upload Photo
NP-KMC15-41	Swayambhunath		Kathmandu Metropolis-15	Kathmandu		Upload Photo Upload Photo

== See also ==
- List of Monuments in Bagmati Zone
- List of Monuments in Nepal
