= List of monuments in Metropolis 17, Kathmandu =

This is a list of Monuments in Kathmandu Metropolis -17, officially recognized by and available through the website of the Department of Archaeology, Nepal in the Kathmandu District. Kathmandu is a historically rich city and Hindu temples are the main attraction of this Metropolis. The monument list below is populated using the authentic information at Department of Archaeology.

== List of Monuments ==
ID	Name	Type	Location	District	Coordinates	Image
NP-KMC17-01	Bajradhatu Chaitya		Kathmandu Metropolis-17	Kathmandu		Upload Photo Upload Photo
NP-KMC17-02	Nrityeshwar Than Temple		Kathmandu Metropolis-17	Kathmandu		Upload Photo Upload Photo
NP-KMC17-03	Pati		Kathmandu Metropolis-17	Kathmandu		Upload Photo Upload Photo
NP-KMC17-04	Ganesh Sthan		Kathmandu Metropolis-17	Kathmandu		Upload Photo Upload Photo
NP-KMC17-05	Bhagawati Sthan		Kathmandu Metropolis-17	Kathmandu		Upload Photo Upload Photo
NP-KMC17-06	Pati		Kathmandu Metropolis-17	Kathmandu		Upload Photo Upload Photo
NP-KMC17-07	Digi Chhe		Kathmandu Metropolis-17	Kathmandu		Upload Photo Upload Photo
NP-KMC17-08	Maitripur Mahavihar		Kathmandu Metropolis-17	Kathmandu		Upload Photo Upload Photo
NP-KMC17-09	Chaitya		Kathmandu Metropolis-17	Kathmandu		Upload Photo Upload Photo
NP-KMC17-10	Ganesh Temple		Kathmandu Metropolis-17	Kathmandu		Ganesh Temple Upload Photo
NP-KMC17-11	Pati		Kathmandu Metropolis-17	Kathmandu		Upload Photo Upload Photo
NP-KMC17-12	Chaitya		Kathmandu Metropolis-17	Kathmandu		Upload Photo Upload Photo
NP-KMC17-13	Saraswati Sthan		Kathmandu Metropolis-17	Kathmandu		Saraswati Sthan Upload Photo
NP-KMC17-14	Sweta Bhairav Nath Temple		Kathmandu Metropolis-17	Kathmandu		Sweta Bhairav Nath Temple Upload Photo
NP-KMC17-15	Stone Inscription		Kathmandu Metropolis-17	Kathmandu		Upload Photo Upload Photo
NP-KMC17-16	Umamaheshwar Statue and Shilapatra		Kathmandu Metropolis-17	Kathmandu		Upload Photo Upload Photo
NP-KMC17-17	Dhungedhara		Kathmandu Metropolis-17	Kathmandu		Upload Photo Upload Photo
NP-KMC17-18	Dhungedhara		Kathmandu Metropolis-17	Kathmandu		Upload Photo Upload Photo
NP-KMC17-19	Dhungedhara		Kathmandu Metropolis-17	Kathmandu		Upload Photo Upload Photo
NP-KMC17-20	Dhungedhara		Kathmandu Metropolis-17	Kathmandu		Upload Photo Upload Photo
NP-KMC17-21	Sattal		Kathmandu Metropolis-17	Kathmandu		Upload Photo Upload Photo
NP-KMC17-22	Chaitya		Kathmandu Metropolis-17	Kathmandu		Upload Photo Upload Photo
NP-KMC17-23	Chaitya		Kathmandu Metropolis-17	Kathmandu		Upload Photo Upload Photo
NP-KMC17-24	Bhunde Ganesh		Kathmandu Metropolis-17	Kathmandu		Upload Photo Upload Photo
NP-KMC17-25	Indrayani Sattal		Kathmandu Metropolis-17	Kathmandu		Upload Photo Upload Photo
NP-KMC17-26	Chaitya		Kathmandu Metropolis-17	Kathmandu		Upload Photo Upload Photo
NP-KMC17-27	Indrayani Temple		Kathmandu Metropolis-17	Kathmandu		Upload Photo Upload Photo
NP-KMC17-28	Dharmadhatu Chaitya		Kathmandu Metropolis-17	Kathmandu		Upload Photo Upload Photo
NP-KMC17-29	Terracotta Chaitya		Kathmandu Metropolis-17	Kathmandu		Upload Photo Upload Photo
NP-KMC17-30	Chaitya		Kathmandu Metropolis-17	Kathmandu		Upload Photo Upload Photo
NP-KMC17-31	Pati		Kathmandu Metropolis-17	Kathmandu		Upload Photo Upload Photo
NP-KMC17-32	Pati		Kathmandu Metropolis-17	Kathmandu		Upload Photo Upload Photo
NP-KMC17-33	Narendrashwar Shivalaya		Kathmandu Metropolis-17	Kathmandu		Upload Photo Upload Photo
NP-KMC17-34	Ghat Sattal		Kathmandu Metropolis-17	Kathmandu		Upload Photo Upload Photo
NP-KMC17-35	Shivalaya		Kathmandu Metropolis-17	Kathmandu		Upload Photo Upload Photo

== See also ==
- List of Monuments in Bagmati Zone
- List of Monuments in Nepal
