= List of monuments in Metropolis 2, Kathmandu =

This is a list of Monuments in Kathmandu Metropolis -2, officially recognized by and available through the website of the Department of Archaeology, Nepal in the Kathmandu District. Kathmandu is historically rich city. Hindu temples are the main attraction of this Metropolis.

== List of Monuments ==
ID	Name	Type	Location	District	Coordinates	Image
NP-KMC02-01	Nil Saraswati temple		Kathmandu Metropolis-02	Kathmandu		Nil Saraswati temple Upload Photo
NP-KMC02-02	Dayashwar Mahadev temple		Kathmandu Metropolis-02	Kathmandu		Dayashwar Mahadev temple Upload Photo
NP-KMC02-03	Dayashwar Shivalinga		Kathmandu Metropolis-02	Kathmandu		Dayashwar Shivalinga Upload Photo
NP-KMC02-04	Nrisimha and other four statues		Kathmandu Metropolis-02	Kathmandu		Upload Photo Upload Photo
NP-KMC02-05	Ganesh Statue and Pote Devata Statue		Kathmandu Metropolis-02	Kathmandu		Ganesh Statue and Pote Devata Statue Upload Photo
NP-KMC02-06	Dikpal Bhairav Statue		Kathmandu Metropolis-02	Kathmandu		Upload Photo Upload Photo
NP-KMC02-07	Chaitya		Kathmandu Metropolis-02	Kathmandu		Upload Photo Upload Photo
NP-KMC02-08	Saraswati statue		Kathmandu Metropolis-02	Kathmandu		Upload Photo Upload Photo
NP-KMC02-09	Ganesh Idol		Kathmandu Metropolis-02	Kathmandu		Ganesh Idol Upload Photo
NP-KMC02-10	Garud statue		Kathmandu Metropolis-02	Kathmandu		Upload Photo Upload Photo
NP-KMC02-11	Lakshminarayan statue		Kathmandu Metropolis-02	Kathmandu		Upload Photo Upload Photo
NP-KMC02-12	Chaitya		Kathmandu Metropolis-02	Kathmandu		Chaitya Upload Photo
NP-KMC02-13	Toran Statue		Kathmandu Metropolis-02	Kathmandu		Upload Photo Upload Photo
NP-KMC02-14	Hanuman statue		Kathmandu Metropolis-02	Kathmandu		Hanuman statue Upload Photo
NP-KMC02-15	Bangalamukhi statue		Kathmandu Metropolis-02	Kathmandu		Bangalamukhi statue Upload Photo
NP-KMC02-16	Bhimsen statue		Kathmandu Metropolis-02	Kathmandu		Bhimsen statue Upload Photo
NP-KMC02-17	Mahishasur Mardini idol		Kathmandu Metropolis-02	Kathmandu		Upload Photo Upload Photo
NP-KMC02-18	Shivalinga		Kathmandu Metropolis-02	Kathmandu		Shivalinga Upload Photo

== See also ==
- List of Monuments in Bagmati Zone
- List of Monuments in Nepal
