= List of monuments in Metropolis 6, Kathmandu =

This is a list of monuments in Kathmandu Metropolis -6, officially recognized by and available through the website of the Department of Archaeology, Nepal in the Kathmandu District. Kathmandu is a historically rich city and Hindu temples are the main attraction of the area. The monument list below is populated using the authentic information at Department of Archaeology.

== List of monuments ==
ID	Name	Type	Location	District	Coordinates	Image
NP-KMC06-01	Baneshwar Bachaspatindreswar		Kathmandu Metropolis-06	Kathmandu		Upload Photo Upload Photo
NP-KMC06-02	Baneshwar Sattal		Kathmandu Metropolis-06	Kathmandu		Upload Photo Upload Photo
NP-KMC06-03	Mahankal Bhairav ??		Kathmandu Metropolis-06	Kathmandu		Upload Photo Upload Photo
NP-KMC06-04	Nardeshwar Mahadev temple and Sattal		Kathmandu Metropolis-06	Kathmandu		Upload Photo Upload Photo
NP-KMC06-05	Ram Hiti		Kathmandu Metropolis-06	Kathmandu		Upload Photo Upload Photo
NP-KMC06-06	Radha Rukmani Krishna Statue		Kathmandu Metropolis-06	Kathmandu		Upload Photo Upload Photo
NP-KMC06-07	Lakshmishwar Mahadev Pati		Kathmandu Metropolis-06	Kathmandu		Upload Photo Upload Photo
NP-KMC06-08	Hiti Dhara		Kathmandu Metropolis-06	Kathmandu		Upload Photo Upload Photo
NP-KMC06-09	Boudhanath		Kathmandu Metropolis-06	Kathmandu		Boudhanath Upload Photo

== See also ==
- List of monuments in Bagmati Zone
- List of monuments in Nepal
