= List of monuments in Metropolis 13, Kathmandu =

This is a list of Monuments in Kathmandu Metropolis -13, officially recognized by and available through the website of the Department of Archaeology, Nepal in the Kathmandu District. Kathmandu is a historically rich city and Hindu temples are the main attraction of this Metropolis. The monument list below is populated using the authentic information at Department of Archaeology.

== List of Monuments ==
ID	Name	Type	Location	District	Coordinates	Image
NP-KMC13-01	Bhimmukteshwor Shivalaya		Kathmandu Metropolis-13	Kathmandu		Upload Photo Upload Photo
NP-KMC13-02	Kritimukh Bhairav		Kathmandu Metropolis-13	Kathmandu		Upload Photo Upload Photo
NP-KMC13-03	Basaha		Kathmandu Metropolis-13	Kathmandu		Upload Photo Upload Photo
NP-KMC13-04	Sattal		Kathmandu Metropolis-13	Kathmandu		Upload Photo Upload Photo
NP-KMC13-05	Stone Inscription		Kathmandu Metropolis-13	Kathmandu		Upload Photo Upload Photo
NP-KMC13-06	Shilamandap		Kathmandu Metropolis-13	Kathmandu		Upload Photo Upload Photo
NP-KMC13-07	Chhatra Chandeshwar statue		Kathmandu Metropolis-13	Kathmandu		Upload Photo Upload Photo
NP-KMC13-08	Sattal		Kathmandu Metropolis-13	Kathmandu		Upload Photo Upload Photo
NP-KMC13-09	Ganesh statue		Kathmandu Metropolis-13	Kathmandu		Upload Photo Upload Photo
NP-KMC13-10	Bagawati statuesqueness		Kathmandu Metropolis-13	Kathmandu		Upload Photo Upload Photo
NP-KMC13-11	Vishnu statue		Kathmandu Metropolis-13	Kathmandu		Upload Photo Upload Photo
NP-KMC13-12	Pati		Kathmandu Metropolis-13	Kathmandu		Upload Photo Upload Photo
NP-KMC13-13	Pati		Kathmandu Metropolis-13	Kathmandu		Upload Photo Upload Photo
NP-KMC13-14	Sattal		Kathmandu Metropolis-13	Kathmandu		Upload Photo Upload Photo
NP-KMC13-15	Mahamukteshwar Temple		Kathmandu Metropolis-13	Kathmandu		Upload Photo Upload Photo
NP-KMC13-16	Mahamukteshwar Shivalinga		Kathmandu Metropolis-13	Kathmandu		Upload Photo Upload Photo
NP-KMC13-17	Jalasayan Narayan Temple		Kathmandu Metropolis-13	Kathmandu		Upload Photo Upload Photo
NP-KMC13-18	Jalasayan Vishnu statue		Kathmandu Metropolis-13	Kathmandu		Upload Photo Upload Photo
NP-KMC13-19	Ganesh Sthan		Kathmandu Metropolis-13	Kathmandu		Upload Photo Upload Photo
NP-KMC13-20	Pati Ruins		Kathmandu Metropolis-13	Kathmandu		Upload Photo Upload Photo
NP-KMC13-21	Tankeshhwar Shivalaya		Kathmandu Metropolis-13	Kathmandu		Upload Photo Upload Photo
NP-KMC13-22	Ram and Krishna Deval		Kathmandu Metropolis-13	Kathmandu		Upload Photo Upload Photo
NP-KMC13-23	Tankeshhwar Sattal		Kathmandu Metropolis-13	Kathmandu		Upload Photo Upload Photo
NP-KMC13-24	Dharmdhatu Chaitya		Kathmandu Metropolis-13	Kathmandu		Upload Photo Upload Photo
NP-KMC13-25	Various Devdevi Statues		Kathmandu Metropolis-13	Kathmandu		Upload Photo Upload Photo
NP-KMC13-26	Dewali Sthan		Kathmandu Metropolis-13	Kathmandu		Upload Photo Upload Photo
NP-KMC13-27	Takati Ajima (Warahi place)		Kathmandu Metropolis-13	Kathmandu		Upload Photo Upload Photo
NP-KMC13-28	Sattal		Kathmandu Metropolis-13	Kathmandu		Upload Photo Upload Photo
NP-KMC13-29	Pati		Kathmandu Metropolis-13	Kathmandu		Upload Photo Upload Photo
NP-KMC13-30	Ajima Deval		Kathmandu Metropolis-13	Kathmandu		Upload Photo Upload Photo
NP-KMC13-31	Aju Bhairav ??Deval		Kathmandu Metropolis-13	Kathmandu		Upload Photo Upload Photo
NP-KMC13-32	Khusi Wahil Entrance		Kathmandu Metropolis-13	Kathmandu		Upload Photo Upload Photo
NP-KMC13-33	Khusi Wahil		Kathmandu Metropolis-13	Kathmandu		Upload Photo Upload Photo

== See also ==
- List of Monuments in Bagmati Zone
- List of Monuments in Nepal
