= List of monuments in Metropolis 1, Kathmandu =

This is a list of Monuments in Kathmandu Metropolis -1, officially recognized by and available through the website of the Department of Archaeology, Nepal in the Kathmandu District. Kathmandu is a historically rich city and Hindu temples are the main attraction of this Metropolis. The monument list below is populated using the authentic information at Department of Archaeology.

== List of Monuments ==
ID	Name	Type	Location	District	Coordinates	Image
NP-KMC01-01	Saraswati		Kathmandu Metropolis-01	Kathmandu	27°42′46″N 85°19′44″E	Saraswati Upload Photo
NP-KMC01-02	Ganesh		Kathmandu Metropolis-01	Kathmandu	27°42′46″N 85°19′44″E	Ganesh Upload Photo
NP-KMC01-03	Ananta Narayan Statue		Kathmandu Metropolis-01	Kathmandu	27°42′46″N 85°19′44″E	Ananta Narayan Statue Upload Photo
NP-KMC01-04	Dhungedhara		Kathmandu Metropolis-01	Kathmandu		Dhungedhara Upload Photo
NP-KMC01-05	Sankata statue		Kathmandu Metropolis-01	Kathmandu	27°42′46″N 85°19′44″E	Sankata statue Upload Photo
NP-KMC01-06	Nandikeshhwar Mahadev Temple		Kathmandu Metropolis-01	Kathmandu	27°25′30″N 85°11′35″E	Nandikeshhwar Mahadev Temple Upload Photo
NP-KMC01-07	Dhungedhara		Kathmandu Metropolis-01	Kathmandu		Dhungedhara Upload Photo
NP-KMC01-08	Chaughera Sattal		Kathmandu Metropolis-01	Kathmandu		Upload Photo Upload Photo
NP-KMC01-09	Ganesh Idol		Kathmandu Metropolis-01	Kathmandu	27°25′30″N 85°11′35″E	Ganesh Idol Upload Photo
NP-KMC01-10	Bhagawati Statue		Kathmandu Metropolis-01	Kathmandu		Upload Photo Upload Photo
NP-KMC01-11	Vasudev Kamalaja Statue		Kathmandu Metropolis-01	Kathmandu		Upload Photo Upload Photo
NP-KMC01-12	Shiva Temple		Kathmandu Metropolis-01	Kathmandu	27°25′30″N 85°11′35″E	Shiva Temple Upload Photo
NP-KMC01-13	Garuda Narayan Temple		Kathmandu Metropolis-01	Kathmandu		Upload Photo Upload Photo
NP-KMC01-14	Sridhar Narayan Statue		Kathmandu Metropolis-01	Kathmandu		Sridhar Narayan Statue Upload Photo
NP-KMC01-15	Umamaheshwar		Kathmandu Metropolis-01	Kathmandu		Umamaheshwar Upload Photo
NP-KMC01-16	Radhakrishna Statue		Kathmandu Metropolis-01	Kathmandu		Upload Photo Upload Photo
NP-KMC01-17	Bhudwar Chaitya		Kathmandu Metropolis-01	Kathmandu	27°25′30″N 85°11′37″E	Bhudwar Chaitya Upload Photo
NP-KMC01-18	Lal Ganesh		Kathmandu Metropolis-01	Kathmandu		Lal Ganesh Upload Photo
NP-KMC01-19	Mahankal Bhairav statue		Kathmandu Metropolis-01	Kathmandu		Mahankal Bhairav statue Upload Photo
NP-KMC01-20	Pati		Kathmandu Metropolis-01	Kathmandu		Pati Upload Photo
NP-KMC01-21	Temple of Shitalamai		Kathmandu Metropolis-01	Kathmandu		Temple of Shitalamai Upload Photo
NP-KMC01-22	Laxminarayan Temple		Kathmandu Metropolis-01	Kathmandu		Upload Photo Upload Photo
NP-KMC01-23	Naag pokhari		Kathmandu Metropolis-01	Kathmandu		Naag pokhari Upload Photo
NP-KMC01-24	Pati		Kathmandu Metropolis-01	Kathmandu		Upload Photo Upload Photo
NP-KMC01-25	Goma Ganesh		Kathmandu Metropolis-01	Kathmandu		Upload Photo Upload Photo
NP-KMC01-26	Gaihridhara		Kathmandu Metropolis-01	Kathmandu		Upload Photo Upload Photo
NP-KMC01-27	Harihar Narayan Temple		Kathmandu Metropolis-01	Kathmandu		Harihar Narayan Temple Upload Photo
NP-KMC01-28	Jamo Waha Chaitya		Kathmandu Metropolis-01	Kathmandu		Upload Photo Upload Photo
NP-KMC01-29	Shivalaya		Kathmandu Metropolis-01	Kathmandu		Upload Photo Upload Photo
NP-KMC01-30	Tindhara		Kathmandu Metropolis-01	Kathmandu		Upload Photo Upload Photo
NP-KMC01-31	Chaitya		Kathmandu Metropolis-01	Kathmandu	27°25′30″N 85°11′37″E	Chaitya Upload Photo
NP-KMC01-32	Shivalinga		Kathmandu Metropolis-01	Kathmandu		Upload Photo Upload Photo
NP-KMC01-33	Bhajan Pati		Kathmandu Metropolis-01	Kathmandu		Upload Photo Upload Photo
NP-KMC01-34	Bhakta Bhaktini Statue		Kathmandu Metropolis-01	Kathmandu		Bhakta Bhaktini Statue Upload Photo
NP-KMC01-35	Stone Inscription		Kathmandu Metropolis-01	Kathmandu		Stone Inscription Upload Photo
NP-KMC01-36	Shivalinga		Kathmandu Metropolis-01	Kathmandu		Shivalinga Upload Photo
NP-KMC01-37	Chaitya		Kathmandu Metropolis-01	Kathmandu		Upload Photo Upload Photo
NP-KMC01-38	Umamaheshwar statue		Kathmandu Metropolis-01	Kathmandu		Upload Photo Upload Photo
NP-KMC01-39	Gadadhar Narayan Statue		Kathmandu Metropolis-01	Kathmandu		Gadadhar Narayan Statue Upload Photo
NP-KMC01-40	Stone Inscription		Kathmandu Metropolis-01	Kathmandu		Upload Photo Upload Photo
NP-KMC01-41	Ganesh Idol		Kathmandu Metropolis-01	Kathmandu		Upload Photo Upload Photo
NP-KMC01-42	Bhairav statue		Kathmandu Metropolis-01	Kathmandu		Upload Photo Upload Photo
NP-KMC01-43	Bhimsen statue		Kathmandu Metropolis-01	Kathmandu		Upload Photo Upload Photo
NP-KMC01-44	Nagakanaya Statue		Kathmandu Metropolis-01	Kathmandu		Nagakanaya Statue Upload Photo
NP-KMC01-45	Stone Inscription		Kathmandu Metropolis-01	Kathmandu		Upload Photo Upload Photo
NP-KMC01-46	Harihar Narayan Statue		Kathmandu Metropolis-01	Kathmandu		Harihar Narayan Statue Upload Photo
NP-KMC01-47	Kumarithan		Kathmandu Metropolis-01	Kathmandu		Upload Photo Upload Photo
NP-KMC01-48	Bodhisattva Temple		Kathmandu Metropolis-01	Kathmandu		Upload Photo Upload Photo
NP-KMC01-49	Four Buddha Statue		Kathmandu Metropolis-01	Kathmandu		Upload Photo Upload Photo
NP-KMC01-50	Temple with Toran		Kathmandu Metropolis-01	Kathmandu		Upload Photo Upload Photo
NP-KMC01-51	Shivalinga		Kathmandu Metropolis-01	Kathmandu		Upload Photo Upload Photo
NP-KMC01-52	Chaitya		Kathmandu Metropolis-01	Kathmandu		Upload Photo Upload Photo
NP-KMC01-53	Sun Statue		Kathmandu Metropolis-01	Kathmandu		Upload Photo Upload Photo
NP-KMC01-54	Mahavishnu idol		Kathmandu Metropolis-01	Kathmandu		Upload Photo Upload Photo
NP-KMC01-55	Ganga Statue		Kathmandu Metropolis-01	Kathmandu		Upload Photo Upload Photo
NP-KMC01-56	Jamuna statue		Kathmandu Metropolis-01	Kathmandu		Upload Photo Upload Photo
NP-KMC01-57	Archive		Kathmandu Metropolis-01	Kathmandu		Upload Photo Upload Photo
NP-KMC01-58	Bhairav		Kathmandu Metropolis-01	Kathmandu		Bhairav Upload Photo
NP-KMC01-59	Toran		Kathmandu Metropolis-01	Kathmandu		Upload Photo Upload Photo
NP-KMC01-60	Stone Inscription		Kathmandu Metropolis-01	Kathmandu		Upload Photo Upload Photo
NP-KMC01-61	Umamaheshwar statue		Kathmandu Metropolis-01	Kathmandu		Upload Photo Upload Photo
NP-KMC01-62	Shivalinga Fourfaced statue		Kathmandu Metropolis-01	Kathmandu		Upload Photo Upload Photo
NP-KMC01-63	Bhairav statue		Kathmandu Metropolis-01	Kathmandu		Upload Photo Upload Photo
NP-KMC01-64	Dharmakirthy Vihar Dya Chhe		Kathmandu Metropolis-01	Kathmandu		Upload Photo Upload Photo
NP-KMC01-65	Bhagwati statue		Kathmandu Metropolis-01	Kathmandu		Upload Photo Upload Photo
NP-KMC01-66	Ganga statue		Kathmandu Metropolis-01	Kathmandu	27°42′46″N 85°19′44″E	Upload Photo Upload Photo
NP-KMC01-67	LaxmiNarayan Statue		Kathmandu Metropolis-01	Kathmandu	27°42′46″N 85°19′44″E	LaxmiNarayan Statue Upload Photo
NP-KMC01-68	Gautam Buddha Statue		Kathmandu Metropolis-01	Kathmandu	27°42′46″N 85°19′44″E	Gautam Buddha Statue Upload Photo
NP-KMC01-69	LaxmiNarayan Statue		Kathmandu Metropolis-01	Kathmandu	27°42′46″N 85°19′44″E	LaxmiNarayan Statue Upload Photo
NP-KMC01-70	Umamaheshwor Statue		Kathmandu Metropolis-01	Kathmandu	27°42′46″N 85°19′44″E	Umamaheshwor Statue Upload Photo
NP-KMC01-71	Shani Statue		Kathmandu Metropolis-01	Kathmandu	27°42′46″N 85°19′44″E	Shani Statue Upload Photo
NP-KMC01-72	Bhimsen Statue		Kathmandu Metropolis-01	Kathmandu	27°42′46″N 85°19′44″E	Upload Photo Upload Photo
NP-KMC01-73	Toran of Bhagwati Temple		Kathmandu Metropolis-01	Kathmandu	27°42′46″N 85°19′44″E	Toran of Bhagwati Temple Upload Photo
NP-KMC01-74	Naksaal Bhagwati Temple		Kathmandu Metropolis-01	Kathmandu	27°42′46″N 85°19′44″E	Naksaal Bhagwati Temple Upload Photo
NP-KMC01-75	Narayanhiti Palace Museum		Kathmandu Metropolis-01	Kathmandu		Narayanhiti Palace Museum Upload Photo

== See also ==
- List of Monuments in Bagmati Zone
- List of Monuments in Nepal
