= List of monuments in Metropolis 19, Kathmandu =

This is a list of Monuments in Kathmandu Metropolis -19, officially recognized by and available through the website of the Department of Archaeology, Nepal in the Kathmandu District. Kathmandu is a historically rich city and Hindu temples are the main attraction of this Metropolis. The monument list below is populated using the authentic information at Department of Archaeology.

== List of Monuments ==
ID	Name	Type	Location	District	Coordinates	Image
NP-KMC19-01	Kankashwari Temple		Kathmandu Metropolis-19	Kathmandu		Kankashwari Temple Upload Photo
NP-KMC19-02	Bhagawati Statue		Kathmandu Metropolis-19	Kathmandu		Upload Photo Upload Photo
NP-KMC19-03	Chaitya		Kathmandu Metropolis-19	Kathmandu		Chaitya Upload Photo
NP-KMC19-04	Basundhara		Kathmandu Metropolis-19	Kathmandu		Basundhara Upload Photo
NP-KMC19-05	Sinhini		Kathmandu Metropolis-19	Kathmandu		Upload Photo Upload Photo
NP-KMC19-06	Chaitya		Kathmandu Metropolis-19	Kathmandu		Chaitya Upload Photo
NP-KMC19-07	Manjushree Dewal		Kathmandu Metropolis-19	Kathmandu		Upload Photo Upload Photo
NP-KMC19-08	Ganesh Dewal		Kathmandu Metropolis-19	Kathmandu		Upload Photo Upload Photo
NP-KMC19-09	Chaitya and Pati		Kathmandu Metropolis-19	Kathmandu		Upload Photo Upload Photo
NP-KMC19-10	Pati		Kathmandu Metropolis-19	Kathmandu		Upload Photo Upload Photo
NP-KMC19-11	Pati		Kathmandu Metropolis-19	Kathmandu		Upload Photo Upload Photo
NP-KMC19-12	Pati		Kathmandu Metropolis-19	Kathmandu		Upload Photo Upload Photo
NP-KMC19-13	Tharmadhat Chaitya		Kathmandu Metropolis-19	Kathmandu		Upload Photo Upload Photo
NP-KMC19-14	Stone Tap		Kathmandu Metropolis-19	Kathmandu		Stone Tap Upload Photo
NP-KMC19-15	Stone Tap		Kathmandu Metropolis-19	Kathmandu		Upload Photo Upload Photo
NP-KMC19-16	Stone Tap		Kathmandu Metropolis-19	Kathmandu		Upload Photo Upload Photo
NP-KMC19-17	Chasan Pati		Kathmandu Metropolis-19	Kathmandu		Upload Photo Upload Photo
NP-KMC19-18	Maruhiti Pati		Kathmandu Metropolis-19	Kathmandu		Upload Photo Upload Photo
NP-KMC19-19	Buddhamurti		Kathmandu Metropolis-19	Kathmandu		Upload Photo Upload Photo
NP-KMC19-20	Maruhiti Pati		Kathmandu Metropolis-19	Kathmandu		Upload Photo Upload Photo
NP-KMC19-21	Bhajan Pati		Kathmandu Metropolis-19	Kathmandu		Upload Photo Upload Photo
NP-KMC19-22	Ganesh Dewal		Kathmandu Metropolis-19	Kathmandu		Upload Photo Upload Photo
NP-KMC19-23	Pati		Kathmandu Metropolis-19	Kathmandu		Upload Photo Upload Photo
NP-KMC19-24	Chaitya		Kathmandu Metropolis-19	Kathmandu		Chaitya Upload Photo
NP-KMC19-25	Tago Chaitya		Kathmandu Metropolis-19	Kathmandu		Tago Chaitya Upload Photo
NP-KMC19-26	Pati		Kathmandu Metropolis-19	Kathmandu		Upload Photo Upload Photo
NP-KMC19-27	Bhagna Pati		Kathmandu Metropolis-19	Kathmandu		Upload Photo Upload Photo
NP-KMC19-28	Sattal		Kathmandu Metropolis-19	Kathmandu		Upload Photo Upload Photo

== See also ==
- List of Monuments in Bagmati Zone
- List of Monuments in Nepal
