= List of monuments in Metropolis 16, Kathmandu =

This is a list of Monuments in Kathmandu Metropolis -16, officially recognized by and available through the website of the Department of Archaeology, Nepal in the Kathmandu District. Kathmandu is a historically rich city and Hindu temples are the main attraction of this Metropolis. The monument list below is populated using the authentic information at Department of Archaeology.

== List of Monuments ==
ID	Name	Type	Location	District	Coordinates	Image
NP-KMC16-01	Sorhakhutte Pati		Kathmandu Metropolis-16	Kathmandu		Upload Photo Upload Photo
NP-KMC16-02	Pati		Kathmandu Metropolis-16	Kathmandu		Upload Photo Upload Photo
NP-KMC16-03	Bhotupande Sattal		Kathmandu Metropolis-16	Kathmandu		Upload Photo Upload Photo
NP-KMC16-04	Shivalaya		Kathmandu Metropolis-16	Kathmandu		Upload Photo Upload Photo
NP-KMC16-05	Bhotu Pandey		Kathmandu Metropolis-16	Kathmandu		Upload Photo Upload Photo
NP-KMC16-06	Shivalaya		Kathmandu Metropolis-16	Kathmandu		Upload Photo Upload Photo
NP-KMC16-07	Dhungedhara		Kathmandu Metropolis-16	Kathmandu		Dhungedhara Upload Photo
NP-KMC16-08	Chaitya		Kathmandu Metropolis-16	Kathmandu		Chaitya Upload Photo
NP-KMC16-09	Dhungedhara		Kathmandu Metropolis-16	Kathmandu		Dhungedhara Upload Photo
NP-KMC16-10	Dhungedhara		Kathmandu Metropolis-16	Kathmandu		Upload Photo Upload Photo
NP-KMC16-11	Dhungedhara		Kathmandu Metropolis-16	Kathmandu		Upload Photo Upload Photo
NP-KMC16-12	Shivalaya		Kathmandu Metropolis-16	Kathmandu		Shivalaya Upload Photo
NP-KMC16-13	Swet Ganesh temple		Kathmandu Metropolis-16	Kathmandu		Upload Photo Upload Photo
NP-KMC16-14	Swet Ganesh		Kathmandu Metropolis-16	Kathmandu		Upload Photo Upload Photo
NP-KMC16-15	Bhotu Pande's Garden and Dhungedhara		Kathmandu Metropolis-16	Kathmandu		Upload Photo Upload Photo
NP-KMC16-16	Bhotu Pandey Dhungedhara		Kathmandu Metropolis-16	Kathmandu		Upload Photo Upload Photo
NP-KMC16-17	Sattal		Kathmandu Metropolis-16	Kathmandu		Upload Photo Upload Photo
NP-KMC16-18	Ganesh Sthan		Kathmandu Metropolis-16	Kathmandu		Upload Photo Upload Photo
NP-KMC16-19	Ganesh and Narayan Statues		Kathmandu Metropolis-16	Kathmandu		Upload Photo Upload Photo
NP-KMC16-20	Chaitya		Kathmandu Metropolis-16	Kathmandu		Chaitya Upload Photo
NP-KMC16-21	Jogambar Kuldebata's statue		Kathmandu Metropolis-16	Kathmandu		Jogambar Kuldebata's statue Upload Photo
NP-KMC16-22	Jogambar Kuldebata temple		Kathmandu Metropolis-16	Kathmandu		Jogambar Kuldebata temple Upload Photo
NP-KMC16-23	Virlakshmi Bhukteshwor Shivalaya		Kathmandu Metropolis-16	Kathmandu		Upload Photo Upload Photo
NP-KMC16-24	Balaju Ghat Sattal		Kathmandu Metropolis-16	Kathmandu		Upload Photo Upload Photo
NP-KMC16-25	Mhyepi Ajima temple		Kathmandu Metropolis-16	Kathmandu		Mhyepi Ajima temple Upload Photo
NP-KMC16-26	Chaitya		Kathmandu Metropolis-16	Kathmandu		Chaitya Upload Photo
NP-KMC16-27	Mhyepi Pati		Kathmandu Metropolis-16	Kathmandu		Mhyepi Pati Upload Photo
NP-KMC16-28	Simhavahini Manjusri statue		Kathmandu Metropolis-16	Kathmandu		Upload Photo Upload Photo
NP-KMC16-29	Saraswati Statue		Kathmandu Metropolis-16	Kathmandu		Saraswati Statue Upload Photo
NP-KMC16-30	Saraswati Statue		Kathmandu Metropolis-16	Kathmandu		Upload Photo Upload Photo
NP-KMC16-31	Mhyepi Pati		Kathmandu Metropolis-16	Kathmandu		Upload Photo Upload Photo

== See also ==
- List of Monuments in Bagmati Zone
- List of Monuments in Nepal
