= List of monuments in Metropolis 3, Kathmandu =

This is a list of Monuments in Kathmandu Metropolis -3, officially recognized by and available through the website of the Department of Archaeology, Nepal in the Kathmandu District. Kathmandu is historically rich city. Hindu temples are the main attraction of this Metropolis.

== List of Monuments ==
ID	Name	Type	Location	District	Coordinates	Image
NP-KMC03-01	Ganesh Temple		Kathmandu Metropolis-03	Kathmandu		Upload Photo Upload Photo
NP-KMC03-02	Bhairav ??Temple		Kathmandu Metropolis-03	Kathmandu		Upload Photo Upload Photo
NP-KMC03-03	Temple of Chundevi		Kathmandu Metropolis-03	Kathmandu		Upload Photo Upload Photo
NP-KMC03-04	Symbolic Seelasthan		Kathmandu Metropolis-03	Kathmandu		Upload Photo Upload Photo

== See also ==
- List of Monuments in Bagmati Zone
- List of Monuments in Nepal
