= List of monuments in Metropolis 18, Kathmandu =

This is a list of Monuments in Kathmandu Metropolis -18, officially recognized by and available through the website of the Department of Archaeology, Nepal in the Kathmandu District. Kathmandu is a historically rich city and Hindu temples are the main attraction of this Metropolis. The monument list below is populated using the authentic information at Department of Archaeology.

== List of Monuments ==
ID	Name	Type	Location	District	Coordinates	Image
NP-KMC18-01	Nardevi Swetkali temple		Kathmandu Metropolis-18	Kathmandu		Upload Photo Upload Photo
NP-KMC18-02	Bajradhatu Chaitya		Kathmandu Metropolis-18	Kathmandu		Upload Photo Upload Photo
NP-KMC18-03	Shivalaya		Kathmandu Metropolis-18	Kathmandu		Upload Photo Upload Photo
NP-KMC18-04	Bajradhatu Chaitya		Kathmandu Metropolis-18	Kathmandu		Upload Photo Upload Photo
NP-KMC18-05	Kayeta Hiti		Kathmandu Metropolis-18	Kathmandu		Kayeta Hiti Upload Photo
NP-KMC18-06	Ganesh and Kumar Idol		Kathmandu Metropolis-18	Kathmandu		Upload Photo Upload Photo
NP-KMC18-07	Umamaheshwar Statue		Kathmandu Metropolis-18	Kathmandu		Umamaheshwar Statue Upload Photo
NP-KMC18-08	Stone Tap		Kathmandu Metropolis-18	Kathmandu		Upload Photo Upload Photo
NP-KMC18-09	Saraswati Idol and Shivalinga		Kathmandu Metropolis-18	Kathmandu		Saraswati Idol and Shivalinga Upload Photo
NP-KMC18-10	Shivalaya		Kathmandu Metropolis-18	Kathmandu		Upload Photo Upload Photo
NP-KMC18-11	Ganesh Mahankal Temple		Kathmandu Metropolis-18	Kathmandu		Upload Photo Upload Photo
NP-KMC18-12	Padampani Lokeshwor		Kathmandu Metropolis-18	Kathmandu		Upload Photo Upload Photo
NP-KMC18-13	Chaitya		Kathmandu Metropolis-18	Kathmandu		Upload Photo Upload Photo
NP-KMC18-14	Raktakali Temple		Kathmandu Metropolis-18	Kathmandu		Raktakali Temple Upload Photo
NP-KMC18-15	Pati		Kathmandu Metropolis-18	Kathmandu		Upload Photo Upload Photo
NP-KMC18-16	Ganeshsthan		Kathmandu Metropolis-18	Kathmandu		Ganeshsthan Upload Photo
NP-KMC18-17	Raktakali Shivalaya		Kathmandu Metropolis-18	Kathmandu		Raktakali Shivalaya Upload Photo

== See also ==
- List of Monuments in Bagmati Zone
- List of Monuments in Nepal
