= List of monuments in Metropolis 10, Kathmandu =

This is a list of Monuments in Kathmandu Metropolis -10, officially recognized by and available through the website of the Department of Archaeology, Nepal in the Kathmandu District. Kathmandu is a historically rich city and Hindu temples are the main attraction of this Metropolis. The monument list below is populated using the authentic information at the Department of Archaeology.

== List of Monuments ==
ID	Name	Type	Location	District	Coordinates	Image
NP-KMC10-01	Temple of Chhakkubakku		Kathmandu Metropolis-10	Kathmandu		Upload Photo Upload Photo
NP-KMC10-02	Mateshwar Mahadev ( Baneshwar Mahadev)		Kathmandu Metropolis-10	Kathmandu		Upload Photo Upload Photo
NP-KMC10-03	Jalasayan Narayan		Kathmandu Metropolis-10	Kathmandu		Upload Photo Upload Photo
NP-KMC10-04	Bhagawati Lalitadevi		Kathmandu Metropolis-10	Kathmandu		Upload Photo Upload Photo
NP-KMC10-05	Vidya Prakareshwar Shivalinga		Kathmandu Metropolis-10	Kathmandu		Upload Photo Upload Photo
NP-KMC10-06	Mateshwar Mahadev (Baneshwar Mahadev) temple		Kathmandu Metropolis-10	Kathmandu		Upload Photo Upload Photo
NP-KMC10-07	Mateshwar Mahadev Sattal		Kathmandu Metropolis-10	Kathmandu		Upload Photo Upload Photo
NP-KMC10-08	Shivalaya		Kathmandu Metropolis-09			Upload Photo Upload Photo

== See also ==
- List of Monuments in Bagmati Zone
- List of Monuments in Nepal
