= List of monuments in Metropolis 20, Kathmandu =

This is a list of Monuments in Kathmandu Metropolis -20, officially recognized by and available through the website of the Department of Archaeology, Nepal in the Kathmandu District. Kathmandu is a historically rich city and Hindu temples are the main attraction of this Metropolis. The monument list below is populated using the authentic information at Department of Archaeology.

== List of Monuments ==
ID	Name	Type	Location	District	Coordinates	Image
NP-KMC20-01	Chaitya		Kathmandu Metropolis-20	Kathmandu		Chaitya Upload Photo
NP-KMC20-02	Harihar Idol		Kathmandu Metropolis-20	Kathmandu		Upload Photo Upload Photo
NP-KMC20-03	Pati		Kathmandu Metropolis-20	Kathmandu		Pati Upload Photo
NP-KMC20-04	Trust house of Bhimsen Temple		Kathmandu Metropolis-20	Kathmandu		Trust house of Bhimsen Temple Upload Photo
NP-KMC20-05	Tara n lokeshwor Mahankal		Kathmandu Metropolis-20	Kathmandu		Upload Photo Upload Photo
NP-KMC20-06	Ganesh Statue		Kathmandu Metropolis-20	Kathmandu		Ganesh Statue Upload Photo
NP-KMC20-07	Nasal Devata		Kathmandu Metropolis-20	Kathmandu		Nasal Devata Upload Photo
NP-KMC20-08	Chaitya		Kathmandu Metropolis-20	Kathmandu		Chaitya Upload Photo
NP-KMC20-09	Maruwahi Bahal		Kathmandu Metropolis-20	Kathmandu		Upload Photo Upload Photo
NP-KMC20-10	Marubahal chaitya		Kathmandu Metropolis-20	Kathmandu		Upload Photo Upload Photo
NP-KMC20-11	Saraswati Statue		Kathmandu Metropolis-20	Kathmandu		Saraswati Statue Upload Photo
NP-KMC20-12	Santaneshwor Temple		Kathmandu Metropolis-20	Kathmandu		Santaneshwor Temple Upload Photo
NP-KMC20-13	Bhimsen Temple		Kathmandu Metropolis-20	Kathmandu		Bhimsen Temple Upload Photo
NP-KMC20-14	Sattal		Kathmandu Metropolis-20	Kathmandu		Upload Photo Upload Photo
NP-KMC20-15	Chaitya		Kathmandu Metropolis-20	Kathmandu		Chaitya Upload Photo
NP-KMC20-16	Narayan Temple		Kathmandu Metropolis-20	Kathmandu		Narayan Temple Upload Photo
NP-KMC20-17	Chaitya		Kathmandu Metropolis-20	Kathmandu		Chaitya Upload Photo
NP-KMC20-18	chaitya		Kathmandu Metropolis-20	Kathmandu		chaitya Upload Photo
NP-KMC20-19	Stone tap		Kathmandu Metropolis-20	Kathmandu		Stone tap Upload Photo
NP-KMC20-20	Stone tap		Kathmandu Metropolis-20	Kathmandu		Stone tap Upload Photo
NP-KMC20-21	Chaitya		Kathmandu Metropolis-20	Kathmandu		Upload Photo Upload Photo
NP-KMC20-22	Chaitya		Kathmandu Metropolis-20	Kathmandu		Upload Photo Upload Photo
NP-KMC20-23	Ganesh Idol		Kathmandu Metropolis-20	Kathmandu		Upload Photo Upload Photo
NP-KMC20-24	Narayan Temple		Kathmandu Metropolis-20	Kathmandu		Upload Photo Upload Photo
NP-KMC20-25	Narayan Statue		Kathmandu Metropolis-20	Kathmandu		Upload Photo Upload Photo
NP-KMC20-26	Shivalaya		Kathmandu Metropolis-20	Kathmandu		Upload Photo Upload Photo
NP-KMC20-27	Hexagonal Chaitya		Kathmandu Metropolis-20	Kathmandu		Upload Photo Upload Photo
NP-KMC20-28	Chaitya		Kathmandu Metropolis-20	Kathmandu		Upload Photo Upload Photo
NP-KMC20-29	Ganesh Temple		Kathmandu Metropolis-20	Kathmandu		Ganesh Temple Upload Photo
NP-KMC20-30	Pati Sattal		Kathmandu Metropolis-20	Kathmandu		Pati Sattal Upload Photo
NP-KMC20-31	Akchomya Temple		Kathmandu Metropolis-20	Kathmandu		Upload Photo Upload Photo
NP-KMC20-32	Pati		Kathmandu Metropolis-20	Kathmandu		Pati Upload Photo
NP-KMC20-33	Quapa dho chhen		Kathmandu Metropolis-20	Kathmandu		Upload Photo Upload Photo
NP-KMC20-34	Stone tap		Kathmandu Metropolis-20	Kathmandu		Stone tap Upload Photo
NP-KMC20-35	Chaitya		Kathmandu Metropolis-20	Kathmandu		Chaitya Upload Photo
NP-KMC20-36	Kirtipunya Mahavihar		Kathmandu Metropolis-20	Kathmandu		Kirtipunya Mahavihar Upload Photo

== See also ==
- List of Monuments in Bagmati Zone
- List of Monuments in Nepal
