= List of monuments in Rasuwa, Nepal =

This is a list of monuments in Rasuwa District, Nepal as officially recognized by and available through the website of the Department of Archaeology, Nepal. Rasuwa is a district of Bagmati Province and is located in central northern parts of Nepal.

== List of monuments ==
ID	Name	Type	Location	District	Coordinates	Image
NP-RAS-01	Rasuwa Fort		Rasuwa Gadhi	Rasuwa	28°09′50″N 85°13′26″E	Rasuwa Fort Upload Photo
NP-RAS-02	Sherpa Monastery			Rasuwa		Upload Photo Upload Photo

== See also ==
- List of monuments in Bagmati Province
- List of monuments in Nepal
