= List of monuments in Metropolis 14, Kathmandu =

This is a list of Monuments in Kathmandu Metropolis -14, officially recognized by and available through the website of the Department of Archaeology, Nepal in the Kathmandu District. Kathmandu is a historically rich city and Hindu temples are the main attraction of this Metropolis. The monument list below is populated using the authentic information at Department of Archaeology.

== List of Monuments ==
ID	Name	Type	Location	District	Coordinates	Image
NP-KMC14-01	Kalanki Devi Sthan		Kathmandu Metropolis-14	Kathmandu		Kalanki Devi Sthan Upload Photo
NP-KMC14-02	Kalanki Mai Murti		Kathmandu Metropolis-14	Kathmandu		Upload Photo Upload Photo
NP-KMC14-03	Lakshmi		Kathmandu Metropolis-14	Kathmandu		Upload Photo Upload Photo
NP-KMC14-04	Shivalinga		Kathmandu Metropolis-14	Kathmandu		Upload Photo Upload Photo
NP-KMC14-05	Shivalinga		Kathmandu Metropolis-14	Kathmandu		Upload Photo Upload Photo
NP-KMC14-06	Shivalinga		Kathmandu Metropolis-14	Kathmandu		Upload Photo Upload Photo
NP-KMC14-07	Pati		Kathmandu Metropolis-14	Kathmandu		Upload Photo Upload Photo
NP-KMC14-08	Buddhamurti		Kathmandu Metropolis-14	Kathmandu		Upload Photo Upload Photo
NP-KMC14-09	Lokeshwar statue		Kathmandu Metropolis-14	Kathmandu		Upload Photo Upload Photo
NP-KMC14-10	Kal Bhairav ??		Kathmandu Metropolis-14	Kathmandu		Upload Photo Upload Photo
NP-KMC14-11	Stone Inscription		Kathmandu Metropolis-14	Kathmandu		Upload Photo Upload Photo
NP-KMC14-12	Pati		Kathmandu Metropolis-14	Kathmandu		Upload Photo Upload Photo
NP-KMC14-13	Bktini's statue		Kathmandu Metropolis-14	Kathmandu		Upload Photo Upload Photo
NP-KMC14-14	Bhakta's statue		Kathmandu Metropolis-14	Kathmandu		Upload Photo Upload Photo
NP-KMC14-15	Buddhamurti		Kathmandu Metropolis-14	Kathmandu		Upload Photo Upload Photo
NP-KMC14-16	Vishnu statue		Kathmandu Metropolis-14	Kathmandu		Upload Photo Upload Photo
NP-KMC14-17	Newly built Pati		Kathmandu Metropolis-14	Kathmandu		Upload Photo Upload Photo
NP-KMC14-18	Chaturmuki Shivalinga		Kathmandu Metropolis-14	Kathmandu		Upload Photo Upload Photo
NP-KMC14-19	Pati		Kathmandu Metropolis-14	Kathmandu		Upload Photo Upload Photo
NP-KMC14-20	Kirtimukh Bhairav		Kathmandu Metropolis-14	Kathmandu		Upload Photo Upload Photo
NP-KMC14-21	Kuleshwar Mahadev temple		Kathmandu Metropolis-14	Kathmandu		Upload Photo Upload Photo
NP-KMC14-22	Mahadev Kuleshwar statue		Kathmandu Metropolis-14	Kathmandu		Upload Photo Upload Photo
NP-KMC14-23	Kaleshwari Mai's Devasthal		Kathmandu Metropolis-14	Kathmandu		Upload Photo Upload Photo
NP-KMC14-24	Shivalinga		Kathmandu Metropolis-14	Kathmandu		Upload Photo Upload Photo
NP-KMC14-25	Bhagirath		Kathmandu Metropolis-14	Kathmandu		Upload Photo Upload Photo
NP-KMC14-26	Archive		Kathmandu Metropolis-14	Kathmandu		Upload Photo Upload Photo
NP-KMC14-27	Seshnarayan statue		Kathmandu Metropolis-14	Kathmandu		Upload Photo Upload Photo

== See also ==
- List of Monuments in Bagmati Zone
- List of Monuments in Nepal
