= List of monuments in Metropolis 7, Kathmandu =

This is a list of Monuments in Kathmandu Metropolis -7, officially recognized by and available through the website of the Department of Archaeology, Nepal in the Kathmandu District. Kathmandu is a historically rich city and Hindu temples are the main attraction of this Metropolis. The monument list below is populated using the authentic information at Department of Archaeology.

== List of Monuments ==
ID	Name	Type	Location	District	Coordinates	Image
NP-KMC07-01	Chandra Vinayak		Kathmandu Metropolis-07	Kathmandu		Upload Photo Upload Photo
NP-KMC07-02	Chandra Vinayak Sattal		Kathmandu Metropolis-07	Kathmandu		Upload Photo Upload Photo
NP-KMC07-03	Baidya Sattal		Kathmandu Metropolis-07	Kathmandu		Upload Photo Upload Photo
NP-KMC07-04	Dhando Chaitya		Kathmandu Metropolis-07	Kathmandu		Dhando Chaitya Upload Photo
NP-KMC07-05	Charumati Suvarnapur Mahavihar		Kathmandu Metropolis-07	Kathmandu		Charumati Suvarnapur Mahavihar Upload Photo
NP-KMC07-06	Karunamaya		Kathmandu Metropolis-07	Kathmandu		Upload Photo Upload Photo
NP-KMC07-07	Gaganganj Mahavihar Agam Chhe		Kathmandu Metropolis-07	Kathmandu		Upload Photo Upload Photo
NP-KMC07-08	Bhandareshwar Mahadev		Kathmandu Metropolis-07	Kathmandu		Upload Photo Upload Photo
NP-KMC07-09	Manjusri statue		Kathmandu Metropolis-07	Kathmandu		Upload Photo Upload Photo
NP-KMC07-10	Shakyamuni Buddha Statue		Kathmandu Metropolis-07	Kathmandu		Upload Photo Upload Photo
NP-KMC07-11	Kutubhal Gaganganj Mahavihar		Kathmandu Metropolis-07	Kathmandu		Upload Photo Upload Photo
NP-KMC07-12	Padypani lokeshwor		Kathmandu Metropolis-07	Kathmandu		Upload Photo Upload Photo
NP-KMC07-13	Dwansal Pati		Kathmandu Metropolis-07	Kathmandu		Upload Photo Upload Photo
NP-KMC07-14	Bajradhaneshwari		Kathmandu Metropolis-07	Kathmandu		Upload Photo Upload Photo

== See also ==
- List of Monuments in Bagmati Zone
- List of Monuments in Nepal
