= List of monuments in Metropolis 8, Kathmandu =

This is a list of Monuments in Kathmandu Metropolis -8, officially recognized by and available through the website of the Department of Archaeology, Nepal in the Kathmandu District. Kathmandu is a historically rich city and Hindu temples are the main attraction of this Metropolis. The monument list below is populated using the authentic information at Department of Archaeology.

== List of Monuments ==
ID	Name	Type	Location	District	Coordinates	Image
NP-KMC08-01	Pashupatinath Temple		Kathmandu Metropolis-08	Kathmandu	27°25′N 85°12′E	Pashupatinath Temple Upload Photo
NP-KMC08-02	Guhyeshwari Temple		Kathmandu Metropolis-08	Kathmandu	27°25′N 85°13′E	Guhyeshwari Temple Upload Photo

== See also ==
- List of Monuments in Bagmati Zone
- List of Monuments in Nepal
