= List of monuments in Bagmati Zone =

Bagmati Zone was one of the fourteen zones of Nepal, comprising eight districts, namely, Bhaktapur, Lalitpur, Kathmandu, Dhading, Kavrepalanchok, Nuwakot, Rasuwa and Sindhupalchowk. Here is district wise List of Monuments which is in the Bagmati Zone.

== Bagmati Zone ==
- List of monuments in Bhaktapur District
- List of monuments in Dhading District
- List of monuments in Kathmandu District
- List of monuments in Kavrepalanchok District
- List of monuments in Lalitpur District
- List of monuments in Nuwakot District
- List of monuments in Rasuwa District
- List of monuments in Sindhupalchok District
