= Department of Archaeology (Nepal) =

Government department of Nepal

- पुरातत्व विभाग

Agency overview
- Formed: 1952
- Preceding agency: Government of Nepal; Ministry of Culture, Tourism and Civil Aviation
- Jurisdiction: Nepal
- Headquarters: Ramshahpath, Kathmandu, Nepal
- Minister responsible: Khadak Raj Paudel, Minister of Culture, Tourism and Civil Aviation
- Agency executive: Saubhagya Pradhananga, Director General
- Parent agency: Ministry of Culture, Tourism and Civil Aviation, Government of Nepal
- Website: http://www.doa.gov.np

The Department of Archaeology (DOA) is the primary governmental organization for archaeological research and protection of cultural heritage in Nepal. It was established in 1952. After the April 2015 Nepal earthquake and May 2015 Nepal earthquake, the Department got involved with analyzing and reconstructing the ancient buildings in Nepal.

== History ==
The Department of Archaeology has served under changing ministries since its establishment in 1953:

Date	Ministry Served
1953–1981	Ministry of Education
1981–1995	Ministry of Education and culture
1995–2000	Ministry of Youth, sports and culture
2000–2008	Ministry of culture, tourism and Civil Aviation
2008–2009	Ministry of culture and State Reconstructing
2009–2011	Ministry of Federal Affairs, Constituent Assembly, Parliamentary Affairs and Culture
since 2011	Ministry of Culture, Tourism and Civil Aviation
