= Tourism in Lumbini Province =

The tourism industry is a massively growing industry in Lumbini province, welcoming the largest numbers of tourists in Nepal from about 113 countries worldwide.

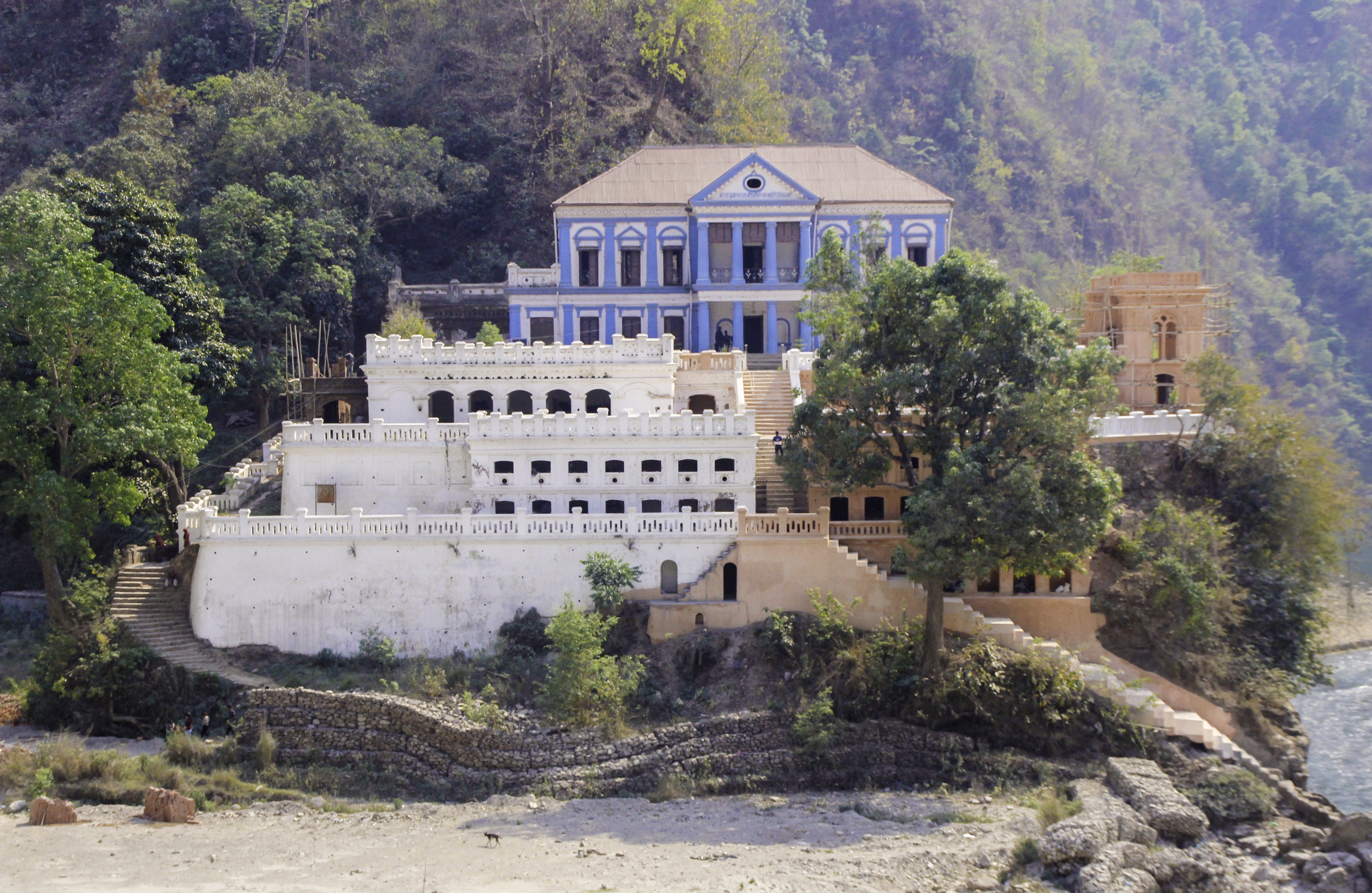
Ranigat Darbar also popularly known as Ranimahal which reflects the beautiful history in itself.

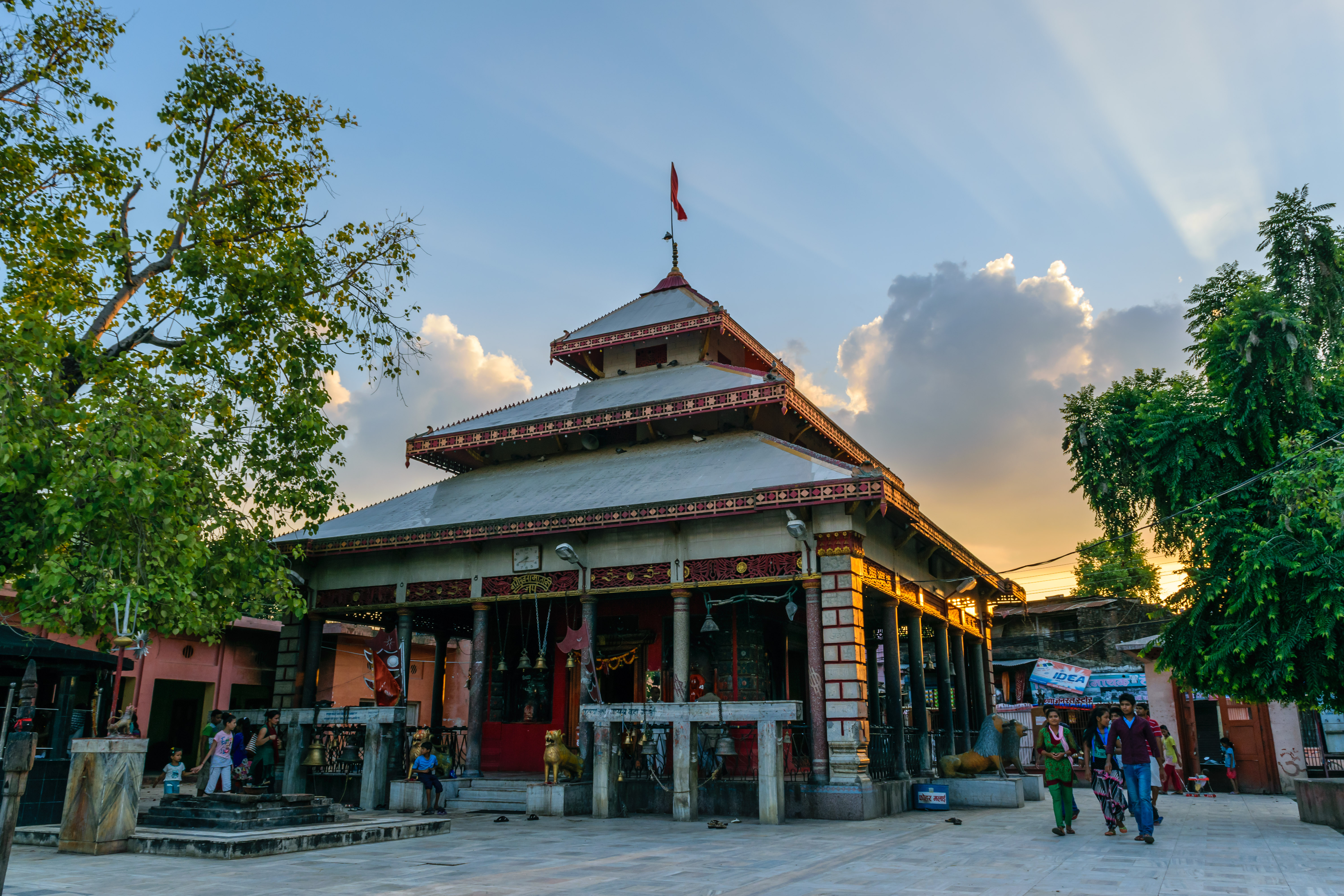
Bageshwori Temple

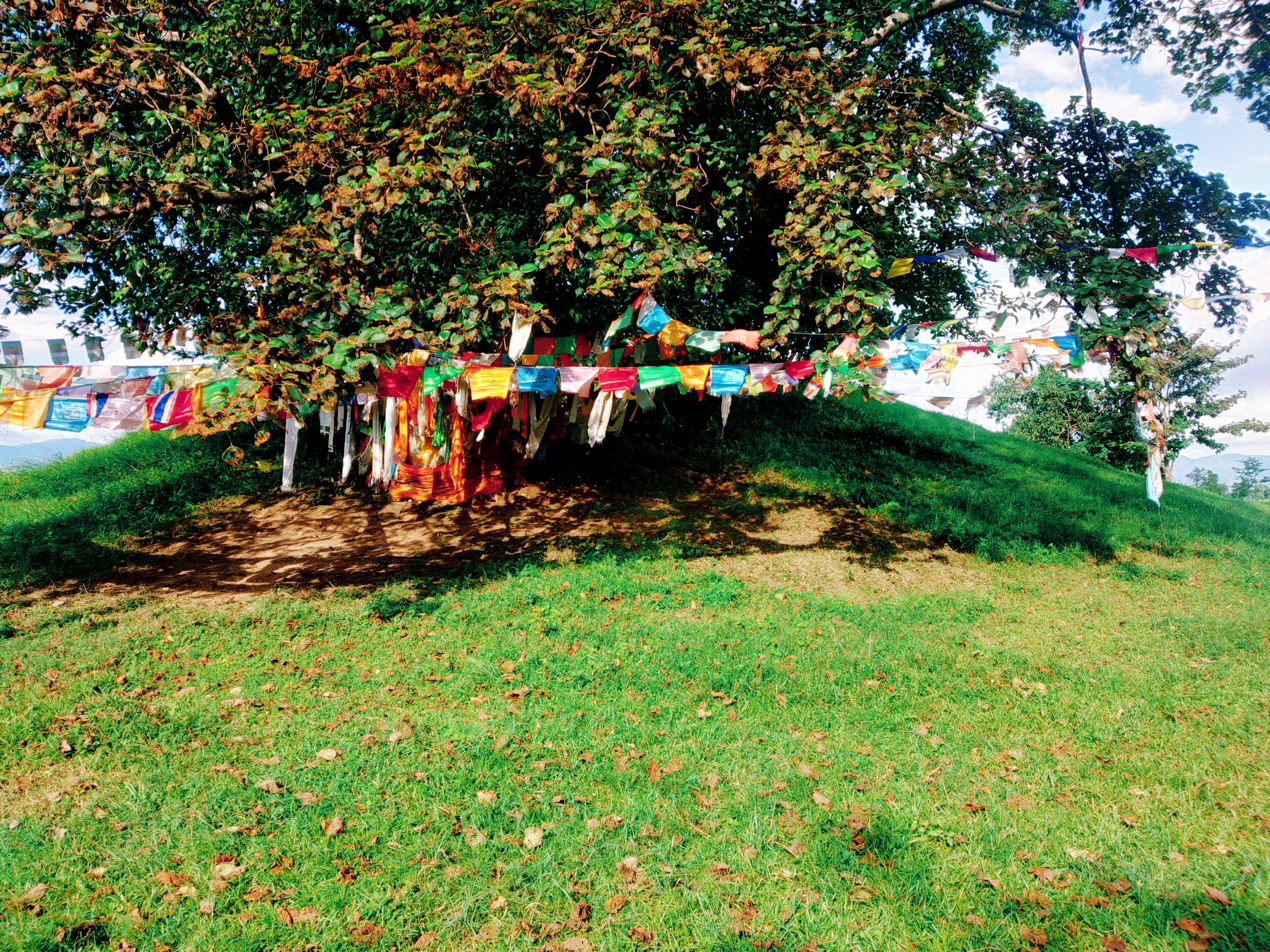
sacred Bodhi tree at Ramagrama stupa, Nepal

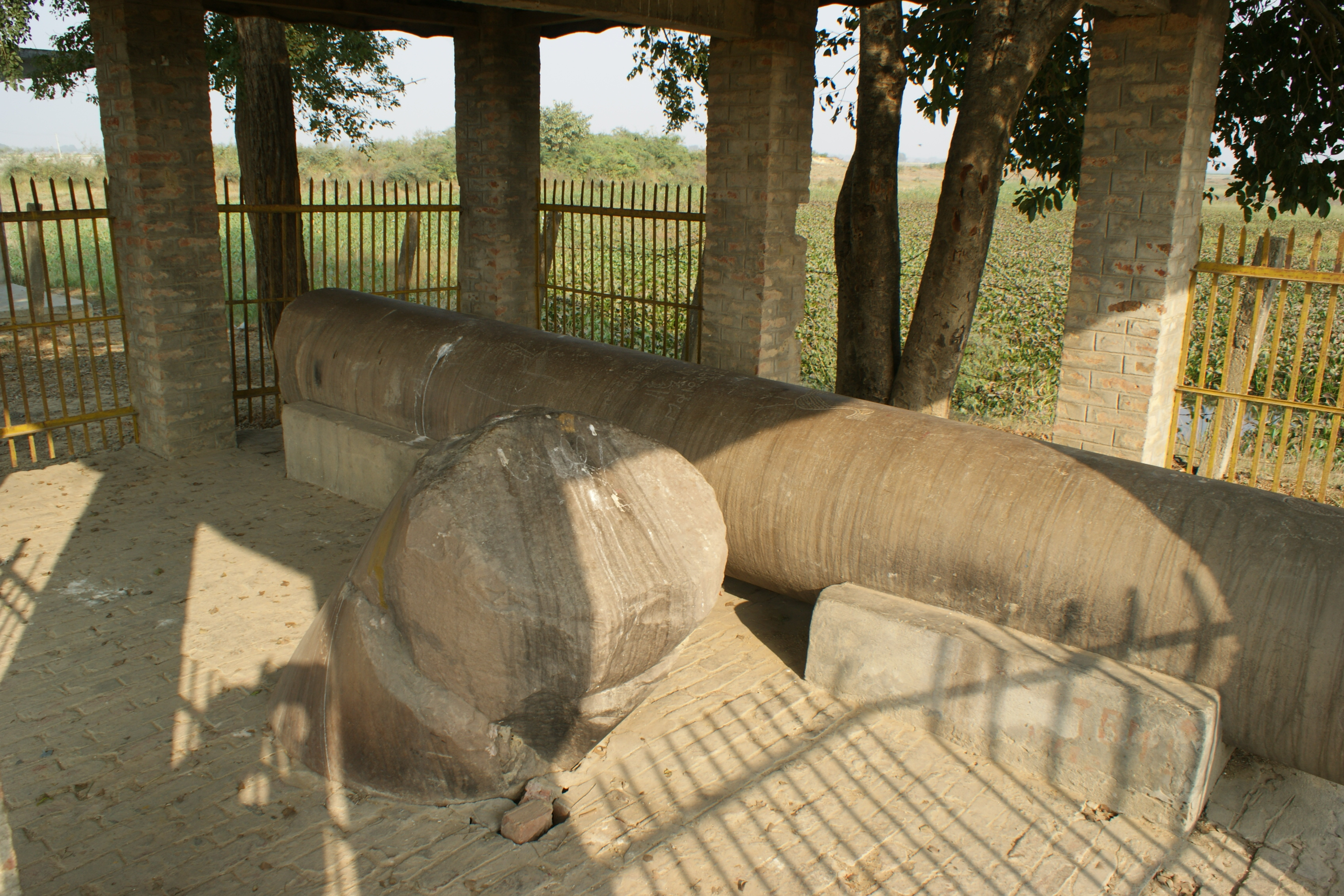
The Nigali Sagar pillar, one of the pillars of Ashoka

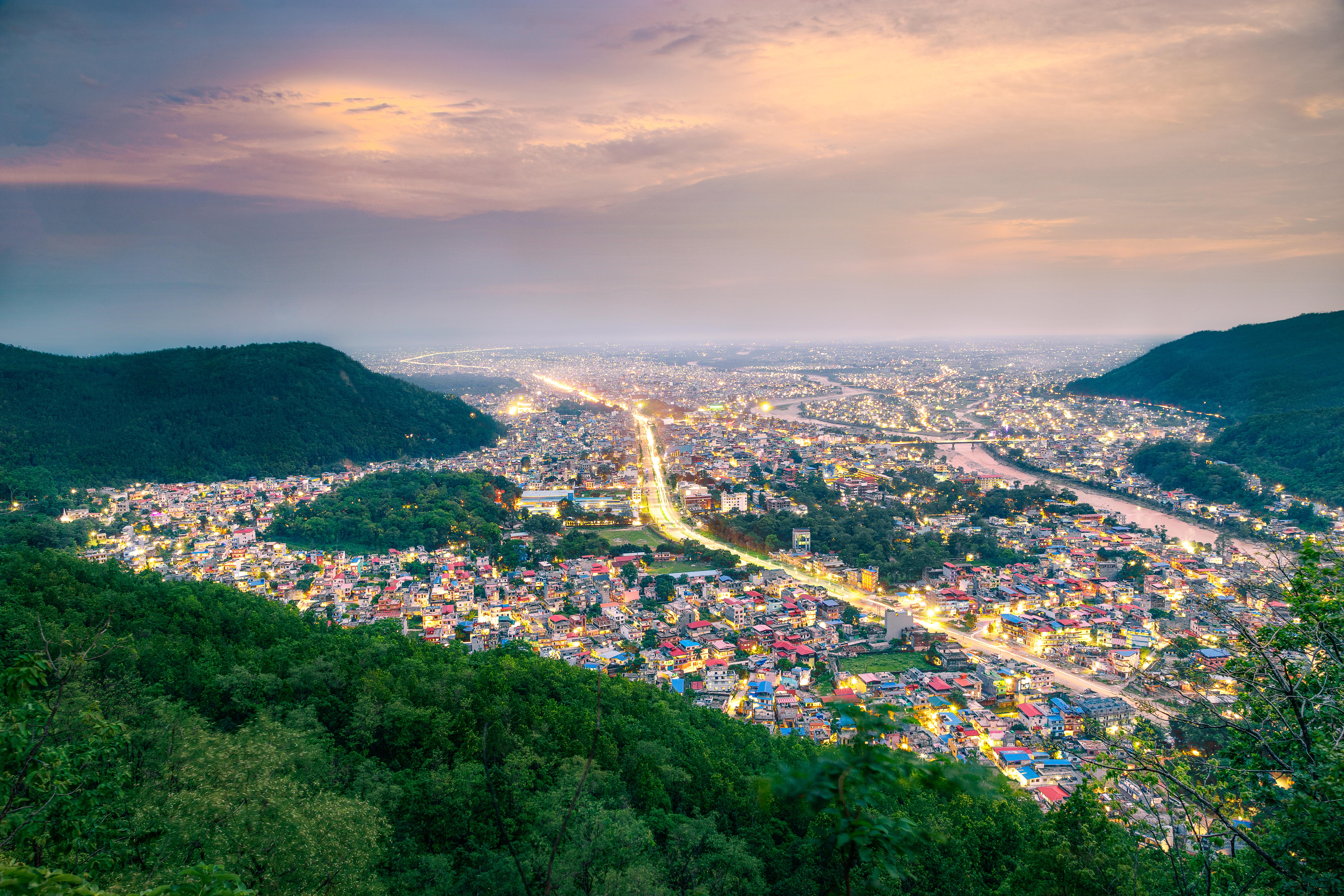
Butwal skyline

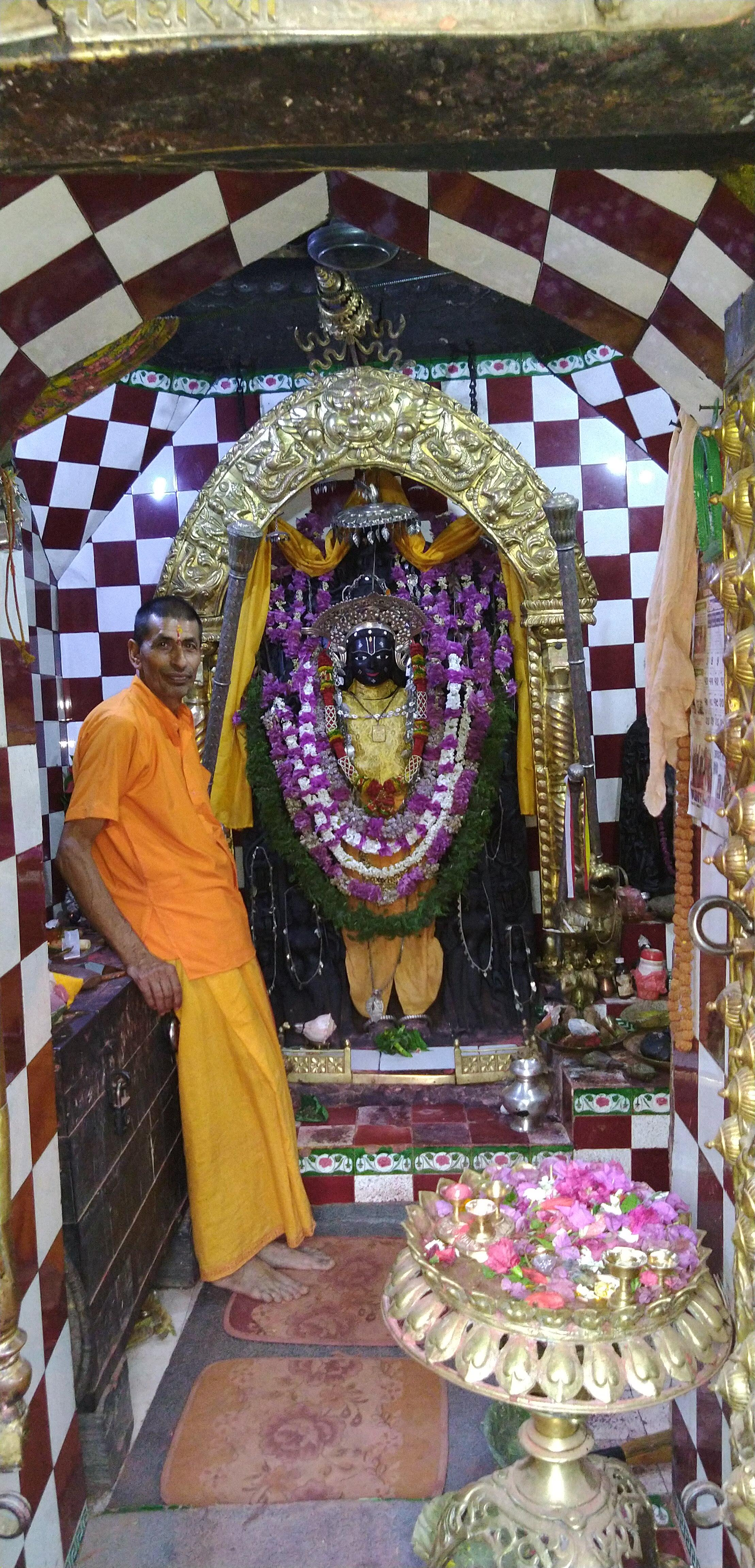
Rishikesh Complex of Ruru Kshetra

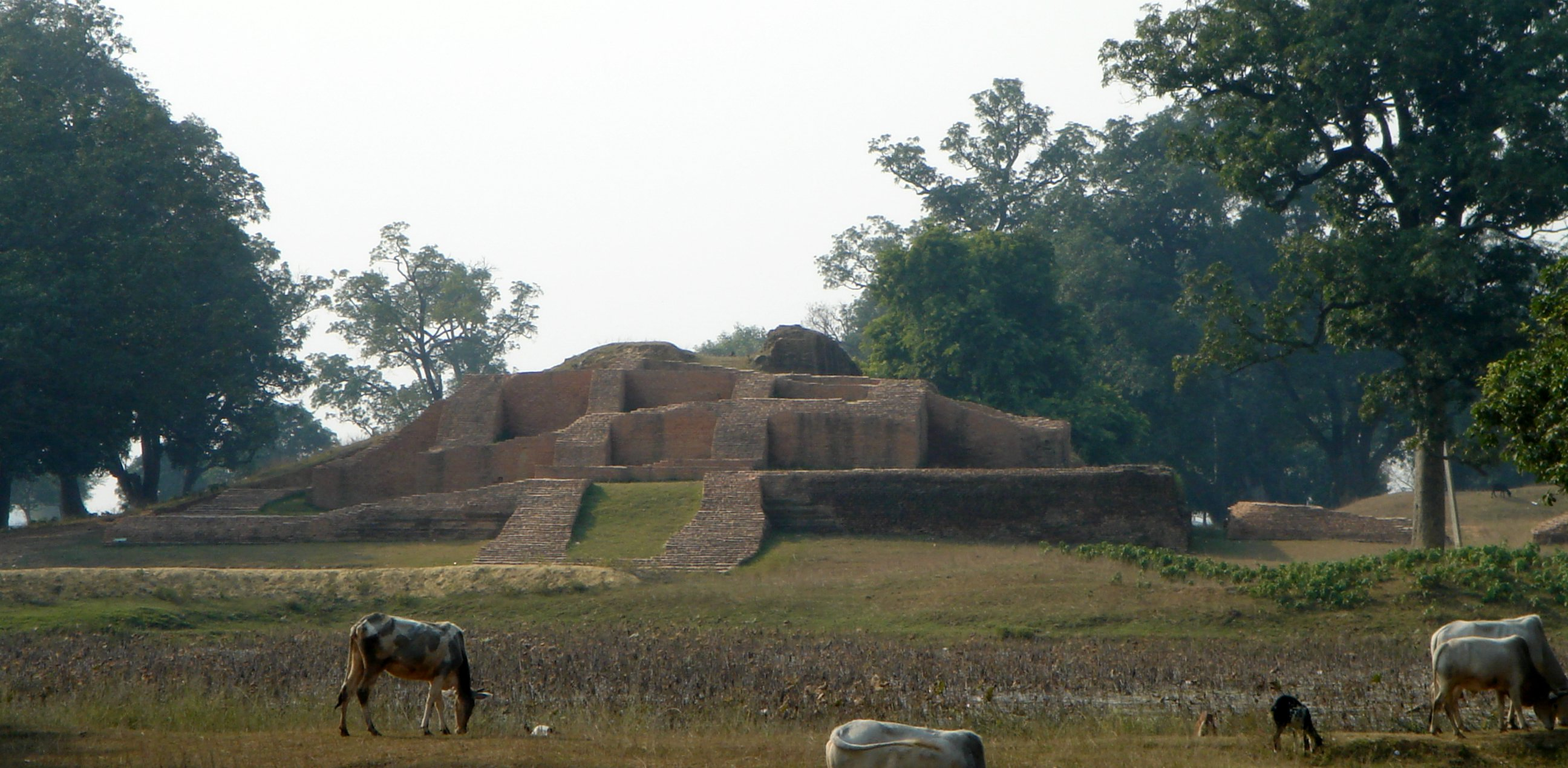
Large stupa at location of Nigrodharama, Nepal

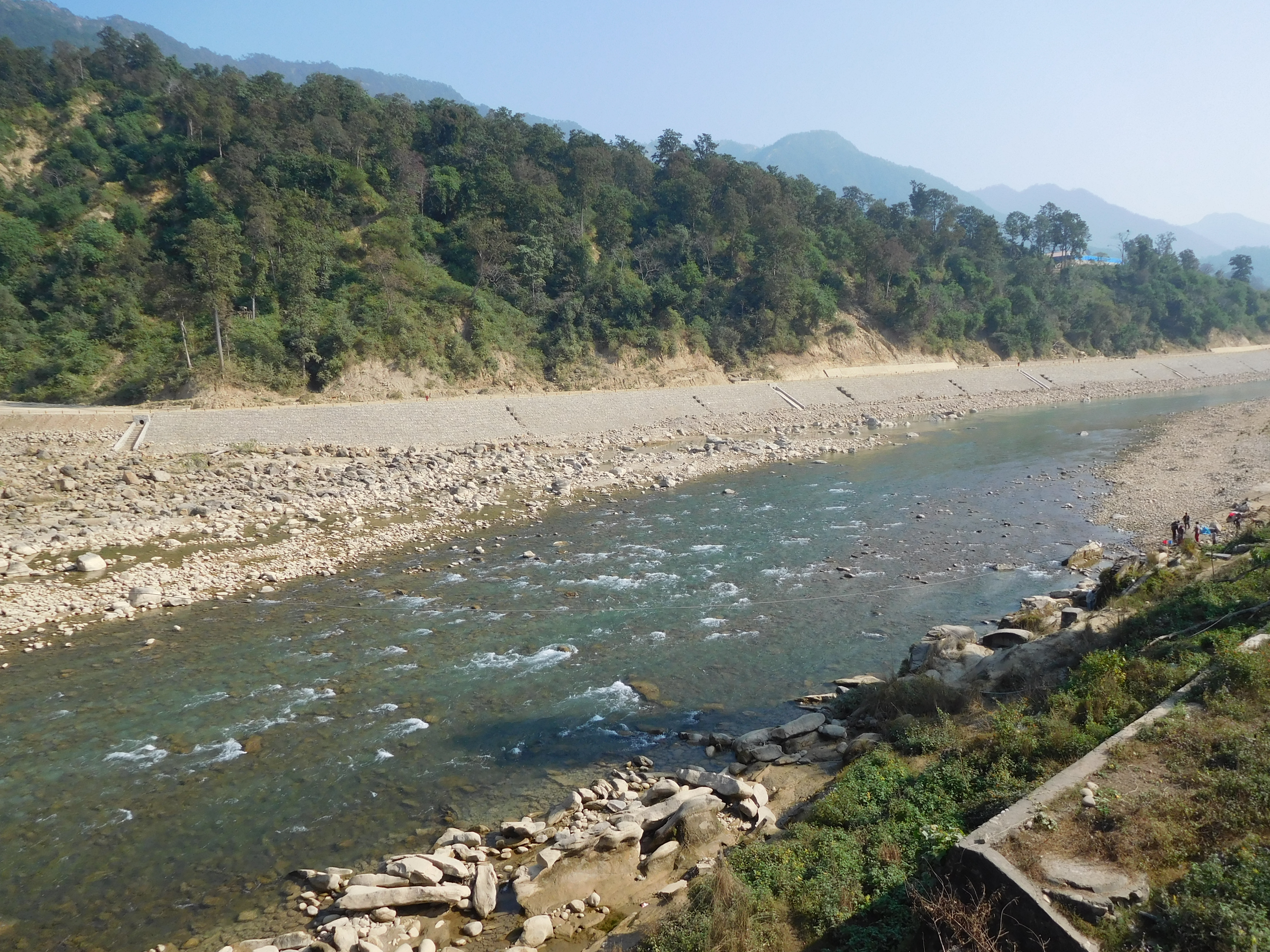
Paleolithic artifacts (1.8 million to 100,000 years ago) site of Babai River in Dang Valley

== Tourism ==
=== Lumbini ===
Lumbini, considered one of the holiest place in Buddhism associated with the Buddha's birth, is a World Heritage Site and the most visited place in Nepal with 1.5 million tourist arriving annually. Lumbini has a number of older temples, including the Mayadevi Temple - a site traditionally considered to be the birthplace of the Buddha, and various new temples funded by Buddhist organizations from various countries that have been completed or are still under construction.

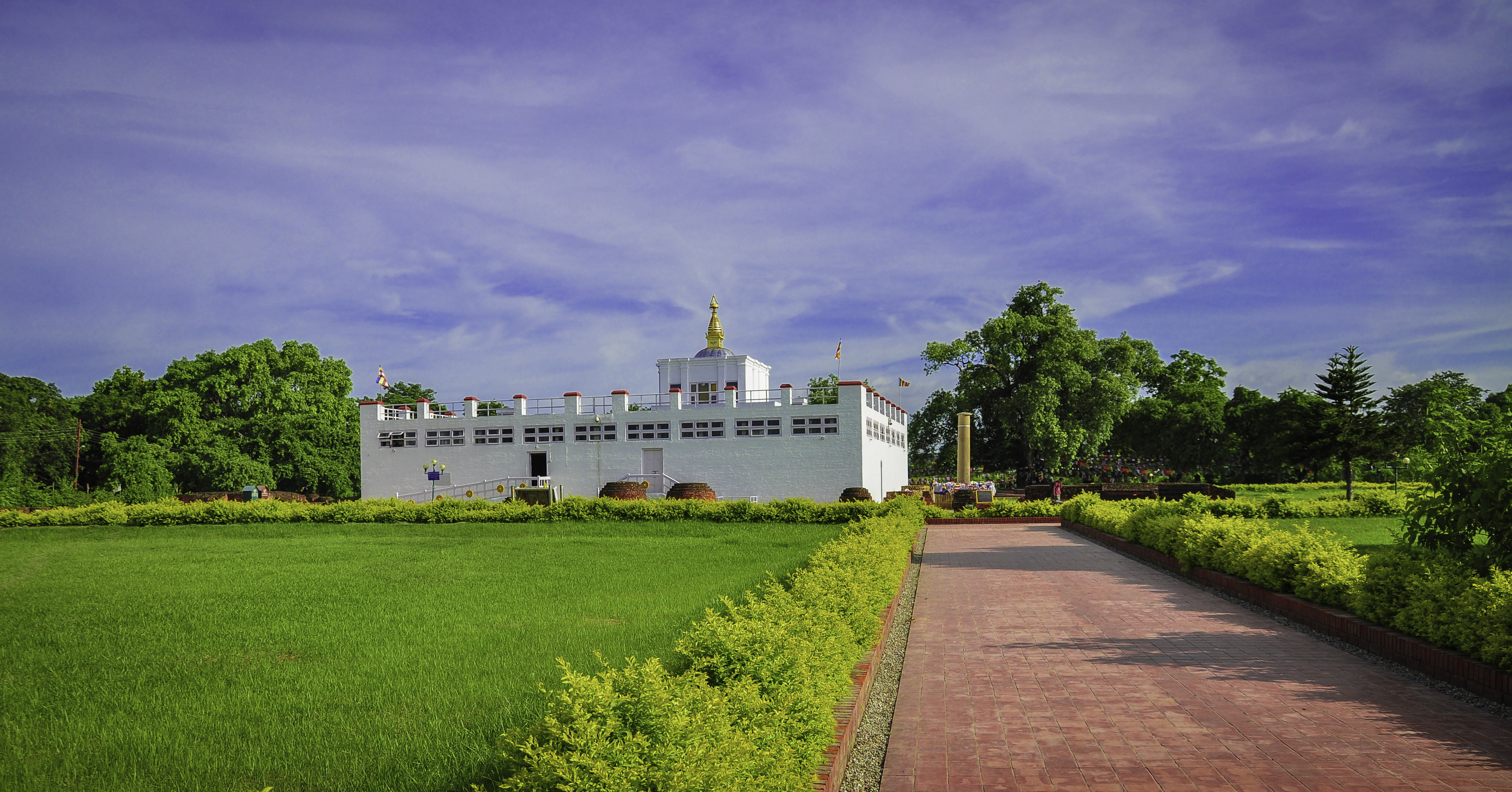
Mayadevi Temple marking the Buddha's birthplace

The ancient ruins of complex structures have been conserved in the area including the Shakya tank – the remains within the Mayadevi Temple with brick structures and cross-wall system that have been dated from the 3rd century BC, Ashoka pillar, excavated remains of Buddhist monasteries of the 3rd century BC to the 5th century AD and the remains of Buddhist stupas (memorial shrines) dated between the 3rd century BC to the 15th century AD. In addition to the ruins of ancient monasteries, there is a sacred Bodhi tree and an ancient bathing pond.

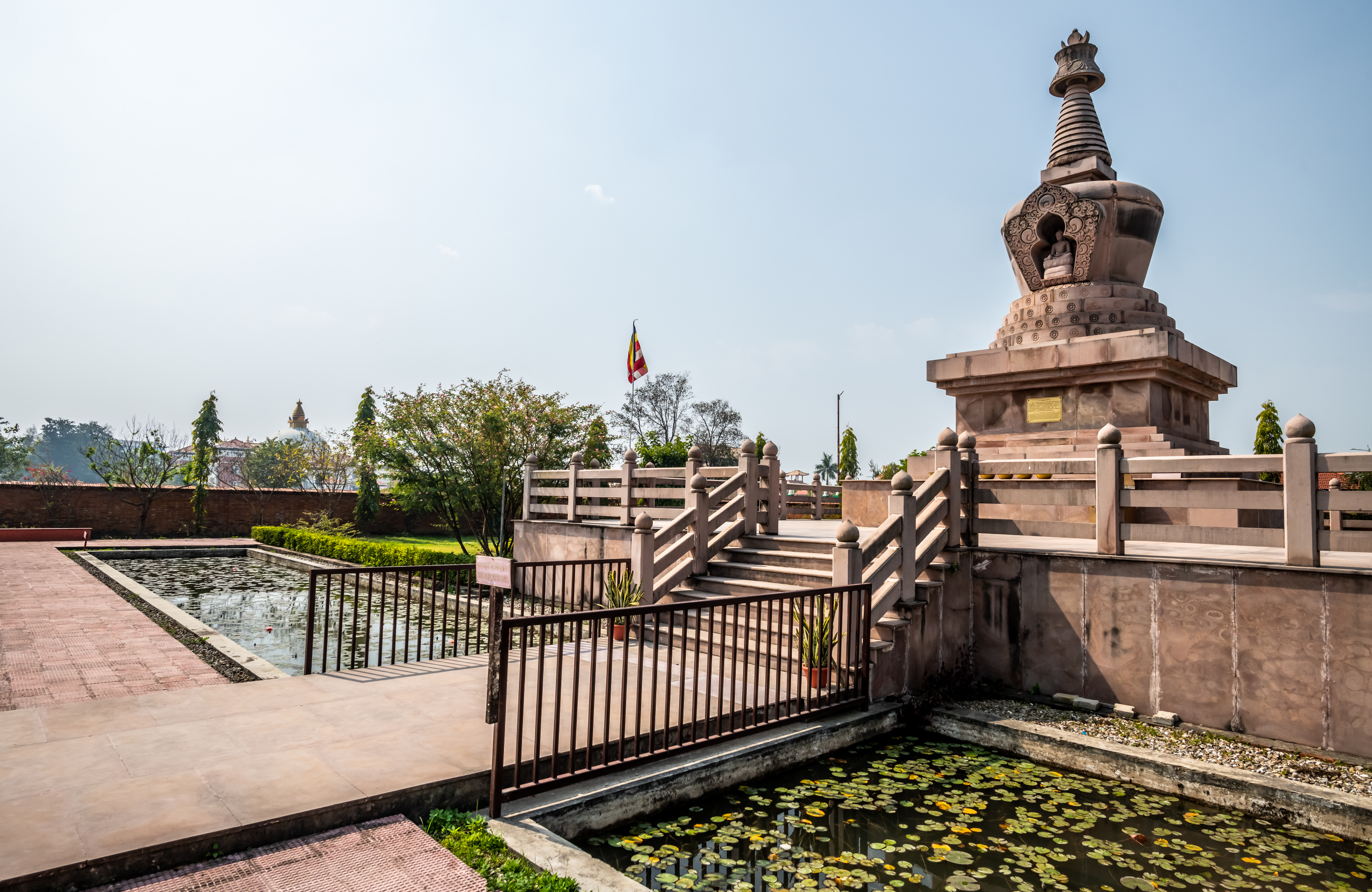
French monastery in Lumbini complex

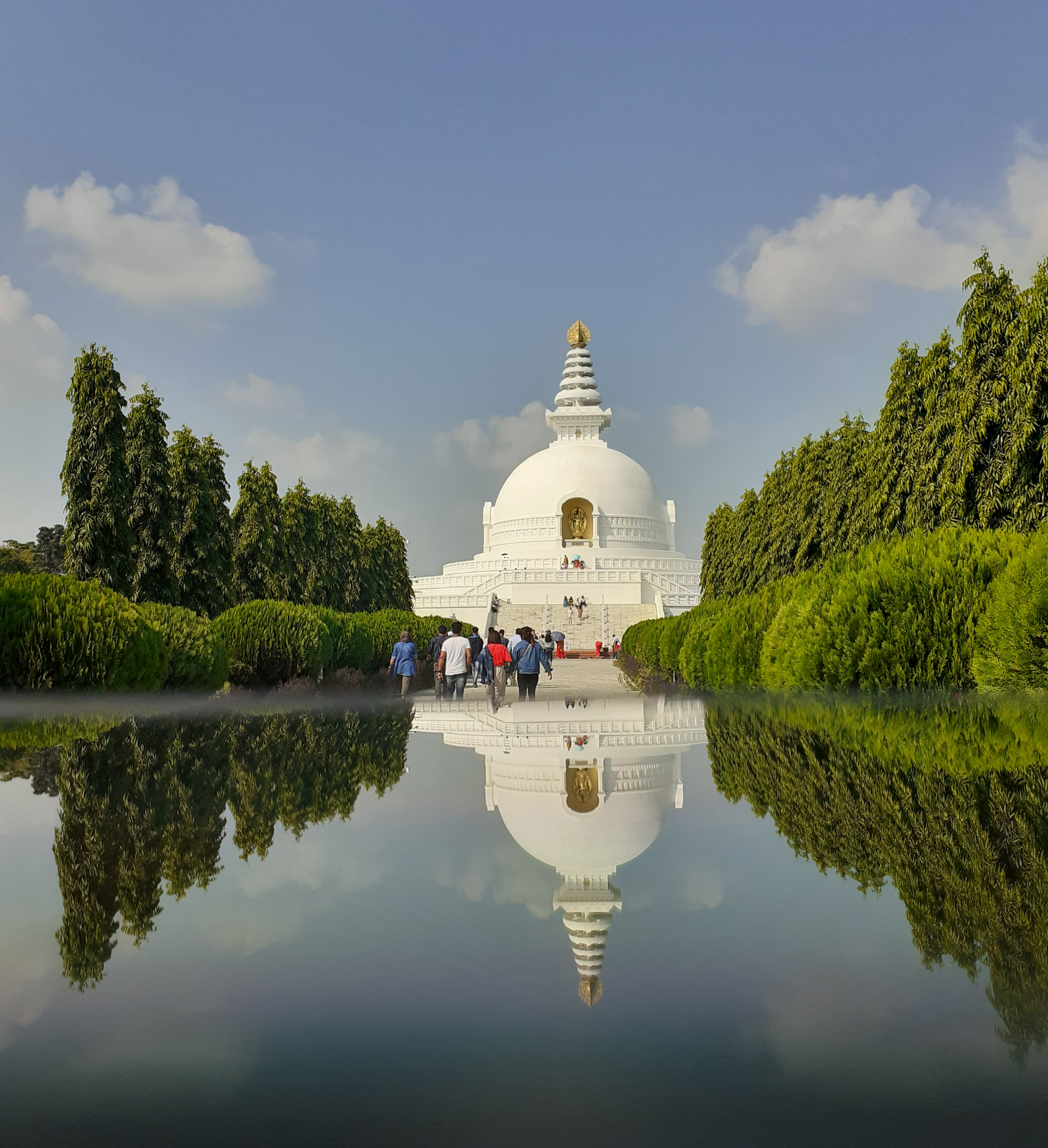
World Peace Pagoda, Lumbini

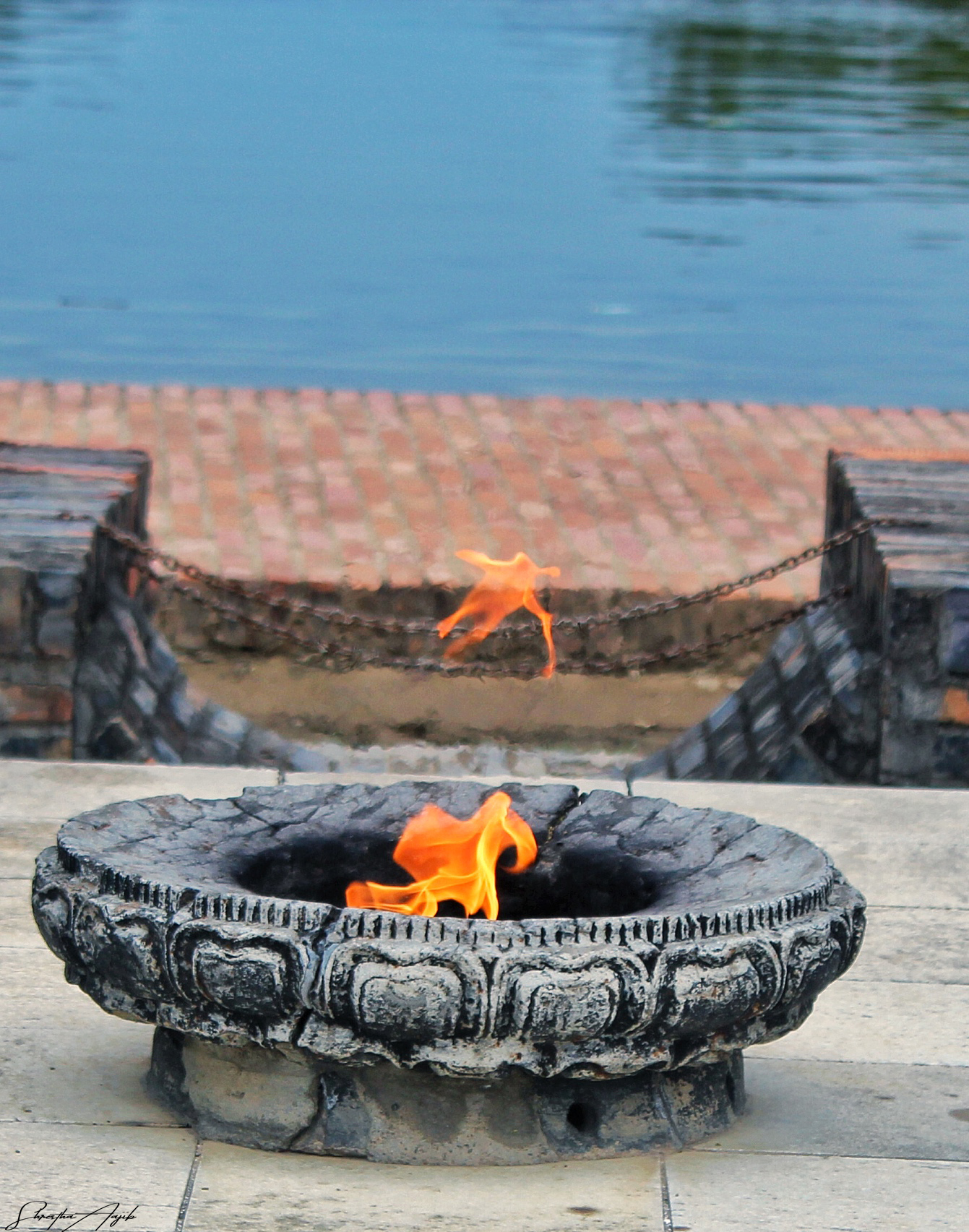
Eternal Peace Flame (Shanti dip), Lumbini

Lumbini complex is divided into three areas: Sacred garden, Monastic zone, Cultural center and new Lumbini village. The sacred garden is the epicenter of the complex which is centered around the birthplace of Buddha and consists of the Mayadevi Temple, the Asoka Pillar, the Marker Stone, the Nativity Sculpture, Sacred Pond (Puskarini), and many structural ruins including Buddhist Viharas & Stupas. The monastic zone is divided into east and west each reflecting two different schools of Buddhism. As a centre of pilgrimage, many countries have established their monasteries in the complex reflecting their own cultural design and spirituality. In the large monastic zone only monasteries can be built; no shops, hotels or restaurants are allowed. The zone is divided into an eastern and western monastic zone, the eastern having the Theravadin monasteries, the western having the Mahayana and Vajrayana monasteries. The Cultural Center consists of museums, Lumbini International Research Institute (LIRI), administration complex etc. and the New Lumbini Village has the World Peace Pagoda and the Lumbini Crane Sanctuary. World Peace Pagoda lies at the northern end of the Lumbini complex and was designed by Japanese buddhists to represent universal peace.

=== Kapilvastu ===
Widely attributed as the hometown of Gautama Buddha, the Kapilvastu District of present-day Nepal has more than 130 archaeological sites, primarily concentrated in Tilaurakot, Kudan, Gotihawa, Niglihawa, Araurakot, Sagarhawa and Sisaniya. The region is also considered the hometown of two previous Buddhas before Gautama: Kakusandha Buddha who was born in Gotihawa and Koṇāgamana Buddha who was born in Niglihawa. Among three Ashoka pillars in Nepal, two are situated in Gotihawa and Niglihawa erected during King Ashoka's visit to ancient Kapilvastu. Tilaurakot, considered the cardinal point of the ancient Shakyan city of Kapilavastu where Gautama Buddha spent 29 years of his lifetime, was added to the World Heritage Tentative List by UNESCO in 1996.

=== Ramagrama ===
After the death of Gautama Buddha, his relics were divided among eight princes out of sixteen mahājanapadās. A Koliyan king of Rāmagrāma (present Parasi district), built a stupa enshrining one relic. Known as the only undisturbed original relic of Buddha in the world, the site of stupa was added to the World Heritage Tentative List by UNESCO on 23 May 1996.

=== Dhaulagiri circuit ===
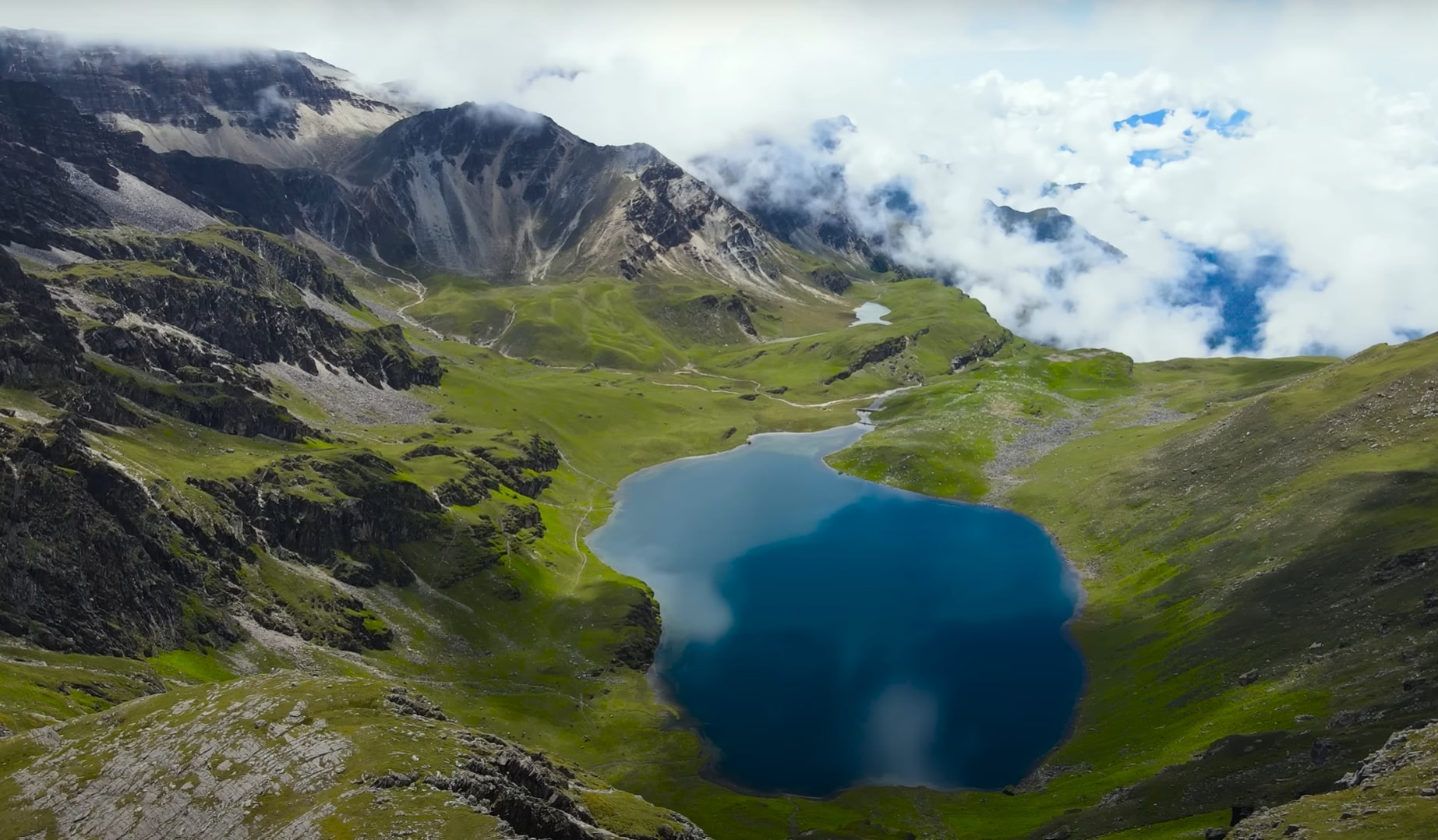
Lower Himalayan lake, known as Sun Daha, in Eastern Rukum

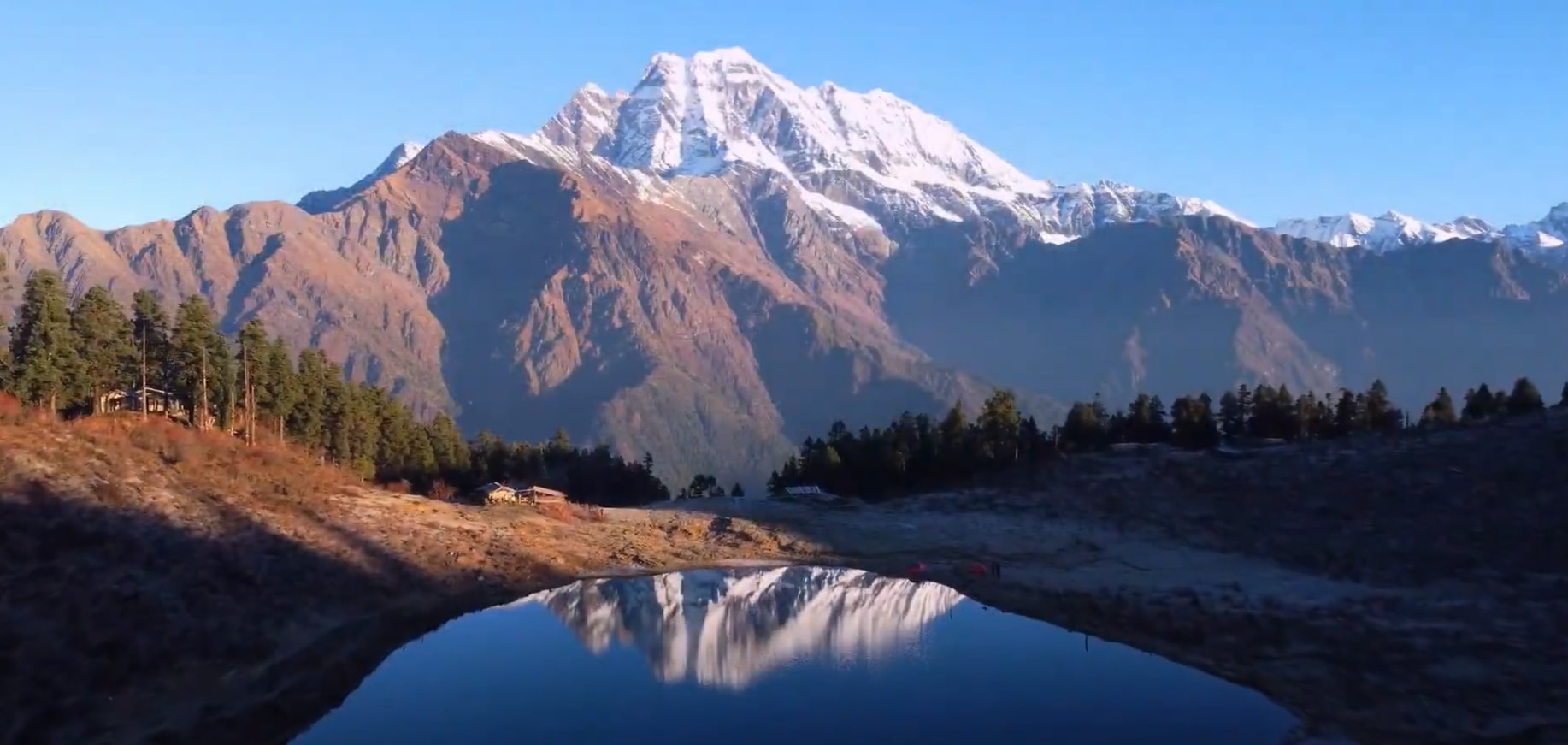
Mount Sisne (Eastern Rukum) along the mountain range

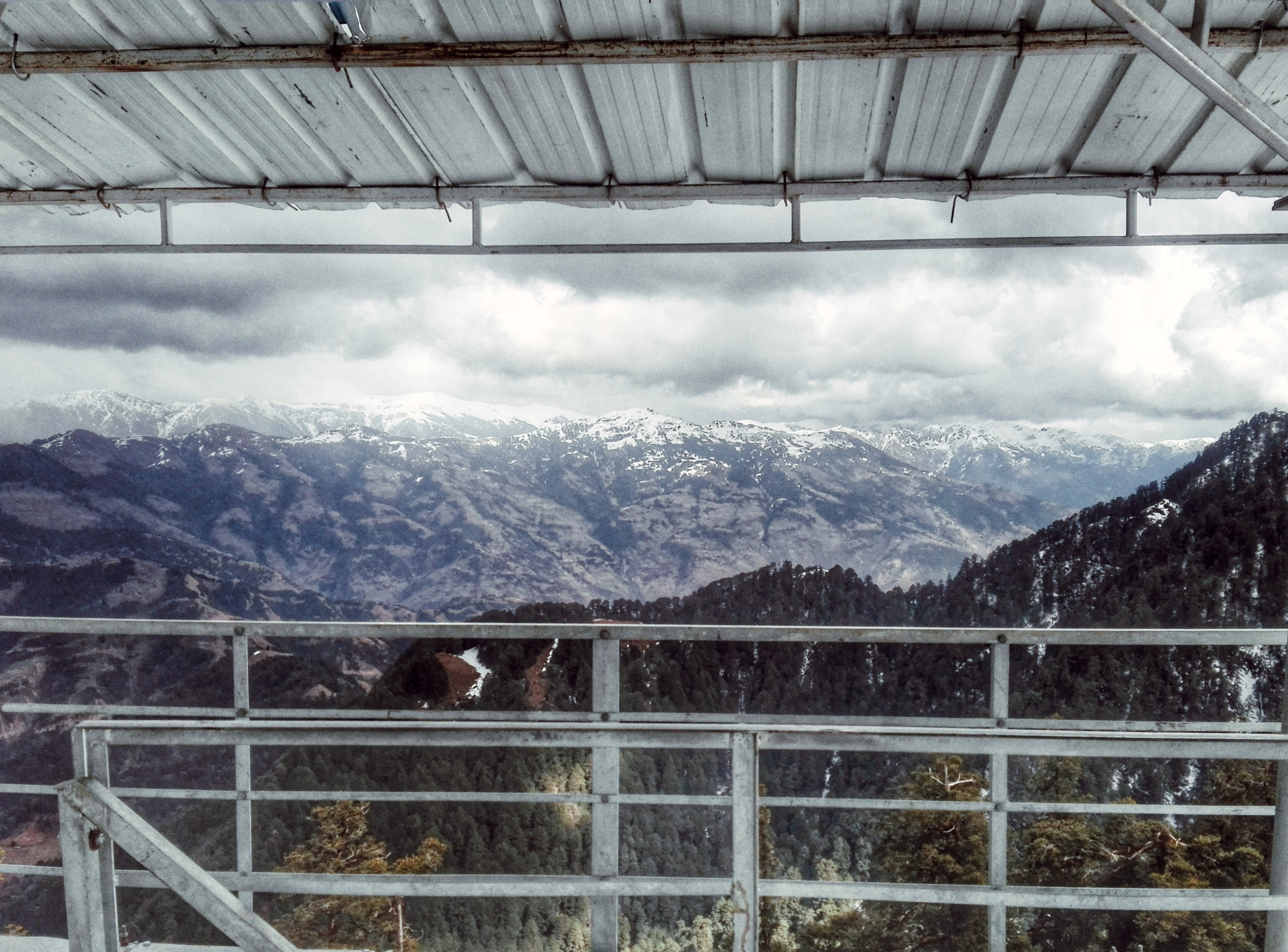
Hills and Himalayas of Northern Lumbini Province

The Dhaulagiri circuit in Eastern Rukum encompasses the Dhaulagiri mountain range of the northern Lumbini Province. The Dhaulagiri mountain range extends from the northwest to the northeast of Eastern Rukum district and then continues eastward to its tallest peak at Dhaulagiri I. Putha Hiunchuli (Dhaulagiri VII), one of the most popular 7,000-metre mountains, was first climbed by British explorer J. O. M. Roberts and Sherpa Ang Nyima in 1954.

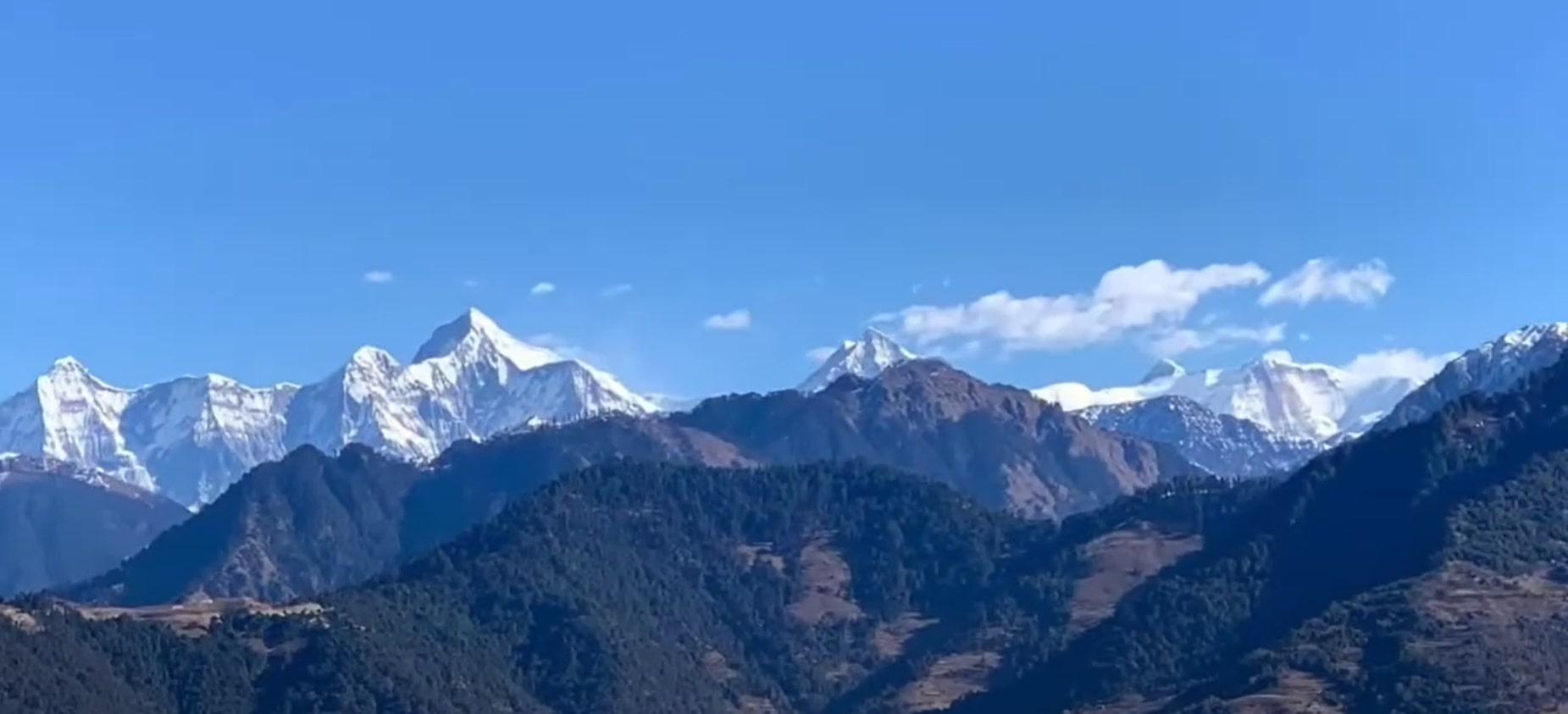
Dhaulagiri Mountain Range in Eastern Rukum features some of the most popular 7,000-meter mountains of the Himalayas

The West Dhaulagiri circuit is a tourist trekking circuit close to the Dhaulagiri mountain range and Magar-majority villages, with a distinct preserved Kham Magar culture of the northern Lumbini province. The circuit's eastern portion is situated along the Dhorpatan reserve of Eastern Rukum, which was designated to preserve high-altitude ecosystems in western Nepal in 1983. The reserve harbours alpine, sub-alpine and high temperate vegetation and 137 species of birds. Endangered animals in the reserve include the musk deer, wolf, red panda, cheer pheasant and danphe.

=== National Parks ===
Bardiya National Park is the largest national park in the lowland Terai, covering 968 square kilometres. It was established in 1976 to protect the representative ecosystem, habitats of tigers and their prey species. As a beautiful, unspoiled wilderness of sal forest, grassland, and alluvial washes cut by the many fingers of the Karnali River, it is a popular tourist destination, offering elephant rides and wilderness sight-seeing of Gangetic dolphins, tigers, rhinos and elephants.

In 1997, a buffer zone of 327 square kilometres surrounding the park was declared, consisting of forests and private lands. The buffer zone is jointly managed by the local communities and the park and community development and resource management is carried out jointly.

The Babai valley, which is rich in biodiversity, was added to the park in 1984. The zone has wooded grassland and riverine forest and its water is home to Gharial crocodile. More than 30 different mammals, 513 species of birds and several species of snakes, lizard and fishes have been recorded in the park area.

A tiger monitoring study conducted (July 2016) in Bardiya National Park in Nepal's Terai Arc Landscape has estimated 56 wild tigers, an increase of six from the 2013 estimate for the national park. —WWF

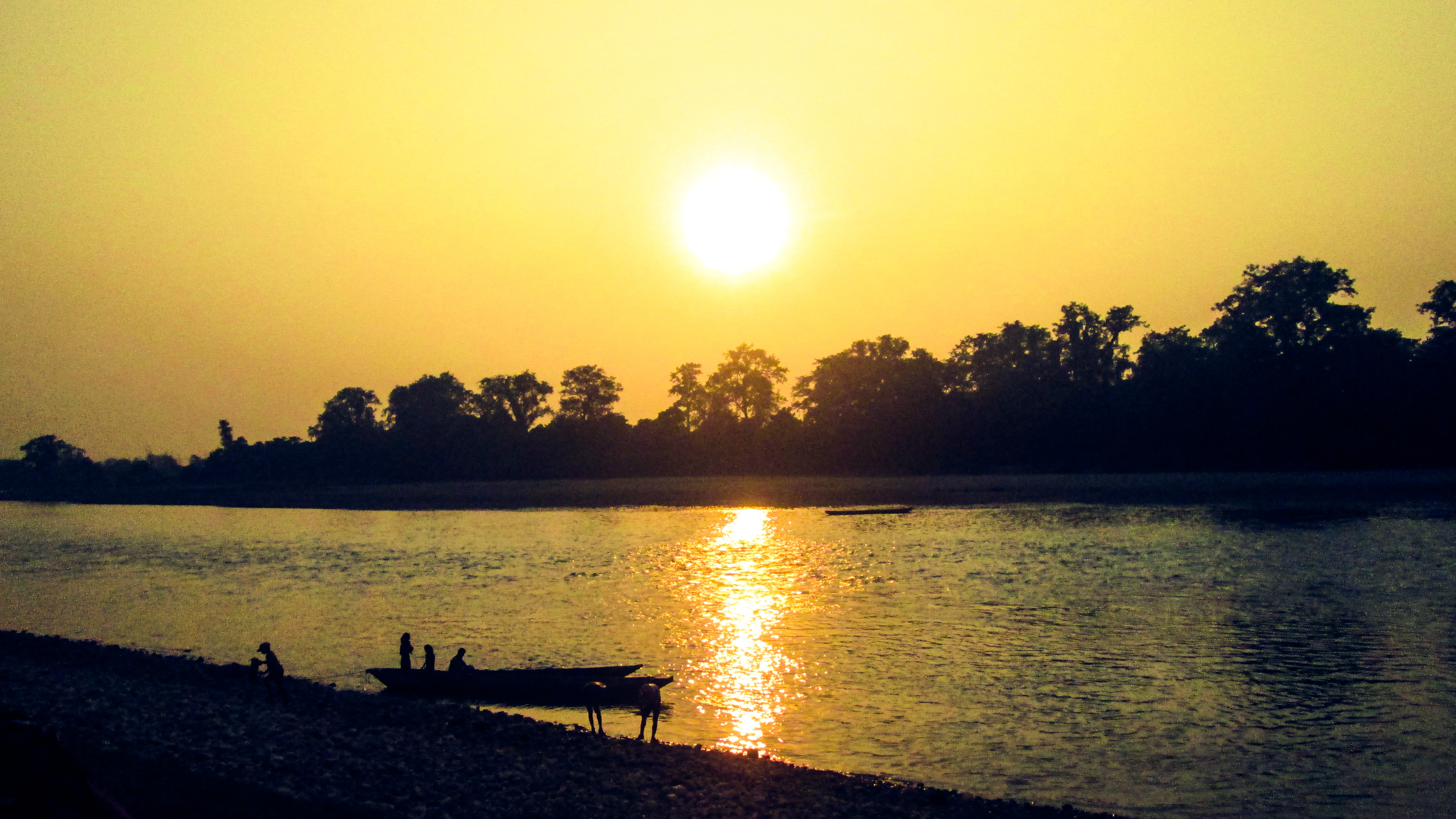
Sunset at Bardiya National Park

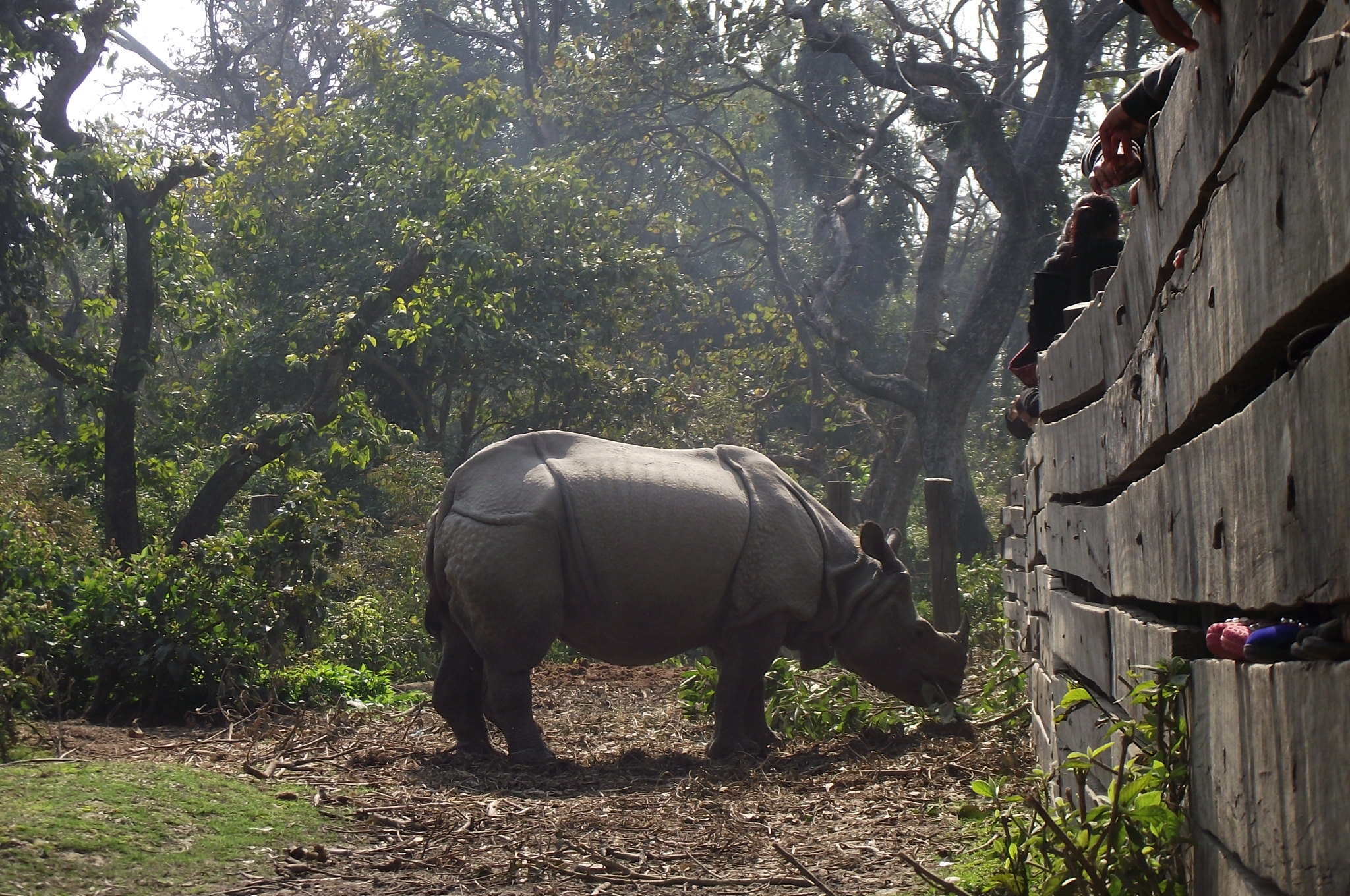
One horned Rhino, Bardiya National Park

Banke National Park, adjacent to the Bardiya National Park with the coherent protected area of 1,518 km^{2} (586 sq mi), represents the Tiger Conservation Unit (TCU). The national park was established in 2010 and is a protected area of tiger and four-horned antelopes. The park extends over 550 square kilometers in Banke district of the province. Banke National Park is connected with Bardiya National Park in the west and wildlife sanctuary and forests of India in the south. The protected zone is an important component of Terai Arc Landscape (TAL) that provides habitat for tigers. The park has eight ecosystem types: Sal forest, deciduous Riverine forest, savannahs and grasslands, mixed hardwood forest, flood plain community, Bhabar and foothills of Chure range. It is home to 124 plants, 34 mammals, more than 300 birds, 24 reptiles, 7 amphibians and 58 fish species. Under the National Parks and Wildlife Conservation Act 1973, 3 species of mammals (tiger, striped hyaena, four-horned antelope), 4 species of birds (giant hornbill, black stork, Bengal florican, and lesser florican) and 2 species of reptiles (gharial crocodile and python) are protected in the park.

=== Cultural Heritage ===
Religious sites

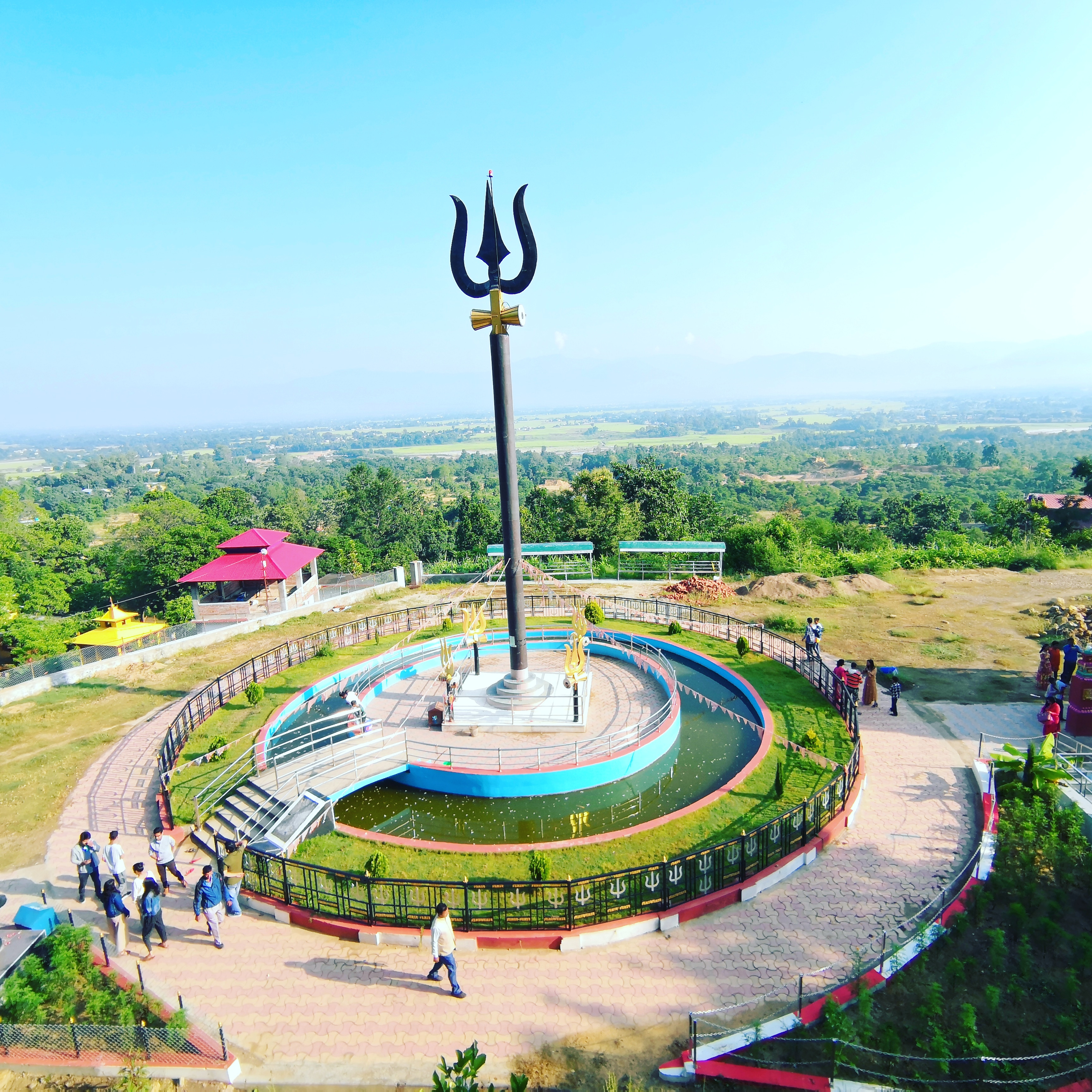
World's largest trident (Trishula) in Dang valley believed to be where five Pandavas brother prayed to Lord Shiva

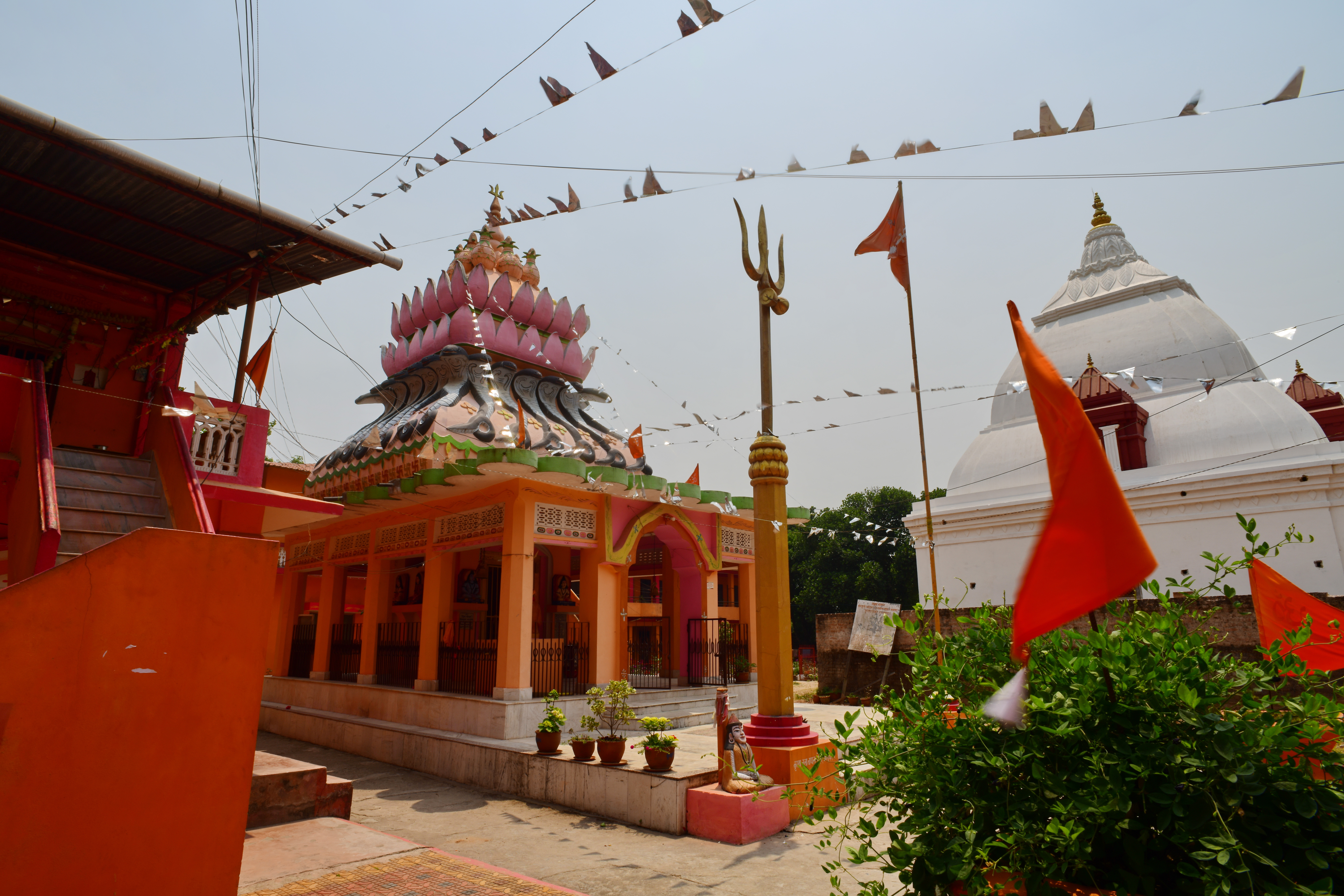
Ancient Gorakhnath Temple in Dang district

The culture of the province has been shaped by multi-religious and multi-ethnic demography as well as the historical development of the Indian sub-continent. Hinduism, the dominant religion of the province and the cultural sacred sites related to it, are prevalent throughout the province. Hinduism flourished overwhelmingly in Dang valley where the cultural centers of the Hindu Nath tradition connected to Yogi Gorakhnath were established long before the creation of modern Nepal. A prominent Gorakhnath temple in Dang district, also known as Ratnanath temple, remained an ancient temple which was respected and protected by the ruling kings of the region throughout - including the later kings of the Shah dynasty.

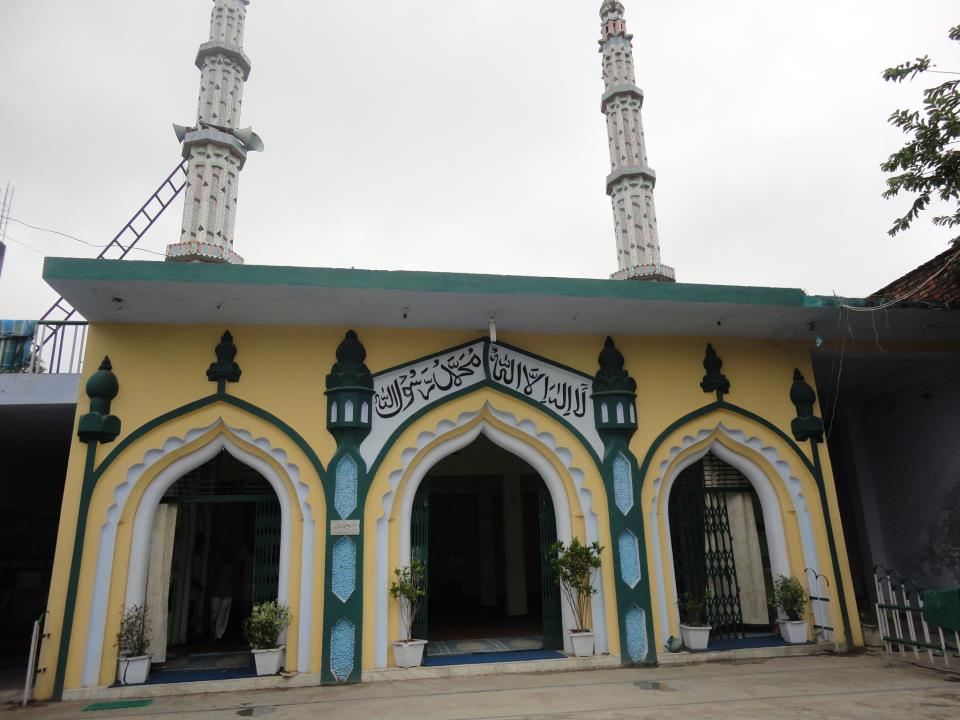
Jama Masjid Rahmaniya, one of the oldest mosque of Nepal

Further popular Hindu sites in Dang district include Ambikeshwori Temple with a deity of Shiva and Goddess Sati Devi; and Pandaveswor temple which has the world's largest trident and believed to be where the five Pandavas brother prayed to Lord Shiva. Other prominent temples of the province include Bhairabsthan Temple of Palpa where Lord Bhairava is worshipped as a deity and Swargadwari temple of Pyuthan which has the deities of Shiva and Vishnu.

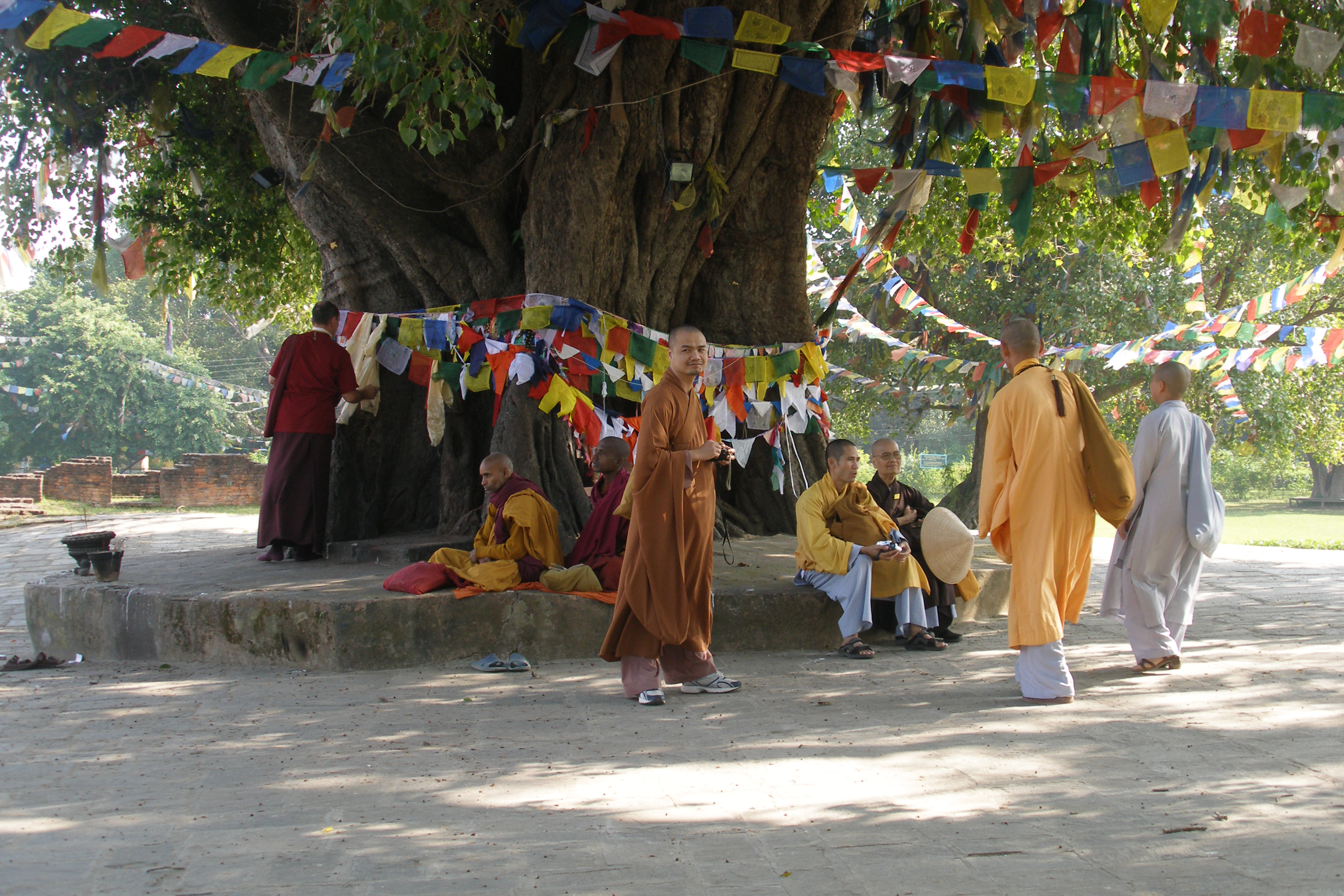
Buddhist pilgrims resting on a tree in Lumbini

Islam, the second-most followed religion of the province, is mostly distributed in the southern districts bordering India. Kapilvastu and Banke districts have one of the largest Muslim population of Nepal and along with Rupandehi, constitute almost half of all the Muslims in Nepal. One of the oldest mosque of Nepal established in 1950 AD, Jama Masjid Rahmaniya, is situated in Rupandehi District.

Within and around Lumbini, sacred sites related to the birth and childhood of Gautama Buddha are pilgrimage centers for Buddhists throughout the world. Lumbini Development Trust, an autonomous and non-profit organization manages the Buddhist sites in Lumbini and the master plan is initiated together with the United Nations to ensure long-term safeguarding of the archeological sites of global importance.

Rani Mahal

After being forced to drop his royal titles, General Khadga Shumsher was sent to Palpa as a Commander in Chief of Nepal where his beloved youngest wife, Rani Tej Kumari Devi, died. The General constructed a grand palace and named it after his wife as Rani Mahal ("Queen's Palace") in 1893 AD. He also named the nearby forest around the palace as Rani ban ("Queen's forest"). The palace is at the banks of the Kali Gandaki River.

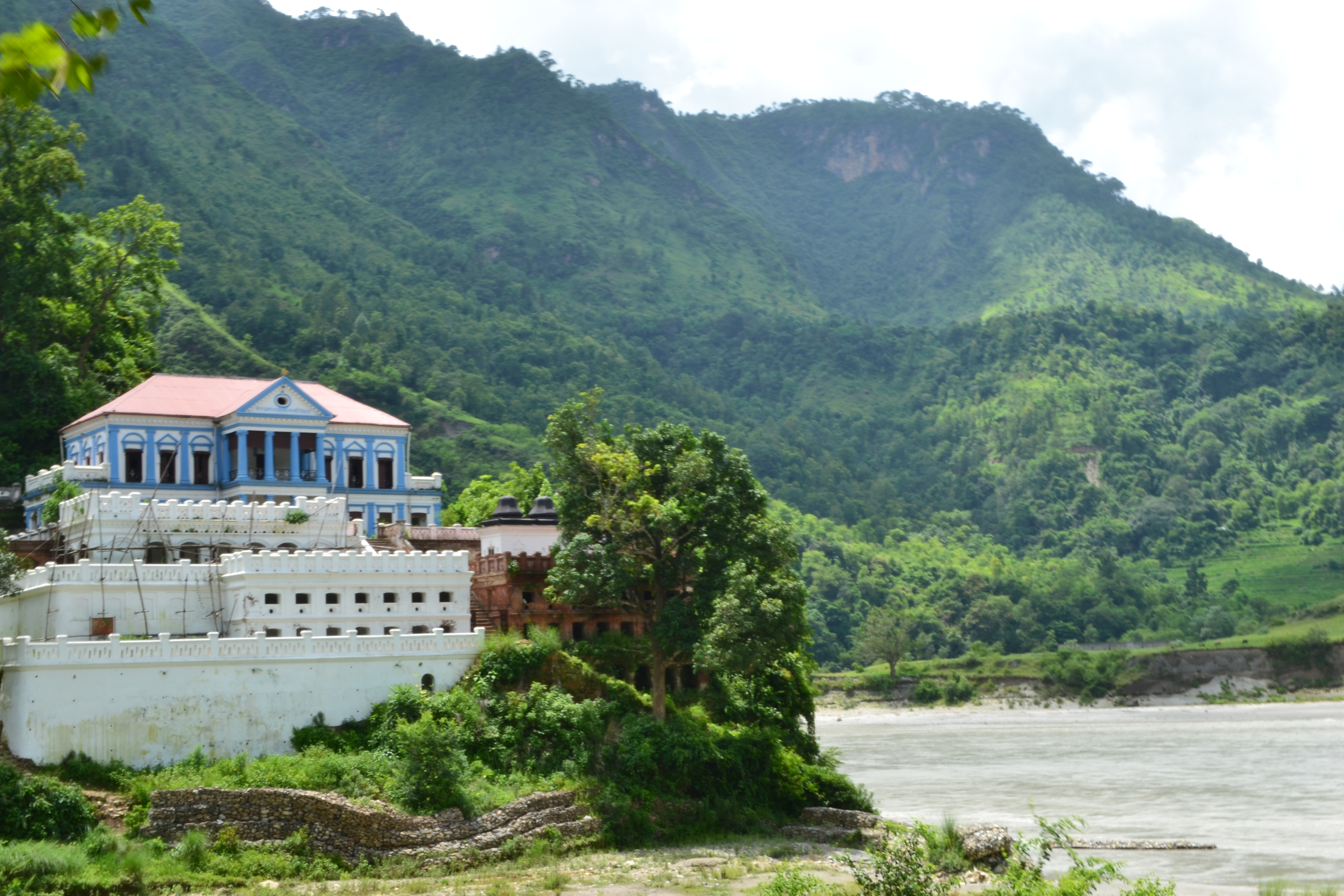
Rani Mahal at Palpa

Supa Deurali Temple

Supa Deurali Temple in Arghakhanchi

Supa Deurali Temple is a Hindu temple located in Sandhikharka municipality, Arghakhanchi district of Nepal. It lies at an altitude of about 4,500 feet. Supadevi is considered to fulfill the wishes of devotees. In addition to goddess Bhagavati, there are idols of Ganesh, Mahakali, Mahalaxmi and Shiva in the temple. The donation received from the devotee is used to run two local schools.

== List of monuments in Lumbini Province ==
- List of monuments in Arghakhanchi District
- List of monuments in Banke District
- List of monuments in Bardiya District
- List of monuments in Dang District
- List of monuments in Eastern Rukum District (see list of monuments in the former Rukum District)
- List of monuments in Gulmi District
- List of monuments in Kapilvastu District
- List of monuments in Palpa District
- List of monuments in Parasi District (see list of monuments in the former Nawalparasi District)
- List of monuments in Pyuthan District
- List of monuments in Rolpa District
- List of monuments in Rupandehi District

== Statistics ==
=== Arrivals ===
This statistic shows the number of tourist arrivals by year:

Year	Tourist Arrivals	% Change
2024	1,172,304	17.36 ▲
2023	998,938	10.5 ▲
2022	~903,883	10.5 ▲
2021	463,963	65.74 ▲
2020	279,927	~82 ▼
2019	1,558,326	---

== See also ==
- Maya Devi Temple
- World Peace Pagoda, Lumbini
- Ashoka Pillar of Lumbini
- Lumbini Crane Sanctuary
