= List of monuments in Lumbini Zone =

Lumbini Zone was one of the fourteen zones of Nepal, comprising six districts, namely, Arghakhanchi, Gulmi, Kapilvastu, Nawalparasi, Palpa and Rupandehi. Here is district wise List of Monuments which is in the Lumbini Zone.This is the place god Gautum Buddha was born. It is near to one district name Butwal and another side India

== Lumbini Zone ==
- List of monuments in Arghakhanchi District
- List of monuments in Gulmi District
- List of monuments in Kapilvastu District
- List of monuments in Nawalparasi District
- List of monuments in Palpa District
- List of monuments in Rupandehi District
