= List of monuments in Rapti Zone =

Rapti Zone was one of the fourteen zones of Nepal, comprising five districts, namely, Dang, Pyuthan, Rolpa, Rukum and Salyan. Here is district wise List of Monuments which is in the Rapti Zone.

== Rapti Zone ==
- List of monuments in Dang District
- List of monuments in Pyuthan District
- List of monuments in Rolpa District
- List of monuments in Rukum District
- List of monuments in Salyan District
