= List of monuments in Bardiya, Nepal =

This is a list of monuments in Bardiya District, Nepal as officially recognized by and available through the website of the Department of Archaeology, Nepal.

ID	Name	Type	Location	District	Coordinates	Image
NP-BAR-01	Baglamukhi temple		Gulariya	Bardiya		Baglamukhi temple Upload Photo
NP-BAR-02	Kotahi Temple			Bardiya		Upload Photo Upload Photo
NP-BAR-03	Thakurdwara Temple			Bardiya		Upload Photo Upload Photo
NP-BAR-04	Bed Byash Baatika			Bardiya		Upload Photo Upload Photo

== See also ==
- List of monuments in Lumbini Province
- List of monuments in Nepal
