= List of monuments in Lumbini Province =

Lumbini Province, formerly Province No. 5 (Nepali: प्रदेश नं. ५), is one of the seven federal provinces of Nepal established by the country's new constitution of 20 September 2015, comprising twelve districts, namely Arghakhanchi, Banke, Bardiya, Dang, Eastern Rukum, Gulmi, Kapilvastu, Parasi, Palpa, Pyuthan, Rolpa and Rupandehi. There are many categorized monuments sites in Lumbini Province.

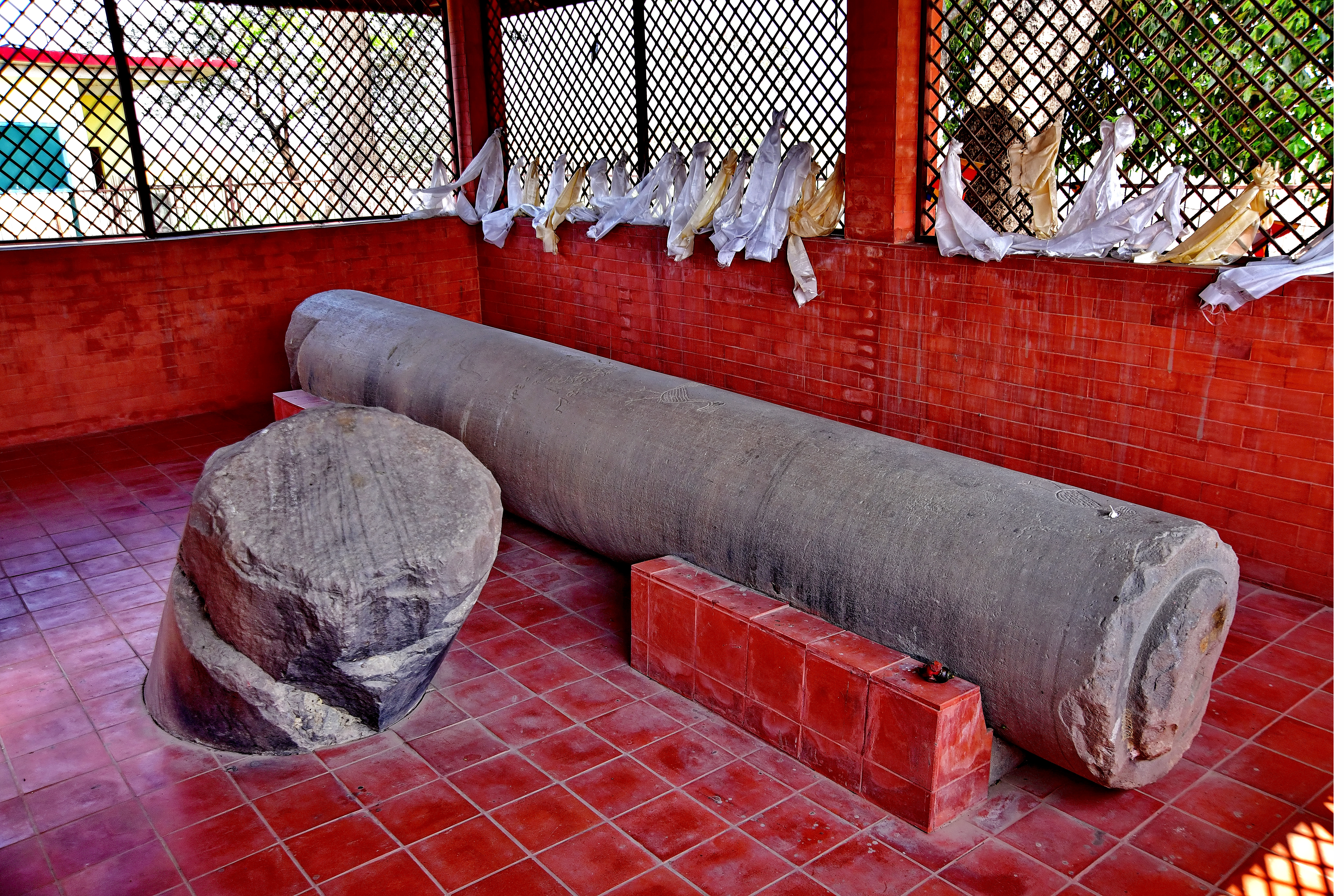
Asoka Pillar of Niglihawa

== Lists per district of Lumbini Province ==
- List of monuments in Arghakhanchi District
- List of monuments in Banke District
- List of monuments in Bardiya District
- List of monuments in Dang District
- List of monuments in Eastern Rukum District (see list of monuments in the former Rukum District)
- List of monuments in Gulmi District
- List of monuments in Kapilvastu District
- List of monuments in Palpa District
- List of monuments in Parasi District (see list of monuments in the former Nawalparasi District)
- List of monuments in Pyuthan District
- List of monuments in Rolpa District
- List of monuments in Rupandehi District
