= Gulariya =

Gulariya गुलरिया
- Municipality (नगरपालिका)
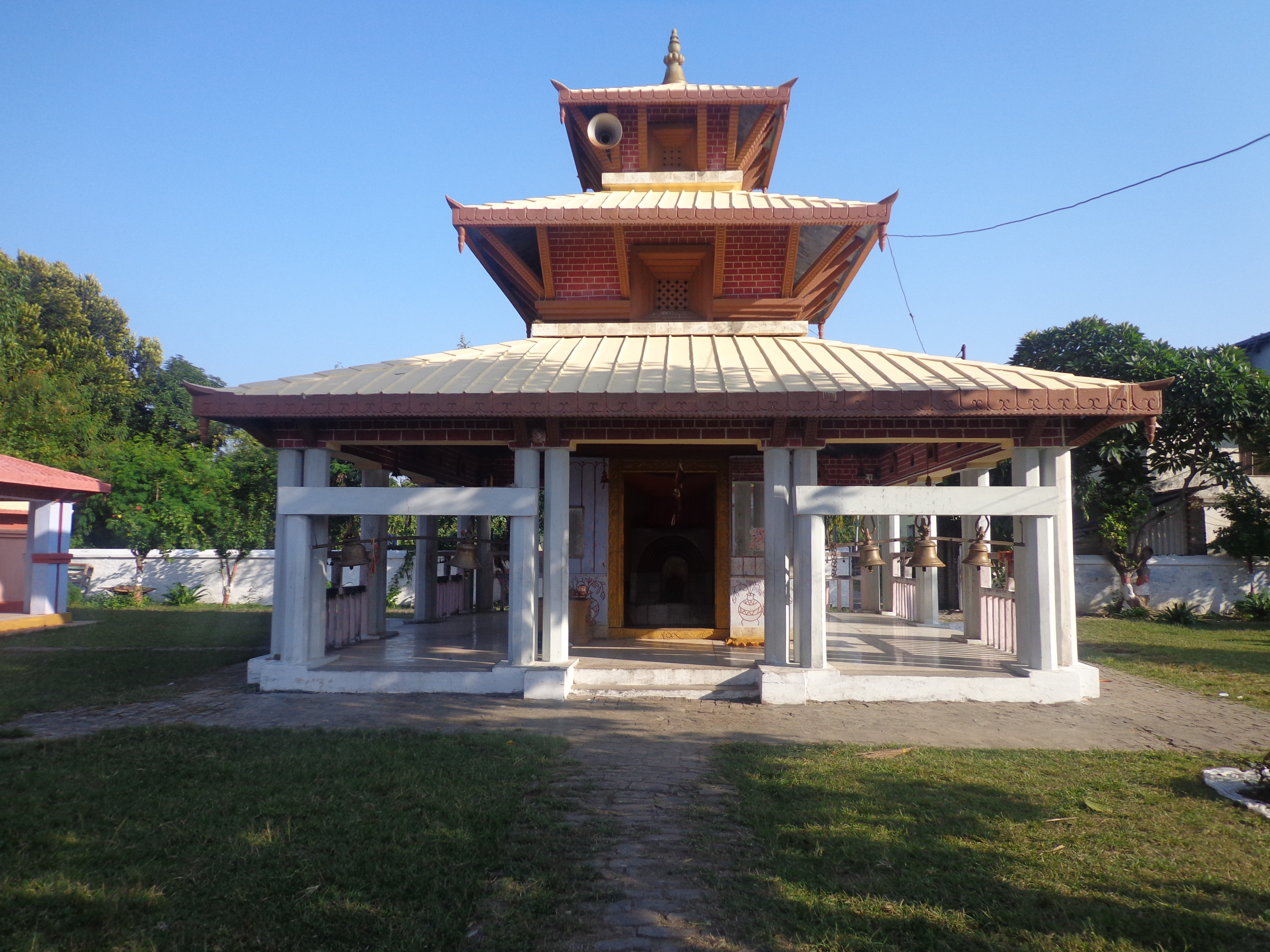
- The photo shows the Baglamukhi Temple which is the most popular temple among people in the Bardiya District region.

- Location in Lumbini Province Gulariya (Nepal)
- Coordinates: 28°13′59″N 81°19′59″E
- Country: Nepal
- Province: Lumbini Province
- District: Bardiya
- Municipality: Gulariya
- Incorporated: January 24, 1997

Government
  - Mayor: Mukti Nath Yadav (NC)
  - Deputy Mayor: Sushila Giri (NC)

Population (2011)
  - Total: 55,747
- Time zone: UTC+5:45 (NST)
- Postal code: 21800
- Area code: 084
- Website: gulariyamun.gov.np

Gulariya (Nepali: गुलरिया) is a municipality and headquarters of Bardiya District in Lumbini Province of south-western Nepal. It is located in the plains of the Terai region near the southern border with the Bahraich district, Uttar Pradesh state of India. It is 35 kilometers west of Nepalgunj and about 10 km north of Murtiha Transit or railway station, India.

It lies at an elevation of 187 meters.

== Overview ==
Murtiha road or Bhansar road is the main and oldest business hub having book-shops, cosmetic-shops, hardware dealers and home appliances distributors among others. This area is also famous for the various fancy shops alongside of the road. Apart from this area, Radha-krishna chok is another Business area holding banks as well as various hotels. There is also better education facility in the city which are in full operation. Several Private-Boarding as well as Governmental Schools are established in the city like Sunrise Secondary Boarding School, Bageshwory Secondary Boarding School, Janjyoti Higher-Secondary Boarding School, Little-Heaven English Academy, Baglamukhi School among others. For higher studies, Babai Multiple Campus affiliated to Mid-western University is also located here.

== Demographics ==
At the time of the 2011 Nepal census, Gulariya Municipality had a population of 68,164. Of these, 38.7% spoke Awadhi, 23.0% Nepali, 22.0% Tharu, 11.5% Urdu, 1.7% Bhojpuri, 1.4% Maithili, 0.4% Magar, 0.4% Newar, 0.3% Doteli, 0.3% Santali, 0.2% Hindi, 0.1% Gurung, 0.1% Sherpa and 0.1% other languages as their first language.

In terms of ethnicity/caste, 24.5% were Tharu, 11.2% Musalman, 9.1% Yadav, 8.1% Hill Brahmin, 7.0% Mallaha, 6.1% Chhetri, 5.5% Lodh, 4.2% Chamar/Harijan/Ram, 3.9% Kami, 2.2% Magar, 1.5% Dusadh/Paswan/Pasi, 1.5% other Terai, 1.3% Kurmi, 1.2% Damai/Dholi, 1.1% Dhobi, 1.0% Kathabaniyan, 1.0% Thakuri, 0.9% Terai Brahmin, 0.8% Hajjam/Thakur, 0.8% Halwai, 0.8% Newar, 0.7% other Dalit, 0.7% Kayastha, 0.7% Teli, 0.5% Koiri/Kushwaha, 0.4% Sanyasi/Dasnami, 0.3% Bengali, 0.3% Gaderi/Bhedihar, 0.3% Gurung, 0.3% Santal, 0.2% Kewat, 0.2% Kori, 0.1% Badhaee, 0.1% Gaine, 0.1% Kahar, 0.1% Kalwar, 0.1% Kumal, 0.1% Lohar, 0.1% Musahar, 0.1% Pattharkatta/Kushwadiya, 0.1% Rajbhar, 0.1% Raji, 0.1% Sarki, 0.1% Sherpa, 0.1% Tamang and 0.1% others.

In terms of religion, 87.2% were Hindu, 11.0% Muslim, 1.3% Christian, 0.4% Buddhist and 0.1% others.

In terms of literacy, 59.5% could read and write, 2.5% could only read and 38.0% could neither read nor write.

Nepali is spoken natively by Paharis as well as by people of other ethnicity as the national language and lingua franca. The mother tongue for the older residents is still Awadhi and Tharu language, which is understood and normally spoken by the entire population of the district. Tharu people are considered as the original inhabitants of this area.

== Lifestyle ==
Temperature highly affects the lifestyle of Gulariya. Due to extreme heat in summer season, people wear light cotton clothes and rarely come out during the day time. While in the winter season, the temperature may drop to 6 °C during which people wear thick woollen clothes.

Restaurants in Gulariya are especially famous for their samosas, chaat, golgappas (panipuri), and sekuwa (roasted spiced-meat). Other dishes and delicacies include momos (Nepalese dumplings), biryani, gulab jamun, barfi, ras malai, jalebi, dahibada, and chilled beer.

== Culture and Religion ==
Gulariya city has a diverse culture with people from different faiths living within mixed communities. Hinduism and Islam are two major religions in the city with Hindus comprising larger percentage of the population. Other religions like Buddhism and the Christianity are among in the minorities. People of different ethnicity are known to have traditionally lived together, without any significant conflicts.

== Transport ==
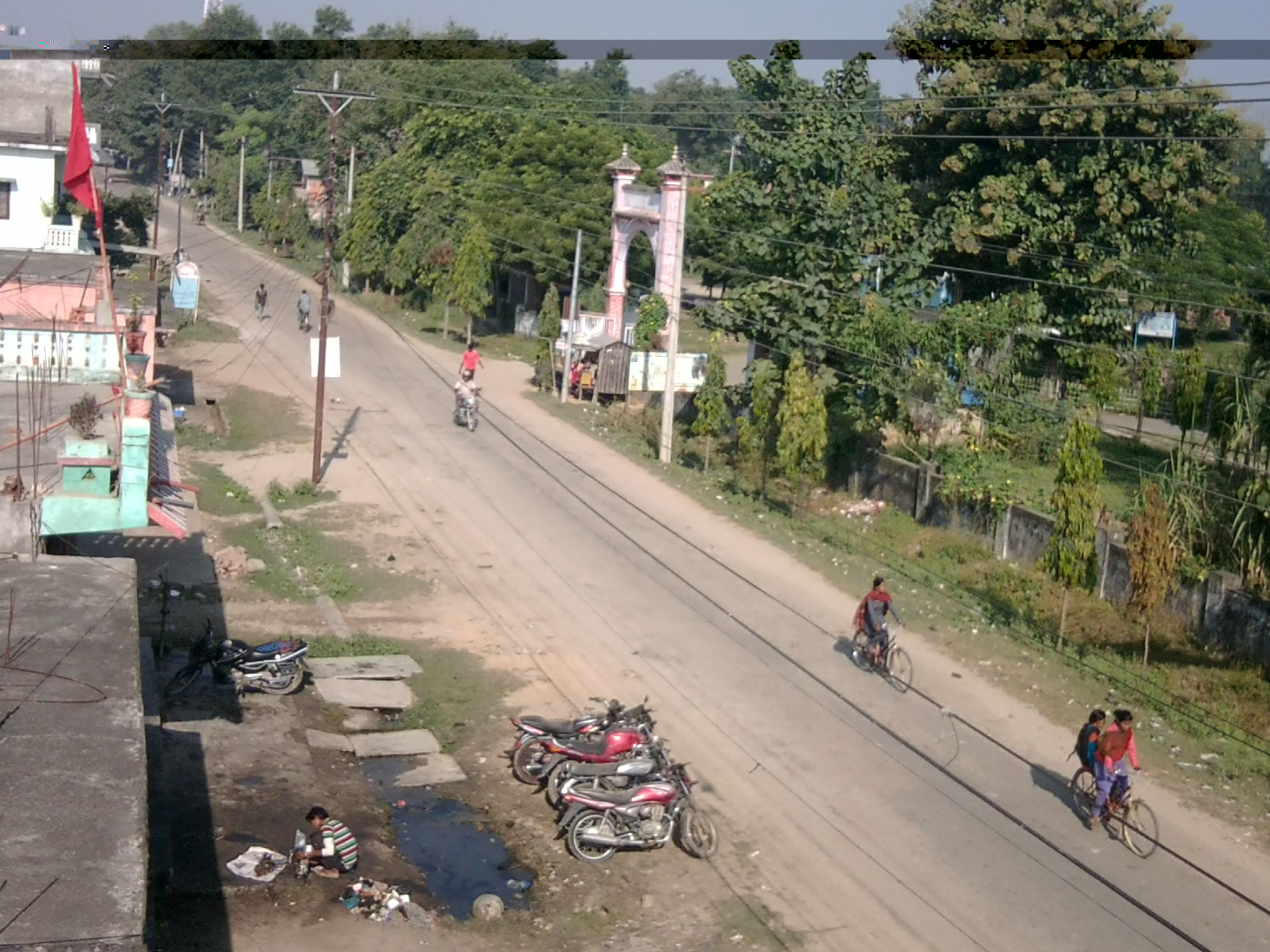
Gulariya Hospital road area

Gulariya has fully operational bus and mini-bus services that reach almost all parts of the western region that connected by roadways, as well as most parts of the eastern region, including all the major hubs in the country. The main hub for buses is Gulariya Buspark, while small transits are located in several other places in the city like Bhansar chok, Police-station road. Short routes are generally covered by micro-buses and mini-buses, while luxury coaches are available for long routes to destinations like Kathmandu, Pokhara, etc. The country's longest highway- Mahendra Highway, is linked from the city center.

A line of Indian Railways reaches Murtiha across the border. It involves train changes at Gonda, Bahraich and Nanpara. For travellers coming in from India it is also possible to take an express train to Lucknow and from there a direct bus to Murtiha. Indian and Nepalese nationals may cross the border without restrictions, however there is a customs checkpoint for goods and third country nationals.

The most common public transport for commuters within the city have long been cycle rickshaws and electric rickshaws. Most common private transport are motorcycles, especially among young adults while bicycles are used by many. Recently the number of automobiles has increased significantly in the city.

== Infrastructure ==
Bardiya District Hospital, located in Gulariya Municipality of Bardiya District, was established in 1940. Known initially as Tri-Juddha Hospital and situated along the Hulaki road, it functions as the primary referral center in the district.

The hospital was upgraded from a district facility to a 50-bed hospital in the fiscal year 2071/2072 to enhance its healthcare services. Despite its limited resources, Bardiya District Hospital has consistently aimed to provide high-quality medical care.

Currently, the hospital's staff roster includes 15 doctors, among them 10 specialists, 4 medical officers, and 1 dental surgeon. Although the hospital expanded to a 50-bed capacity and established 59 staff positions post-upgrade, it faces a staffing shortfall. To mitigate this, the Hospital Development Committee has employed health workers and other staff on a contractual basis to maintain operational services.

Under the oversight of the Lumbini Provincial Government, Bardiya District Hospital offers a comprehensive range of medical services. These encompass outpatient services (except on public holidays), 24/7 emergency and laboratory services, inpatient care, surgical operations, free maternity services, dental treatments, and support for sexual violence victims. Additional services include safe abortion, physiotherapy, endoscopy, sickle cell anemia testing, radiology, gynecological care, and specialized wards for senior citizens. The hospital also provides services with full or partial waivers through its social service unit and offers free tuberculosis screening for children."

There are other crucial infrastructures in Gulariya. They are as follows:

- Gulariya Police Station
- Gulariya Town-hall
- Gulariya District Court
- FNCCI Gulariya Branch

== Climate ==
Gulariya has a sub-tropical climate. Temperatures sometimes exceed 38 °C (102 °F) from April to June. During the rainy season—arriving in June and lasting into September—it is less hot but sometimes very humid. Winter is usually pleasant while the sun is out. It sometimes is foggy and overcast; then it can be chilly with temperatures below 10 °C (41 °F) but no frost.

== Places of interest ==
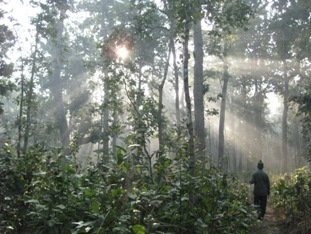
Forest in Bardiya National Park

- Baglamukhi Temple in Gulariya is one of the most important temples for Hindus. It is dedicated to goddess Baglamukhi.
- Kotahi temple and Thakurdwara temple are equally important worship places and is very famous in this region.
- Bed Byash Batika Temple located in Shantitole-8 is one of the popular places to worship lord Krishna and Radha.
- Bardiya National Park is the most famous tourist destination in this region having a total area of 968 km^{2} where people can enjoy Jungle Safari riding on an Elephant's back.
- Karnali River is 60 minutes drive west.

== Sports ==
Cricket and football are the two most popular sports in Gulariya.
