= Baglamukhi Temple, Gulariya =

Temple in Gulariya, Nepal

Baglamukhi Temple बगलामुखी मन्दिर
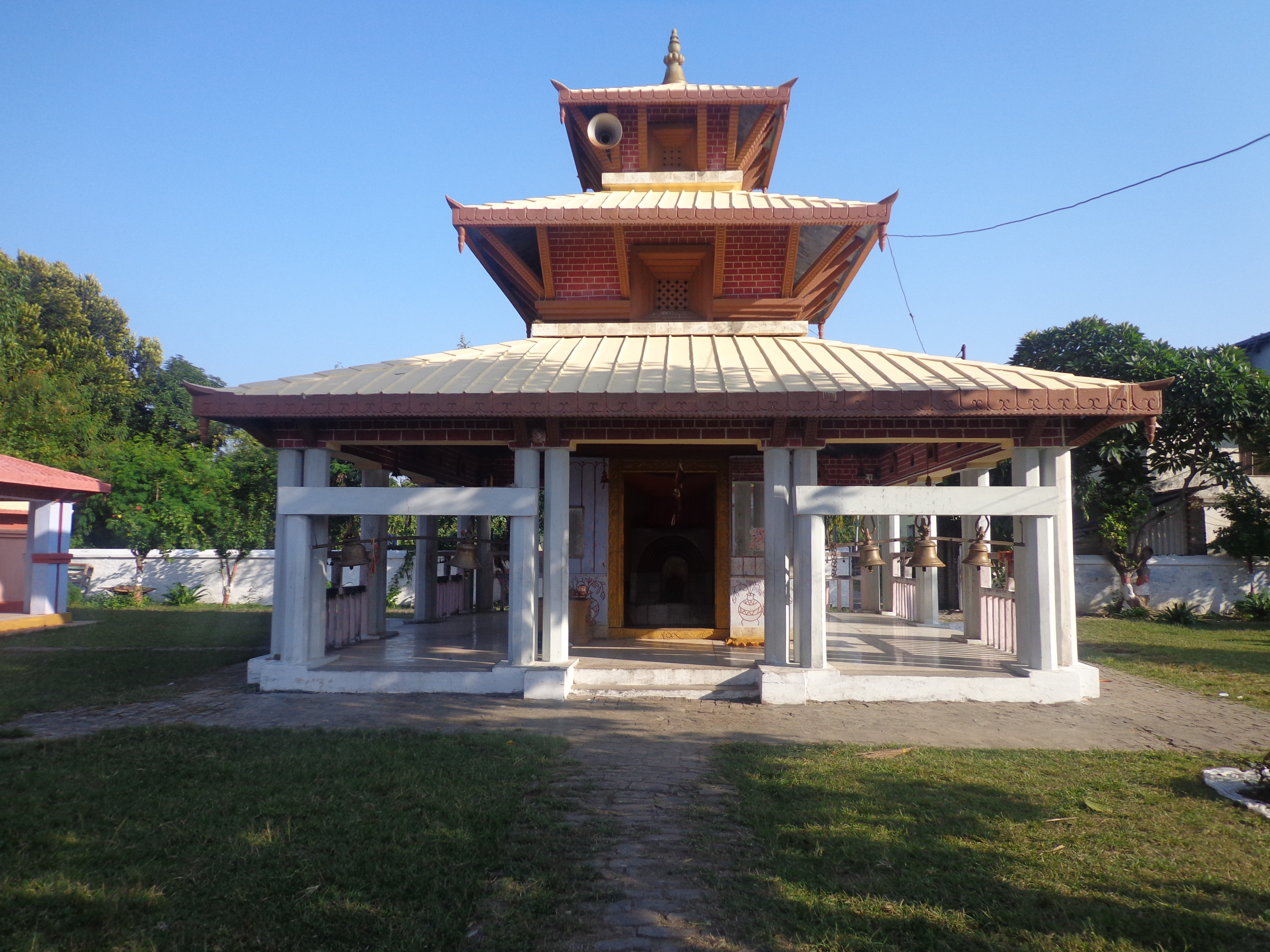

Religion
- Affiliation: Hinduism

Location
- Location: Gulariya
- Country: Nepal

Baglamukhi Temple (Nepali: बगलामुखी मन्दिर) is one of the most important Hindu temples in Nepal, located at the center of Gulariya city, Bardiya district in Lumbini province. It is dedicated to Baglamukhi- a Durga.

Baglamukhi temple is known to be one of the oldest in the region, and the oldest temple in Bardiya District. Every year, it attracts many devotees from around the country. Specially in the festival of Dasain, the biggest festival in the country, the temple receives a huge crowd of people.

The temple was established in 1937 AD (1994 BS).
