= List of monuments in Banke, Nepal =

This is a list of monuments in Banke District, Nepal as officially recognized by and available through the website of the Department of Archaeology, Nepal.

== List of monuments ==
ID	Name	Type	Location	District	Coordinates	Image
NP-BAN-01	Bageshwori Temple			Banke		Bageshwori Temple Upload Photo
NP-BAN-02	Ganesh Temple			Banke		Upload Photo Upload Photo
NP-BAN-03	Saraswati Temple			Banke		Upload Photo Upload Photo
NP-BAN-04	Bhuwnarbhawani Devi Temple		Baijapur	Banke		Upload Photo Upload Photo
NP-BAN-05	Idgah		BP chowk	Banke		Upload Photo Upload Photo

== See also ==
- List of monuments in Lumbini Province
- List of monuments in Nepal
