= Supa Deurali Temple =

Hindu temple in Nepal

- सुपा देउराली मन्दिर
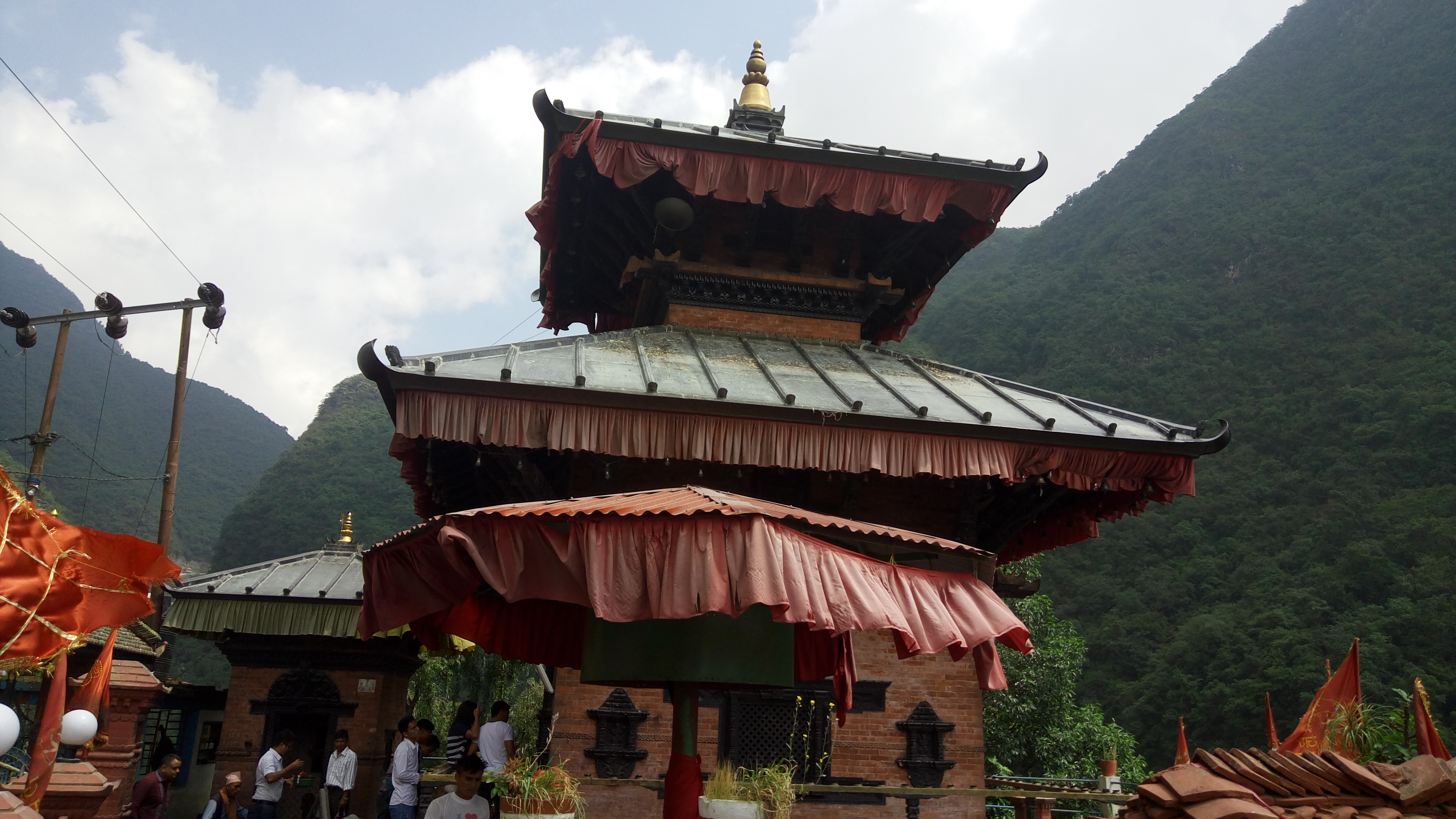
- Supa Deurali Temple

- Location in Nepal

Religion
- Affiliation: Hinduism
- District: Arghakhanchi District

Location
- Location: Sandhikharka
- Country: Nepal
- Interactive map of Supa Deurali Temple
- Coordinates: 27.9002247°N 83.1336951°E

Supa Deurali Temple is a Hindu temple located in Sandhikharka municipality, Arghakhanchi district of Nepal. It lies at an altitude of about 4,500 feet. Supadevi is considered to fulfill the wishes of devotees. In addition to Goddess Bhagavati, there are murtis of Ganesh, Mahakali, Mahalaxmi and Shiva in the temple. The donation received from the devotee is used to run two local schools.

== Mythology ==
According to mythology, during the Baise-Chaubise era, a marriage was decided between the prince of Khanchikot and the princess of Balrampur, India. On the wedding day, while returning to the bride, there was a plan to feed the people on the way. During the feast, there was a dispute among the people regarding the caste of bride.

Regardless of the controversy, the bride was taken towards Khanchikot. However, blood started leaking from the pallaquin carrying the bride. When the people looked inside, the bride had committed suicide. From the next day, villages started suffering from unknown disease. A Jhankri said that the dead princess has appeared in the form of Devi and should be worshipped. The villagers gathered in the place where the blood had appeared and started worshipping the place.

== History ==
Supa Deurali Temple in Arghakhanchi

The temple was constructed in 1600 B.S. by King of Khanchi, Biswa Pal Shah in the name of his daughter Subarna Kumari and installed the Bhagwati devi goddess. Daily prayer is offered to the goddess. Animal sacrifice is done except on the days of new moon, Shri panchami, Rishi Panchami, Krishna Janmashtami, Ekadashi, Akshaya Tritiya and Rama Navami.

Daily prayer was started from 2040 BS and a new structure in pagoda shape was constructed in 2042 BS. Over the years, the temple has undergone multiple renovations, with efforts made to preserve its architectural and cultural significance.

The temple holds great religious and historical importance among devotees, attracting pilgrims from various parts of Nepal, especially during Dashain and other Hindu festivals. Many visitors believe that worshiping at Supa Deurali brings protection and fulfills wishes. The surrounding area, rich in natural beauty, has also made the temple a popular tourist destination.

In recent years, local authorities and devotees have taken initiatives to improve infrastructure, including road access and facilities for pilgrims. Plans for further development and preservation are continuously being discussed to maintain the temple’s heritage while accommodating the increasing number of visitors.

[5]
