= List of monuments in Arghakhanchi, Nepal =

This is a list of monuments in Arghakhanchi District, Nepal as officially recognized by and available through the website of the Department of Archaeology, Nepal. Arghakhanchi is a district in Lumbini Province and is located in western Nepal.

== List of monuments ==
ID	Name	Type	Location	District	Coordinates	Image
NP-AK-01	Udayapurkot			Arghakhanchi		Upload Photo Upload Photo
NP-AK-02	Chhatra Maharaj Temple			Arghakhanchi		Upload Photo Upload Photo
NP-AK-03	Arghakot Darbar			Arghakhanchi		Upload Photo Upload Photo
NP-AK-04	Khanchikot			Arghakhanchi		Upload Photo Upload Photo
NP-AK-05	Bhimsen Temple			Arghakhanchi		Upload Photo Upload Photo
NP-AK-06	Aghraga Bhagawati			Arghakhanchi		Upload Photo Upload Photo
NP-AK-07	Dhurkot			Arghakhanchi		Upload Photo Upload Photo

== See also ==
- List of monuments in Lumbini Province
- List of monuments in Nepal
