= List of monuments in Dang, Nepal =

This is a list of monuments in Dang District, Nepal as officially recognized by and available through the website of the Department of Archaeology, Nepal. Dang is a district of Lumbini Province and is located in midwestern Nepal. Hindu temples are the main attraction of this district.

== List of monuments ==
| ID | Name | Type | Location | District | Coordinates | Image |
|---|---|---|---|---|---|---|
| NP-DG-01 | Ratannath Temple | | Ghorahi | Dang | | Upload Photo Upload Photo |
| NP-DG-02 | Pipri Shivalaya | | | Dang | | Upload Photo Upload Photo |
| NP-DG-03 | Gorakshyapatra SriShhiddhi Ratannath Math | | | Dang | | Upload Photo Upload Photo |
| NP-DG-04 | Baraha Temple | | | Dang | | Baraha Temple Upload Photo |
| NP-DG-05 | Manthuryadevi (Khuariamai) temple | | | Dang | | Upload Photo Upload Photo |
| NP-DG-06 | Gorakhnath temple | | | Dang | | Upload Photo Upload Photo |
| NP-DG-07 | Salyani Raja's Darbar | | | Dang | | Upload Photo Upload Photo |
| NP-DG-08 | Chhillikot's remains | | | Dang | | Upload Photo Upload Photo |
| NP-DG-09 | Pandaveshwor Mandir | | | Dang | | Upload Photo Upload Photo |

== See also ==
- List of monuments in Lumbini Province
- List of monuments in Nepal
