= List of monuments in Rupandehi, Nepal =

This is a list of monuments in Rupandehi District, Nepal as officially recognized by and available through the website of the Department of Archaeology, Nepal. Rupandehi is a district of Lumbini Province and is located in south-western Nepal.

== List of monuments ==
ID	Name	Type	Location	District	Coordinates	Image
NP-RP-01	Bhimsen Temple			Rupandehi		Upload Photo Upload Photo
NP-RP-02	Lumbini			Rupandehi	27°28′11″N 83°16′25″E	Lumbini Upload Photo
NP-RP-03	Mdarasa with 7 Doors			Rupandehi		Upload Photo Upload Photo
NP-RP-04	Narayan Mandir			Rupandehi		Upload Photo Upload Photo
NP-RP-05	Monuments in Bhavani Temple premise			Rupandehi		Upload Photo Upload Photo
NP-RP-06	Kanyamai			Rupandehi		Upload Photo Upload Photo
NP-RP-07	Bairimai			Rupandehi		Upload Photo Upload Photo
NP-RP-08	Ancient ruins of Paisia			Rupandehi		Upload Photo Upload Photo
NP-RP-09	Bnjarhi archaeological site			Rupandehi		Upload Photo Upload Photo
NP-RP-10	Jitgadhi			Rupandehi		Upload Photo Upload Photo
NP-RP-11	Phulbaari Palace			Rupandehi	27°42′23″N 83°27′14″E	Phulbaari Palace Upload Photo

== See also ==
- List of monuments in Lumbini Province
- List of monuments in Nepal
