= List of monuments in Rolpa, Nepal =

This is a list of monuments in Rolpa District, Nepal as officially recognized by and available through the website of the Department of Archaeology, Nepal. Rolpa is a district of Lumbini Province and is located in midwestern Nepal. Hindu temples are the main attraction of this district.

== List of monuments ==
ID	Name	Type	Location	District	Coordinates	Image
NP-RO-01	Musikot			Rolpa		Upload Photo Upload Photo
NP-RO-02	Phalewang kot and Darbar			Rolpa		Upload Photo Upload Photo
NP-RO-03	Rudreshwar Mahadev			Rolpa		Upload Photo Upload Photo
NP-RO-04	Putali Drwar (Phalewang's new Darbar)			Rolpa		Upload Photo Upload Photo
NP-RO-05	Phalewang Shivalaya			Rolpa		Upload Photo Upload Photo

== See also ==
- List of monuments in Lumbini Province
- List of monuments in Nepal
