= List of monuments in Gulmi, Nepal =

This is a list of monuments in Gulmi District, a district of Lumbini Province in western Nepal, as officially recognized by and available on the website of the Department of Archaeology, Nepal.

== List of monuments ==
ID	Name	Type	Location	District	Coordinates	Image
NP-GL-01	Parasurameshwar Shivalaya			Gulmi		Upload Photo Upload Photo
NP-GL-02	Musikot			Gulmi		Upload Photo Upload Photo
NP-GL-03	Charpala Darbar			Gulmi		Upload Photo Upload Photo
NP-GL-04	Bami Pokhari			Gulmi		Upload Photo Upload Photo
NP-GL-05	Kafalkot's Pokhari			Gulmi		Upload Photo Upload Photo
NP-GL-06	Shiva Temple			Gulmi		Upload Photo Upload Photo
NP-GL-07	Radha Krishna Temple			Gulmi		Upload Photo Upload Photo
NP-GL-08	Kotaghar			Gulmi		Upload Photo Upload Photo
NP-GL-09	Narmadeshwar Temple			Gulmi		Upload Photo Upload Photo
NP-GL-10	Laxminarayan Temple			Gulmi		Upload Photo Upload Photo
NP-GL-11	Manimukundeshwar Mahadev			Gulmi		Upload Photo Upload Photo
NP-GL-12	Yagyamukteshwar Temple			Gulmi		Upload Photo Upload Photo
NP-GL-13	Shring Rishi Ashram			Gulmi		Upload Photo Upload Photo
NP-GL-14	Resunga Yagyashala			Gulmi		Resunga Yagyashala Upload Photo
NP-GL-15	Laxminarayan Mausoleum			Gulmi		Upload Photo Upload Photo
NP-GL-16	Ismakot			Gulmi		Upload Photo Upload Photo

== See also ==
- List of monuments in Lumbini Province
- List of monuments in Nepal
