= List of monuments in Rukum, Nepal =

This is a list of monuments in the former Rukum District, Nepal as officially recognized by and available through the website of the Department of Archaeology, Nepal.

Rukum was a district in midwestern Nepal. It was divided in 2015 into Eastern Rukum District (in Lumbini Province) and Western Rukum District (in Karnali Province).

== List of monuments ==
ID	Name	Type	Location	District	Coordinates	Image
NP-RK-01	Dhuwakot Darbar			Rukum		Upload Photo Upload Photo
NP-RK-02	Shivamandir (Devalsthan)			Rukum		Upload Photo Upload Photo
NP-RK-03	Kalika Temple			Rukum		Upload Photo Upload Photo
NP-RK-04	Sher Mukteshwar temple of Lord Shiva			Rukum		Upload Photo Upload Photo
NP-RK-05	Barah Temple			Rukum		Upload Photo Upload Photo
NP-RK-06	Digre Saikumari temple			Rukum		Upload Photo Upload Photo
NP-RK-07	Kalika Bhagawati temple			Rukum		Upload Photo Upload Photo

== See also ==
- List of monuments in Karnali Province
- List of monuments in Lumbini Province
- List of monuments in Nepal
