= List of monuments in Pyuthan, Nepal =

This is a list of monuments in Pyuthan District, Nepal as officially recognized by and available through the website of the Department of Archaeology, Nepal. Pyuthan is a district of Lumbini Province and is located in midwestern Nepal. Hindu temples are the main attraction of this district.

== List of monuments ==
ID	Name	Type	Location	District	Coordinates	Image
NP-PY-01	Tharuraja Dangisharan's Darbar ruins			Pyuthan		Upload Photo Upload Photo
NP-PY-02	Shree Gorakhnath temple			Pyuthan		Upload Photo Upload Photo
NP-PY-03	Bhitrikot Darbar's ruins			Pyuthan		Upload Photo Upload Photo
NP-PY-04	Bhimsen Temple			Pyuthan		Upload Photo Upload Photo
NP-PY-05	Chhetrapal Temple			Pyuthan		Upload Photo Upload Photo
NP-PY-06	Narayan Mandir			Pyuthan		Upload Photo Upload Photo
NP-PY-07	Ganesh Temple			Pyuthan		Upload Photo Upload Photo
NP-PY-08	Bhimsen Temple			Pyuthan		Upload Photo Upload Photo
NP-PY-09	Shiva temple (Rameshwar Mahadev)			Pyuthan		Upload Photo Upload Photo
NP-PY-10	Tushar Kot			Pyuthan		Upload Photo Upload Photo

== See also ==
- List of monuments in Lumbini Province
- List of monuments in Nepal
