= List of monuments in Nawalparasi, Nepal =

This is a list of monuments in the former Nawalparasi District, Nepal as officially recognized by and available through the website of the Department of Archaeology, Nepal.

Nawalparasi was a district in western Nepal. It was divided in 2015 into Nawalpur District (in Gandaki Province) and Parasi District (in Lumbini Province).

== List of monuments ==
ID	Name	Type	Location	District	Coordinates	Image
NP-NLP-01	Bikuliko archaeological Dhisko			Nawalparasi		Upload Photo Upload Photo
NP-NLP-02	Ramgram Stupa			Parasi		Ramgram Stupa Upload Photo
NP-NLP-03	Shivapurgadhi			Nawalparasi		Upload Photo Upload Photo
NP-NLP-04	Ancient Temple's ruins			Nawalparasi		Upload Photo Upload Photo
NP-NLP-05	Ancient Well			Nawalparasi		Upload Photo Upload Photo
NP-NLP-06	Mukundapur Gadhi			Nawalparasi		Upload Photo Upload Photo
NP-NLP-07	Panditpur Archeological site			Nawalparasi		Upload Photo Upload Photo
NP-NLP-08	Bardgoria's ancient ruins			Nawalparasi		Upload Photo Upload Photo

== See also ==
- List of monuments in Gandaki Province
- List of monuments in Lumbini Province
- List of monuments in Nepal
