= List of monuments in Kapilvastu, Nepal =

This is a list of monuments in Kapilvastu District, Nepal as officially recognized by and available through the website of the Department of Archaeology, Nepal. Kapilvastu is a district of Lumbini Province and is located in south-western Nepal.

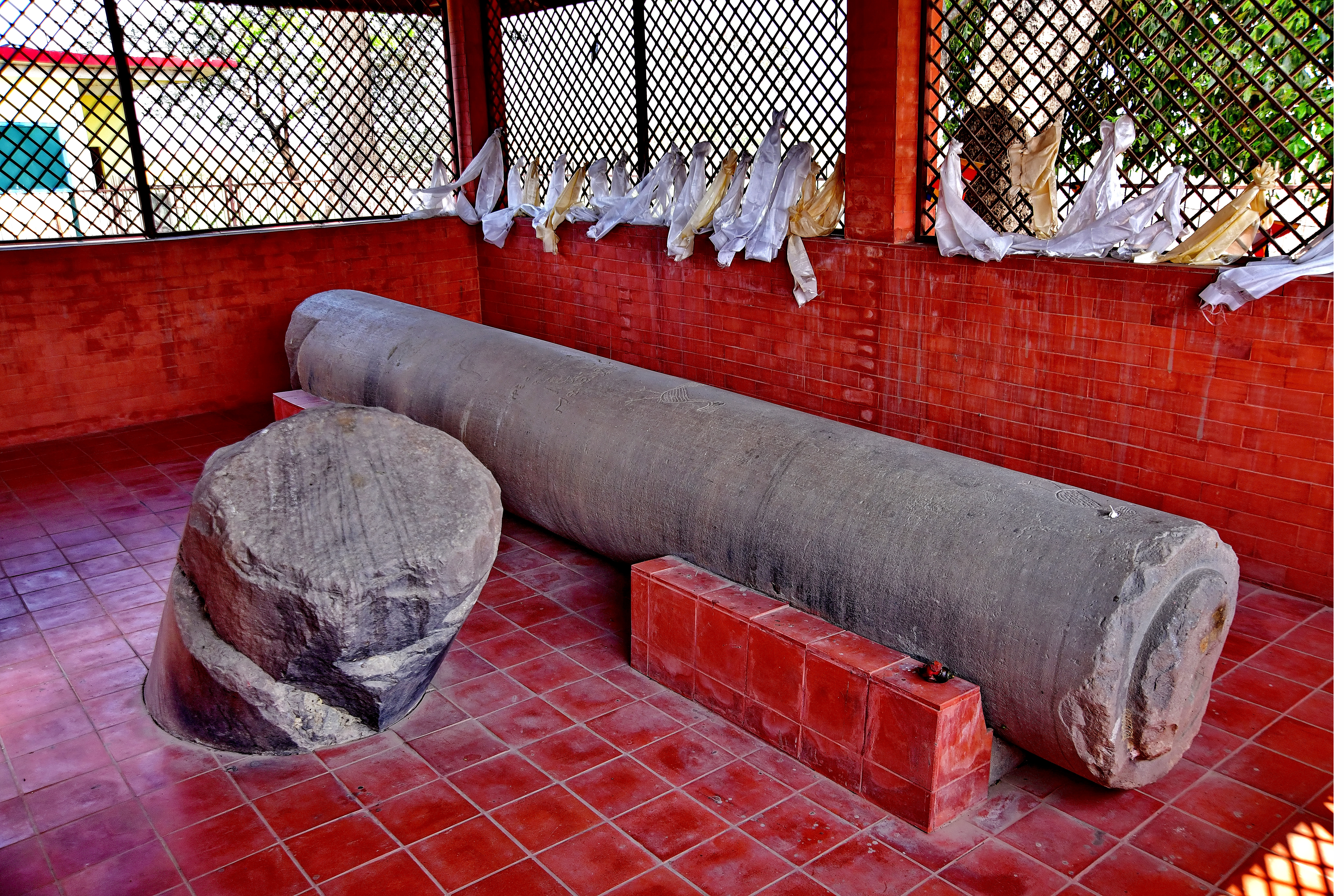
Asoka Pillar of Niglihawa

== List of monuments ==
ID	Name	Type	Location	District	Coordinates	Image
NP-KP-01	Dhurkot Darbar			Kapilvastu		Upload Photo Upload Photo
NP-KP-02	Mayadevi Temple Premises			Kapilvastu		Mayadevi Temple Premises Upload Photo
NP-KP-03	Kudan			Kapilvastu		Upload Photo Upload Photo
NP-KP-04	Stone Column of Gotihawa		Gotihawa	Kapilvastu		Stone Column of Gotihawa Upload Photo
NP-KP-05	Ashoka Pillar of Niglihawa		Nigalihawa	Kapilvastu		Ashoka Pillar of Niglihawa Upload Photo
NP-KP-06	Dhamanihwa's Stupas			Kapilvastu		Upload Photo Upload Photo
NP-KP-07	Mainihawa Shivalaya and Archeological Dhisko			Kapilvastu		Upload Photo Upload Photo
NP-KP-08	Semarhawa Shivalaya			Kapilvastu		Upload Photo Upload Photo
NP-KP-09	Tauleshhwar Shivalaya			Kapilvastu		Upload Photo Upload Photo
NP-KP-10	Lohasaria Stupa's Ruins			Kapilvastu		Upload Photo Upload Photo
NP-KP-11	Araurakot's Ruins			Kapilvastu		Araurakot's Ruins Upload Photo
NP-KP-12	Sagarhawa Archaeological Site			Kapilvastu		Upload Photo Upload Photo
NP-KP-13	Pipri Archaeological Site			Kapilvastu		Upload Photo Upload Photo
NP-KP-14	Dharampania Sarkup			Kapilvastu		Upload Photo Upload Photo
NP-KP-15	Hardewaka Ancient Ruins			Kapilvastu		Upload Photo Upload Photo
NP-KP-16	Dohani Archaeological Site			Kapilvastu		Upload Photo Upload Photo
NP-KP-17	Shishahania Archaeological Site			Kapilvastu		Upload Photo Upload Photo
NP-KP-18	Shailhwaka Ancient Ruins			Kapilvastu		Upload Photo Upload Photo
NP-KP-19	Badarhawa's Ruins			Kapilvastu		Upload Photo Upload Photo
NP-KP-20	Lamtia Kot			Kapilvastu		Upload Photo Upload Photo

== See also ==
- List of monuments in Lumbini Province
- List of monuments in Nepal
