= List of monuments in Gandaki Zone =

Gandaki Zone was one of the fourteen zones of Nepal, comprising six districts, namely, Gorkha, Kaski, Lamjung, Manang, Syangja and Tanahu. Here is district wise List of Monuments which is in the Gandaki Zone.

== Gandaki Zone ==
- List of monuments in Gorkha District
- List of monuments in Kaski District
- List of monuments in Lamjung District
- List of monuments in Manang District
- List of monuments in Syangja District
- List of monuments in Tanahu District
