= Besishahar =

Besishahar वेसीशहर
- Municipality
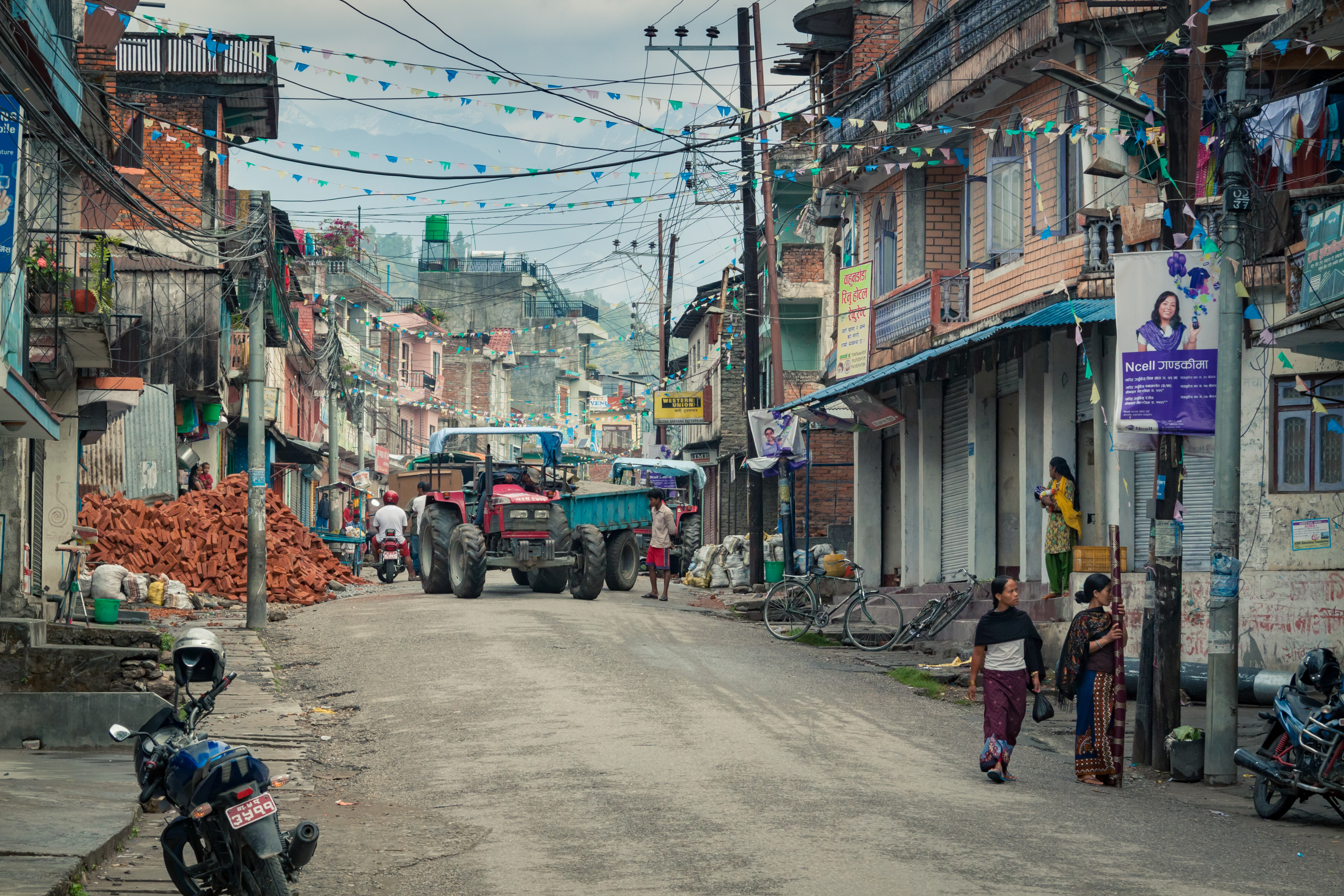
- Main street of Besishahar Municipality in the morning.

- Location in Nepal Besishahar (Nepal)
- Coordinates: 28°13′52″N 84°22′39″E
- Country: Nepal
- Province: Gandaki Province
- District: Lamjung District
- Established: 15 May 2014

Government
  - Type: Mayor–council government
  - Mayor: Guman Singh Aryal (NCP)
  - Deputy Mayor: Padma Gurung (NCP)

Area
  - Total: 127.64 km^{2} (49.28 sq mi)
- Elevation: 760 m (2,490 ft)

Population (2024)
  - Total: 44,598
  - Density: 349.40/km^{2} (904.95/sq mi)
- Time zone: UTC+5:45 (NST)
- Postal Code: 40605
- Area code: 066
- Climate: Cwa
- Website: besishaharmun.gov.np

Besishahar (Nepali: बेसीशहर नगरपालिका) is a municipality and the district headquarters of Lamjung District in Gandaki Province, Nepal. The District Post Office(DPO), Lamjung, is assigned postal code of 40605.

The Besishahar Municipality was formed by merging the existing Village Development Committees i.e. Besishahar, Gaunshahar, Udipur, Puranakot, Nalma, Chandisthan, Baglungpani (wards no. 3, 4, 7, 8 & 9), Bajhakhet, Hiletaksar (wards no. 9) and Chiti and have 11 wards. This municipality has a sub-tropical climate with deciduous forests. Annapurna II, Machhapuchhre, Lamjung Himal can be viewed from north of Besishahar Municipality.

== Population ==
At the time of the 2024 Annual Municipal Development Plan 2081/82 it had a population of 44,598 including Besishahar, Gaunshahar, Udipur, Chiti, Baglungpani, Bajhakhet and Chandisthan. The population of the municipality declined to 38,232 at the 2021 Nepal census. 99.5% of the residents were Nepali citizens and 81.2% were literate in 2021.

== Transportation and communications ==
The Dumre–Besishahar–Manang Highway connects the city to various parts of Nepal. (Parts of the highway are only driveable by jeep.) The proximity of this city from Kathmandu (178.8 km), Pokhara (108.9 km), Bharatpur (104 km), Birganj (234 km), Damauli (59 km) and Prithbinarayan(Gorkha) (76 km). Bus, Micro Bus, Taxi, Jeep, and other land transportation are available for travel, both inside and outside of the city.

- Communication – One Television Channel "Lamjung Television" Conducted By Lamjung Media Network Pvt Ltd and three major local FM radio stations broadcast from Besishahar Municipality. They are "Radio Marsyangdi" – 95.0 MHz, "Radio Lamjung" – 88.4 MHz and "Radio Chautari" – 91.4 MHz, which are Community Radio stations. Land line telephone services and mobile telephone services are available to the majority of areas. There are multiple private Internet service providers available within the Municipality. Besishahar Municipality has print medias Lamjung Highlights, Antarang, Lamjung Aawaz etc.
- Banks – There are more than 25 banks and financial institution in Besishahar Municipality.

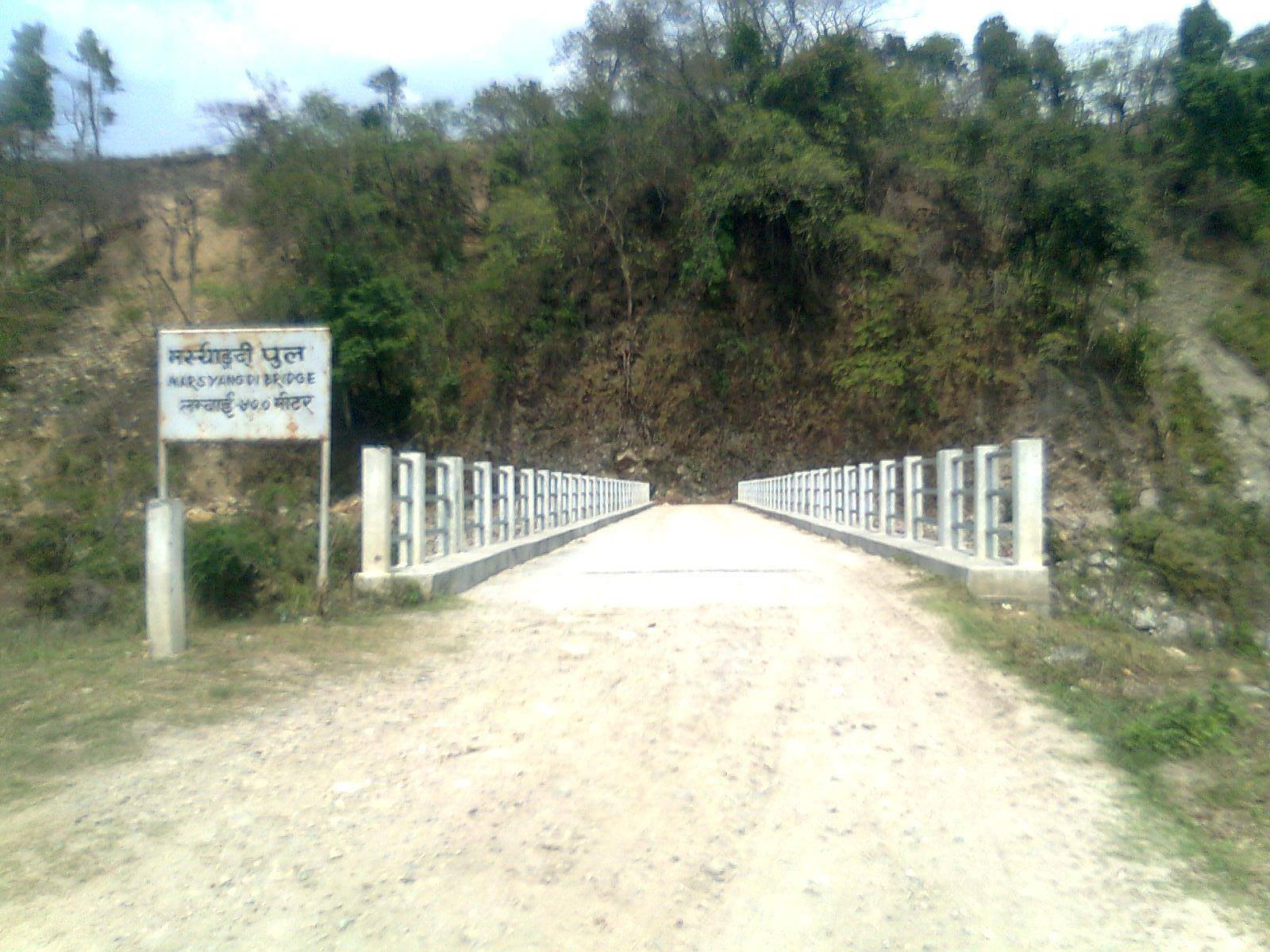
Marshyandi Bridge at Besishahar Municipality - 2 - Udipur

== Attractions ==
- Annapurna Circuit – It is the starting point of the Annapurna Circuit tourist route.
- Marshyangdi River – The Marshyangdi River flows north to south in the east of Besishahar Municipality. It is one of the branches of Gandaki River. The Marshyandi Bridge over the river connects eastern Lamjung. It is located in Besishahar Municipality – 2 – Udipur, Lamjung.
- The First Royal Palace Of Lamjung – It is also called Lamjung Durbar. It is the birthplace of the royal family of Lamjung in 1663 AD. Kalu Shah was the first king. It is also the place where King Yesho Bramha Shah, the founder of the Shah dynasty in Nepal, ruled the small principality of Lamjung. This palace was the capital of Lamjung. This palace stands in Gaunshahar.
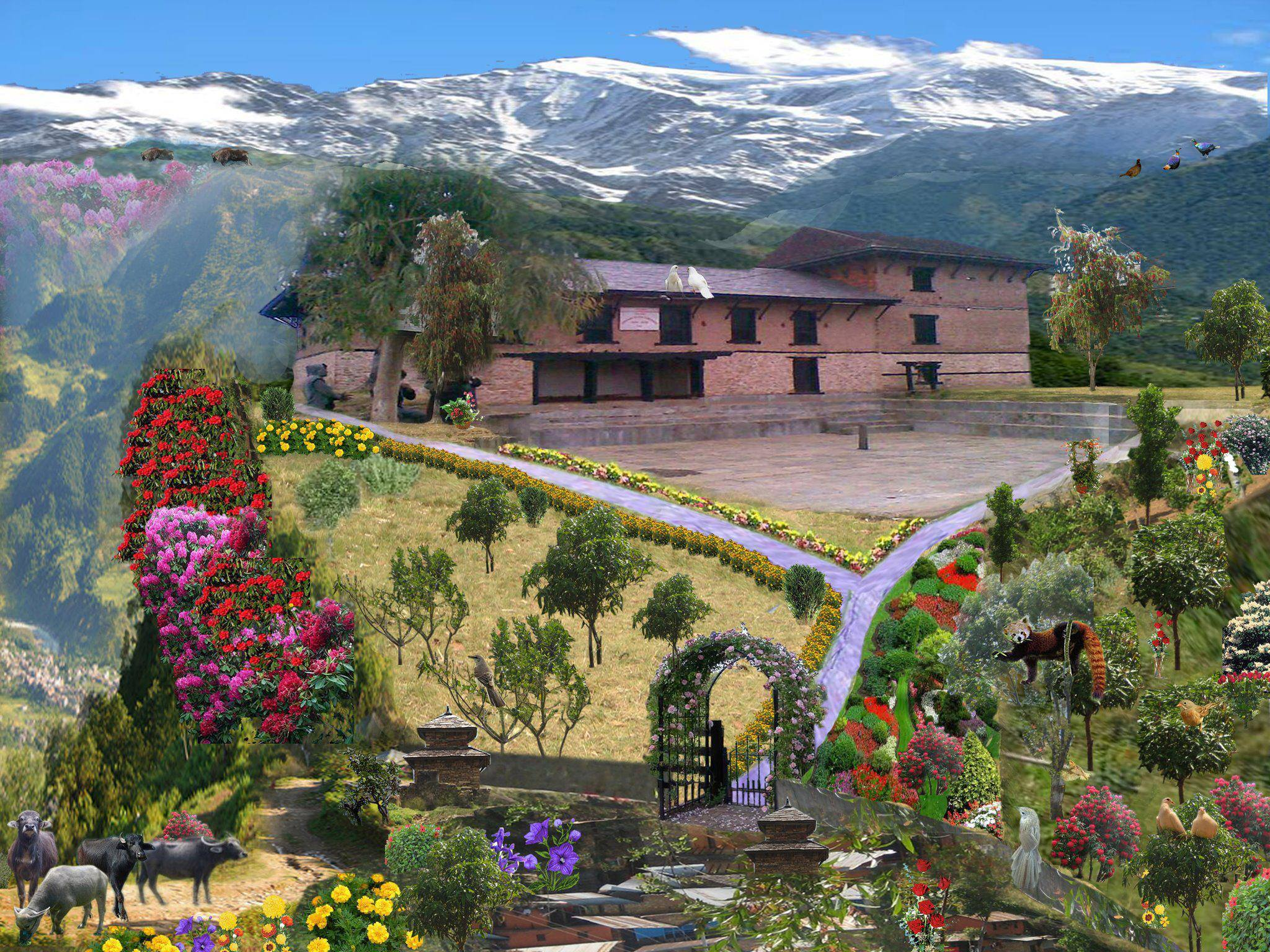
Painting of Lamjung Durbar at Gaunshahar
- Gaikhure Jharana – It is located in Besishahar Municipality – 2 – Udipur.
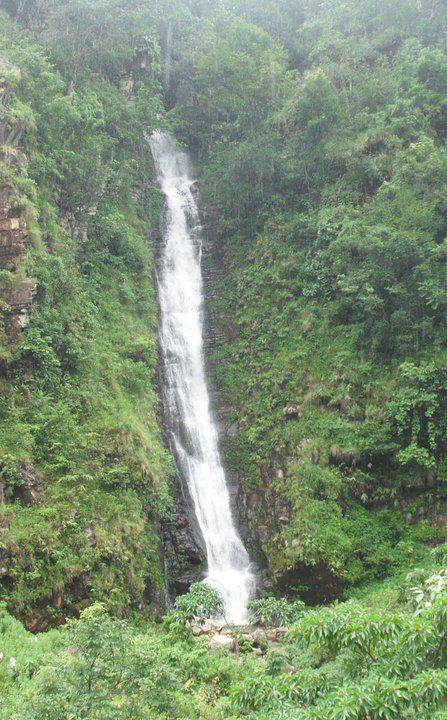
Gaikhure Jharana at Gaikhure, Udipur
- Purankot Fort – Used to protect the kingdom of Lamjung. Located near the ruins of Third Royal Palace of Lamjung (the summer home for the royalty).
- Royal Bath – "Tindhara" meaning three taps, is the mineral spring where the royalty bathed.
- Hadkhode Dada – The "Bone Hill", was considered a very dangerous place many cattle have died there. Still a place frequented by many eagles.
- Sutkeri Dunga – The strongest woman in Gaunshahar was said to have placed this very large stone here while pregnant.
- Dare Gauda – A cliff that the Gorkha's army scaled, using long ladders to attack Gaunshahar, burning many houses in the village.
- Middle Marshyandi Hydro Electricity – 70-Megawatt Mid-Marshyangdi Hydroelectricity Project (MMHEP), the second largest hydropower project in the country has started operation from 14 December 2008. PM Pushpa Kamal Dahal (Prachanda) had inaugurated the project. The project was started in June 2001 with joint investments of the Government of Nepal, Germany and Nepal Electricity Authority. It is located in Besishahar Municipality – 2 – Phaliyasanghu, Udipur.
- Karpureshwar Mandir – A religious place for the Hindus. It is the place where people go to worship lord Mahadeva.
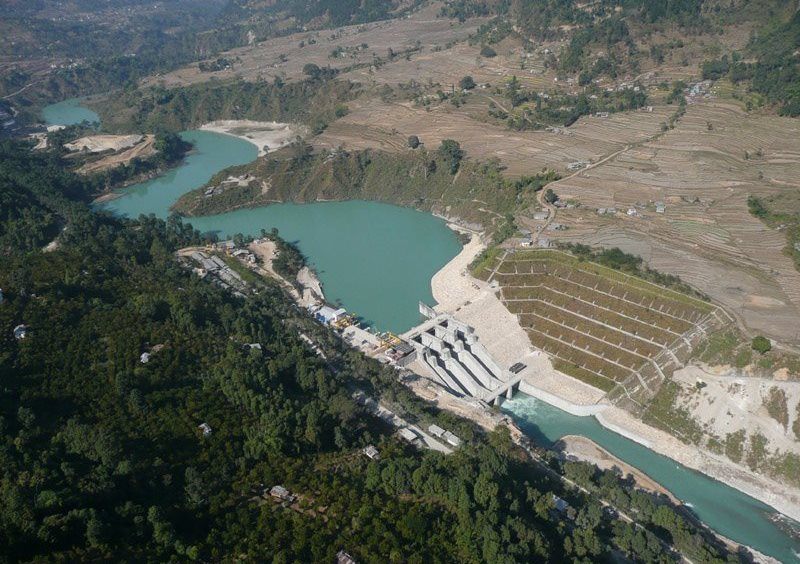
Middle Marshyandi Hydro Electricity Dam at Phaliyasanghu, Udipur

== Religious and cultural landmarks ==
- Lamjung Kalika Temple – It is a historical Hindu goddess temple of Lamjung District located in Gaunshahar. The big sister of the Gorkha Kalika. Open four times a year during festivals (Badha Dashain, Chaitre Dashin, Shree Panchami and Nuwai).
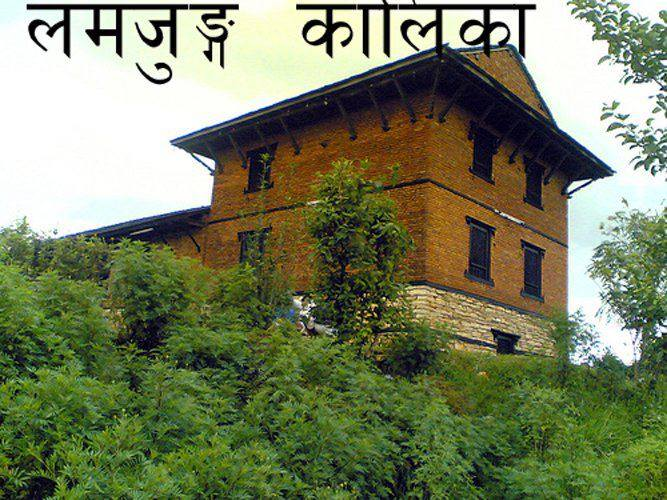
Lamjung Kalika at Gaunshahar
- Tilanagi Shivlaya Temple – Holy place to celebrate Shivaratri. Its the centre to perform Eastern Civilization Rituals of Puranakot and Duradanda Area. Located at the bank of Kirenche and Tilanagi rivers.* Udipur Kalika Temple – It is a Hindu goddess temple of Lamjung District located in Besishahar Municipality – 1 – Udipur, Lamjung. Udipur Kalika is a picnic spot in Lamjung.
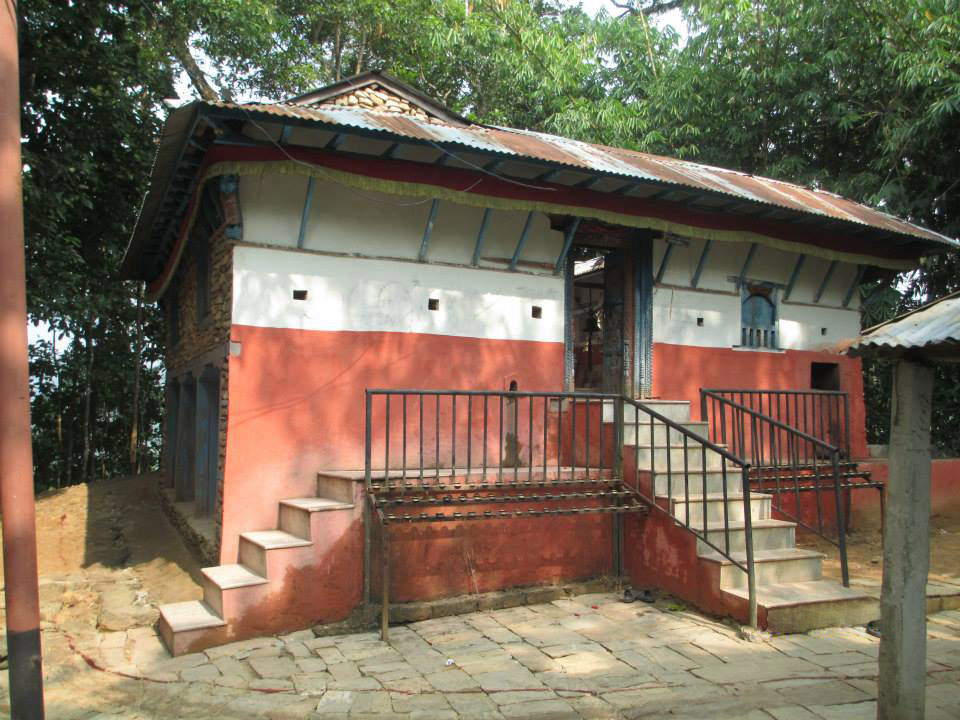
Udipur Kalika Temple at Udipur
- Chandimai Temple – On the seventh day of Bada Dashain, two priest from Gaunshahar travel to Besisahar to steal fruits and flowers and carry back up to this temple. While a parade of villagers and priests carrying a statue of Phulpati go down from the Royal Palace to meet the "thief priests".
- Bhimsen Temple – It is located in Besishahar Municipality – 10 – Besishahar Lamjung
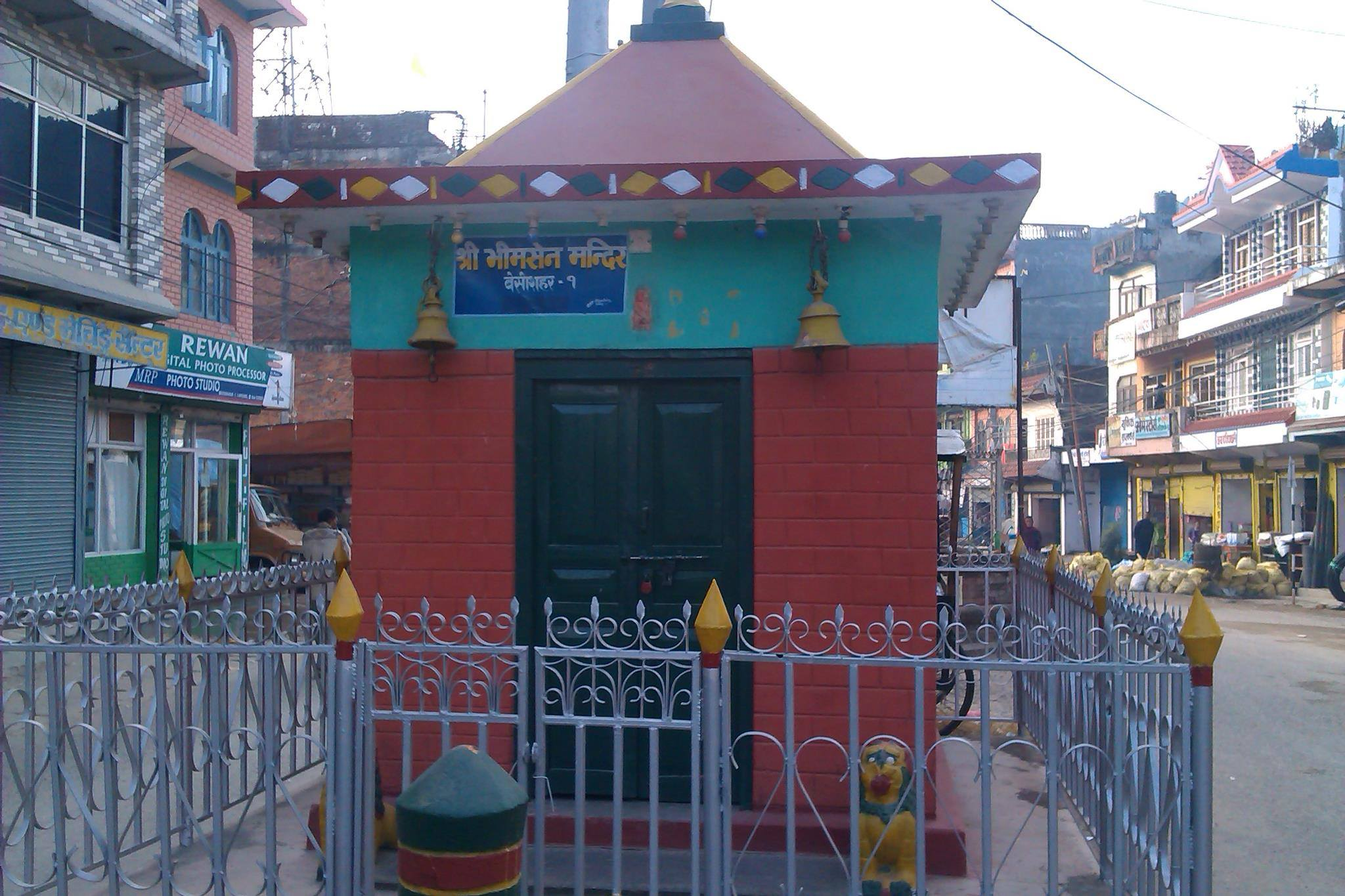
Bhimsen Temple at Besishahar

== Educational and institutions ==
- Marsyangdi Multiple Campus – Marshyangdi Multiple Campus (MMC), established in 1990 (2047 B.S.)
- Lamjung Skill Development Foundation (LSDF) Campus – A vast number of adolescents and youth of Nepal are out of the school system as they have been left-out or pushed-out of the school for various reasons and often found to be at the center of the vicious cycle as being either the cause or effect of the decade long armed-conflict. As a strategy to work in economic peace building a group of committed professionals with the support from Swiss-Nepal Society (SNS) and DIGA foundation of Switzerland, has established the Lamjung Skill Development Foundation (LSDF) Campus at Besishahar Municipality-4 Gairi, Lamjung. LSDF in its effort to provide a new life to marginalized youth is committed to provide market based practical oriented high-quality vocational/technical skills to the out-of-school youth so that they can be employed or self-employed after completion of their training. The Campus also aims at being a vehicle for rural reconstruction in the region. The campus opened its doors in summer 2008 with the two first long-term courses in civil construction and carpentry. Additional trades (electronic and mechanical) will be implemented step by step. Additional to the regular long-term courses, the campus regularly hosts short-term trainings according to the local needs. Among others, SNS-supported trainings for goat rearing, off-season vegetable and citrus fruits were carried out in close co-operation with local partners.
- Universal Academy
- Lamjung Higher Secondary School
- Marsyangdi Higher Secondary School
- Jana Vikas Higher Secondary School
- Ex-Army Boarding Higher Secondary School
- Vidhya Bikas Higher Secondary School
- Earthly Paradise Higher Secondary School
- Shree Jana Kalyan Secondary School
- Land Star English School
- New Vision Montessori School
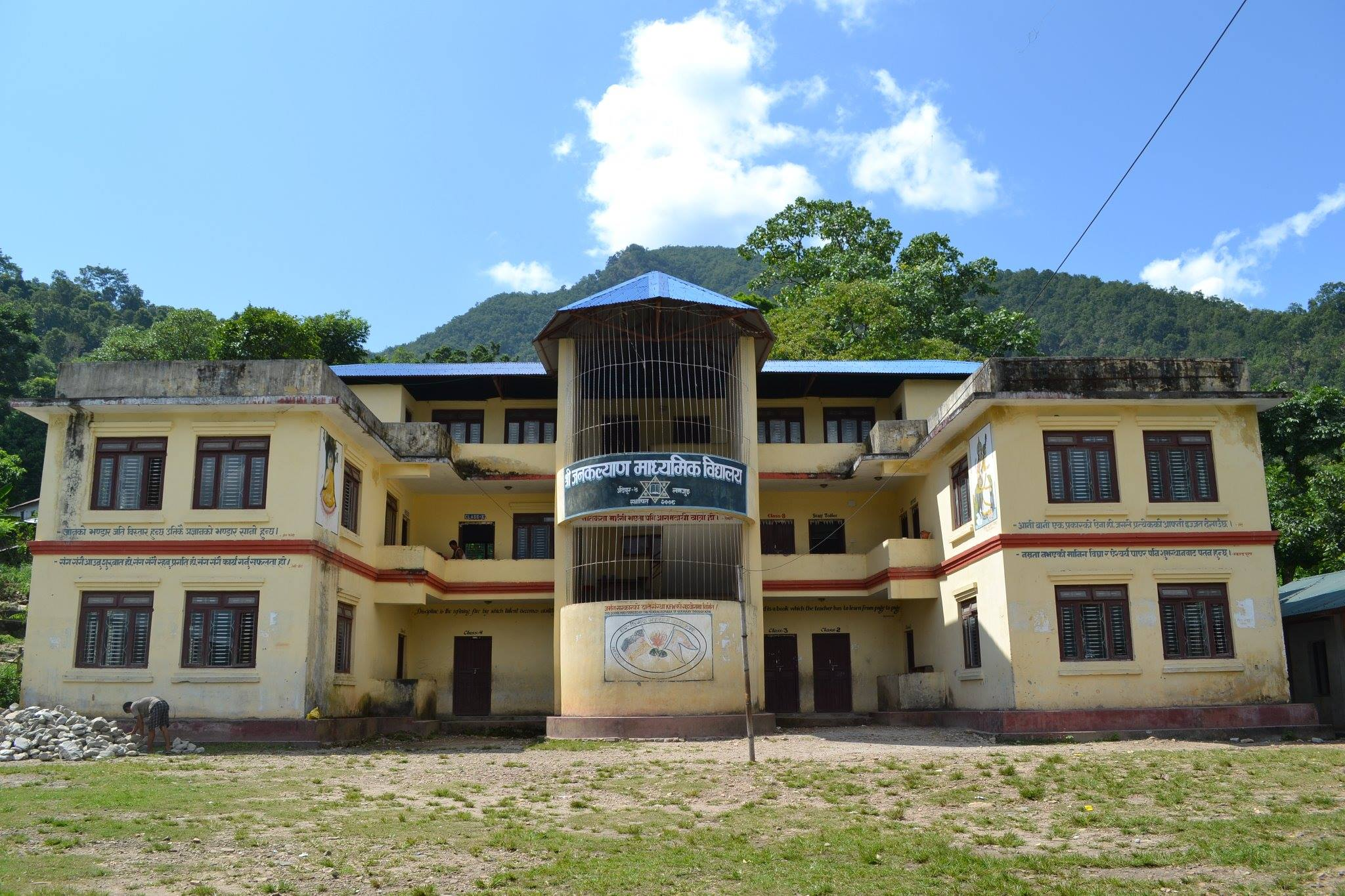
Shree Jana Kalyan Secondary School Udipur

== Hospitals ==
- Lamjung District Community Hospital (LDCH) – Since 2001 LDCH has been running under the management of Human Development Community Services (HDCS) with the support of the Government of Nepal. From a 15-bed hospital, LDCH now has 60 beds as well as a range of services, a study from the World Bank quoted Lamjung Hospital as being a "model hospital in Nepal."
- Besishahar Hospital & Research Center – It is located in Besishahar Bazar.
- Besishahar Dental hospital – It is located in Besishahar Bazar.
- Lamjung Polyclinic – It is located in Besishahar Bazar.
- Lamjung Eye Clinic – It is located in Besishahar Bazar.
- Lamjung Model Hospital – It is located in Besishahar Bazar.

== 2015 earthquake ==
The town shook during earthquake on 25 April 2015. Houses made of mud collapsed, while those made of concrete survived. There were no visible cracks on buildings. There was little damage. The town largely escaped the devastation suffered in other places in Nepal.

== Gallery ==
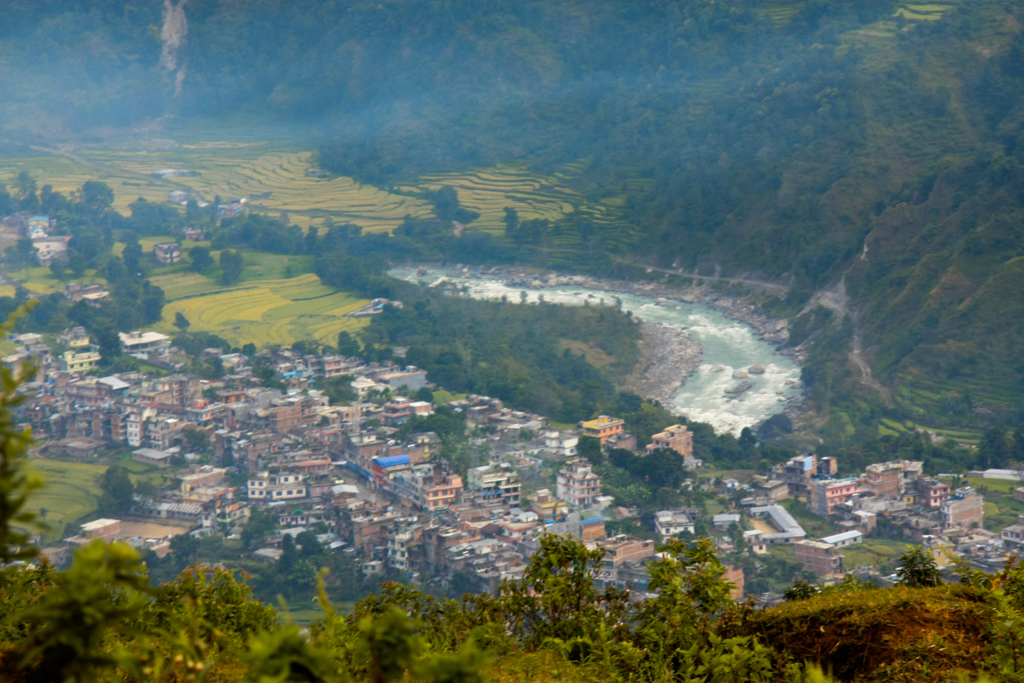
View of Besishahar from Gaunshahar.

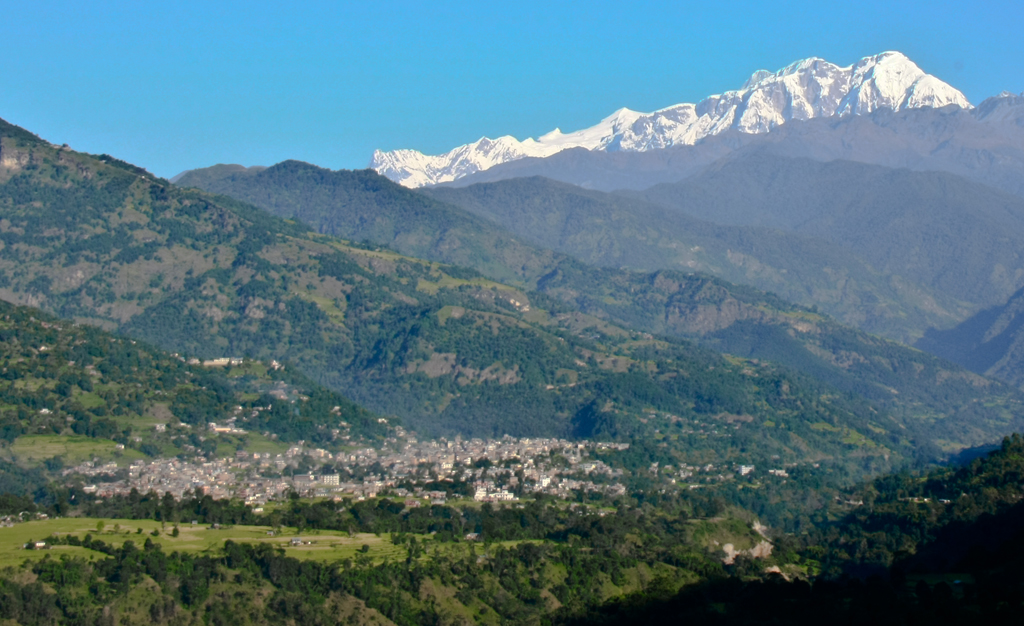
View of Besishahar from Hiletaksar.

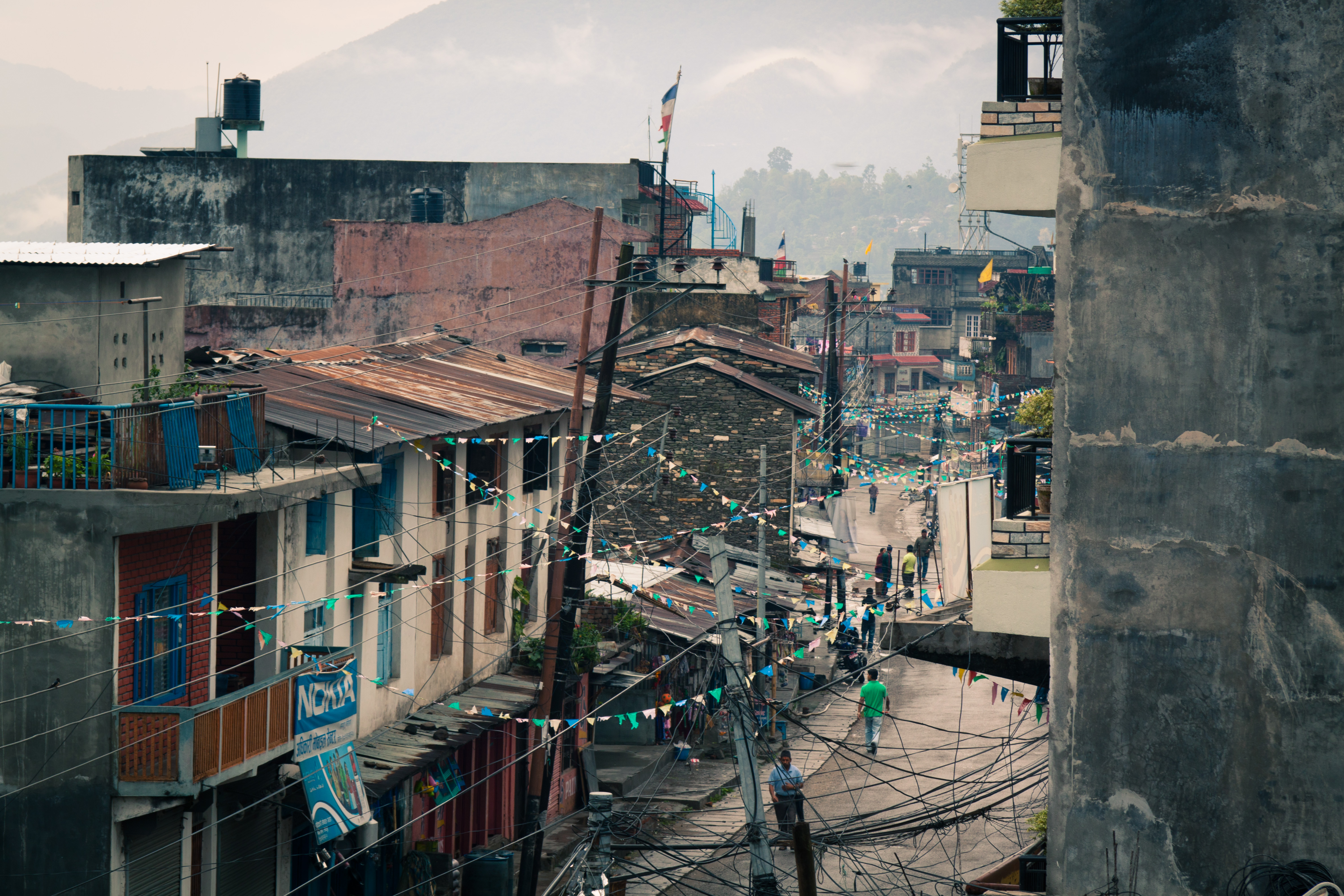
View of Besishahar

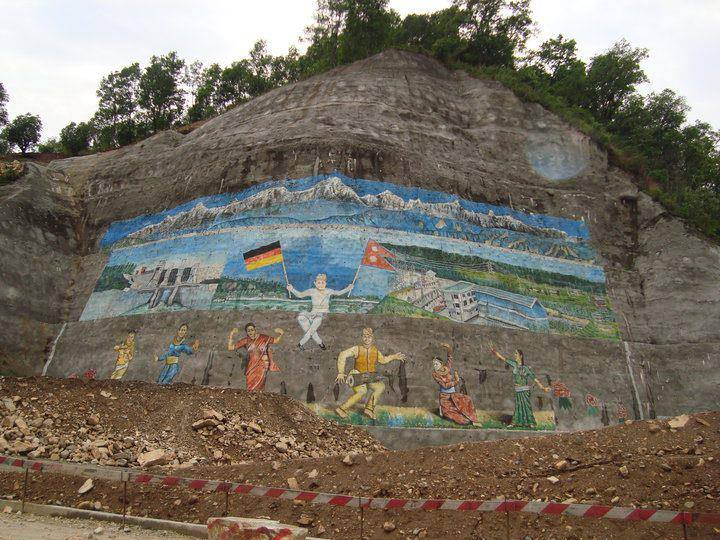
View of Aakase Vhir

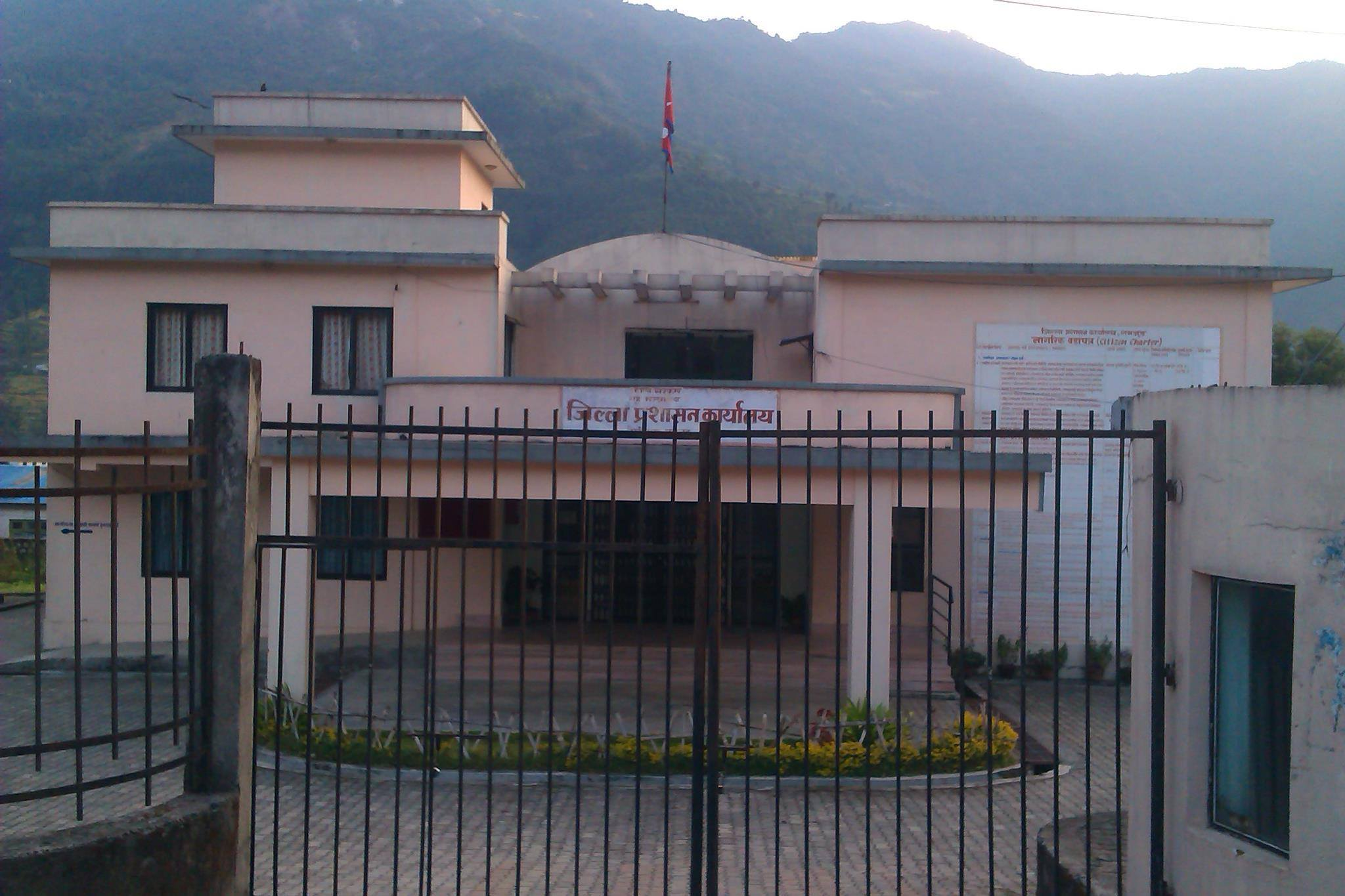
C.D.O Office

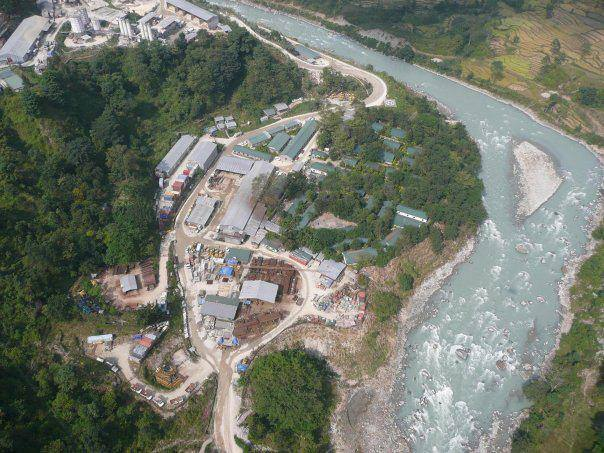
MMHE view from Udipur

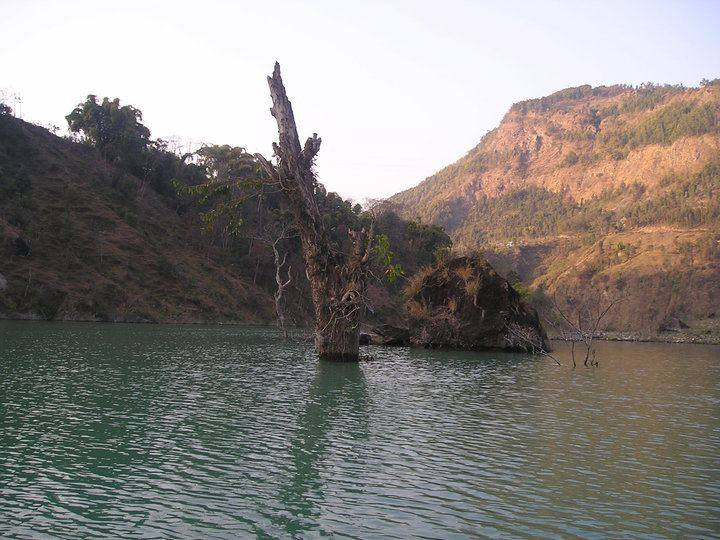
MMHE Dam

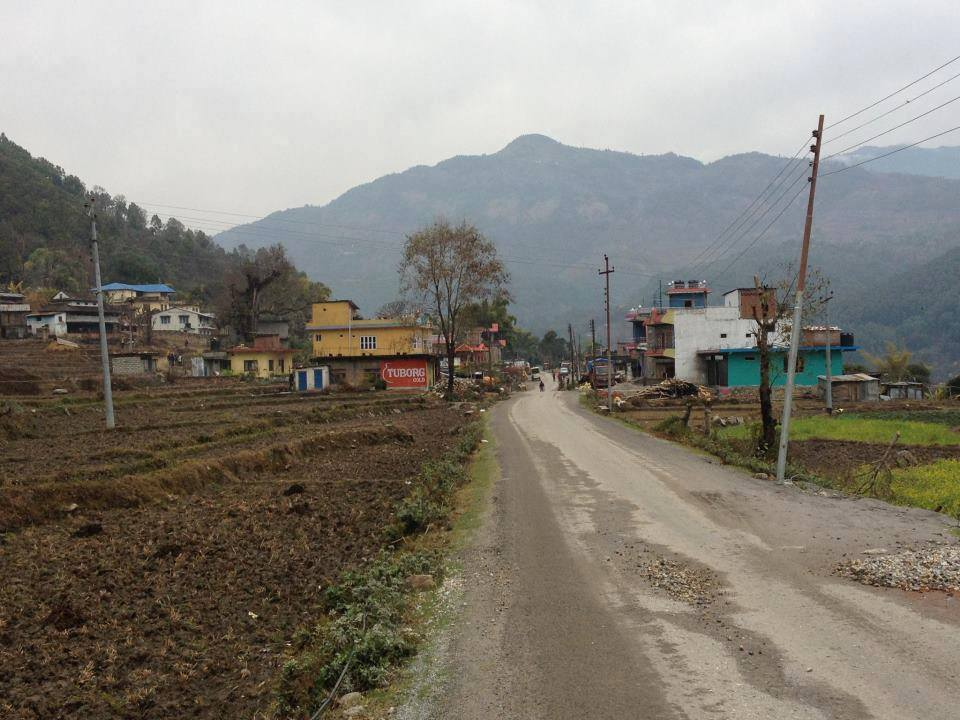
Udipur

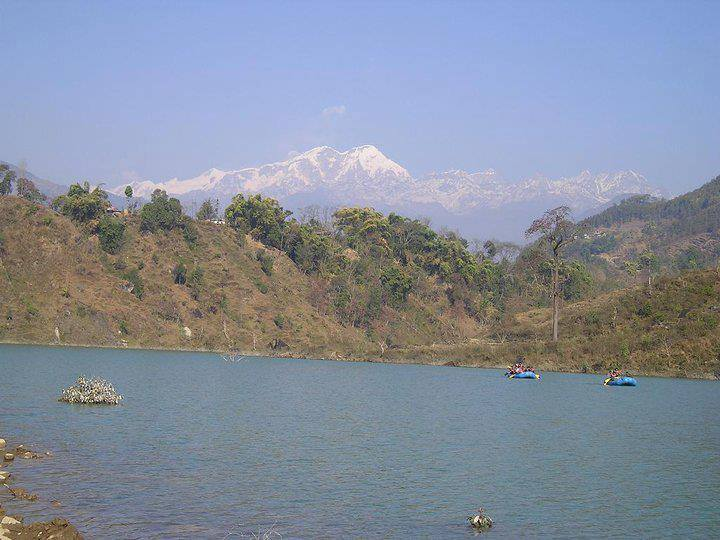
Boating in MMHE Dam

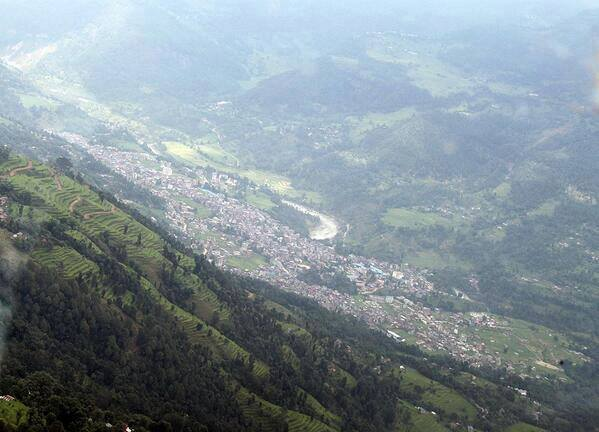
View of Besishahar from Helicopter

== See also ==
- Gaunshahar
- Udipur
- Chandisthan
- Lamjung District
- Ghalegaun
