= List of monuments in Dhawalagiri Zone =

Dhawalagiri Zone was one of the fourteen zones of Nepal, comprising four districts, namely, Baglung, Mustang, Myagdi and Parbat. Here is district wise List of Monuments which is in the Dhawalagiri Zone.

== Dhawalagiri Zone ==
- List of monuments in Baglung District
- List of monuments in Myagdi District
- List of monuments in Mustang District
- List of monuments in Parbat District
