= Gaunsahar =

Gaunshahar गाउँशहर (in Nepali)
- City
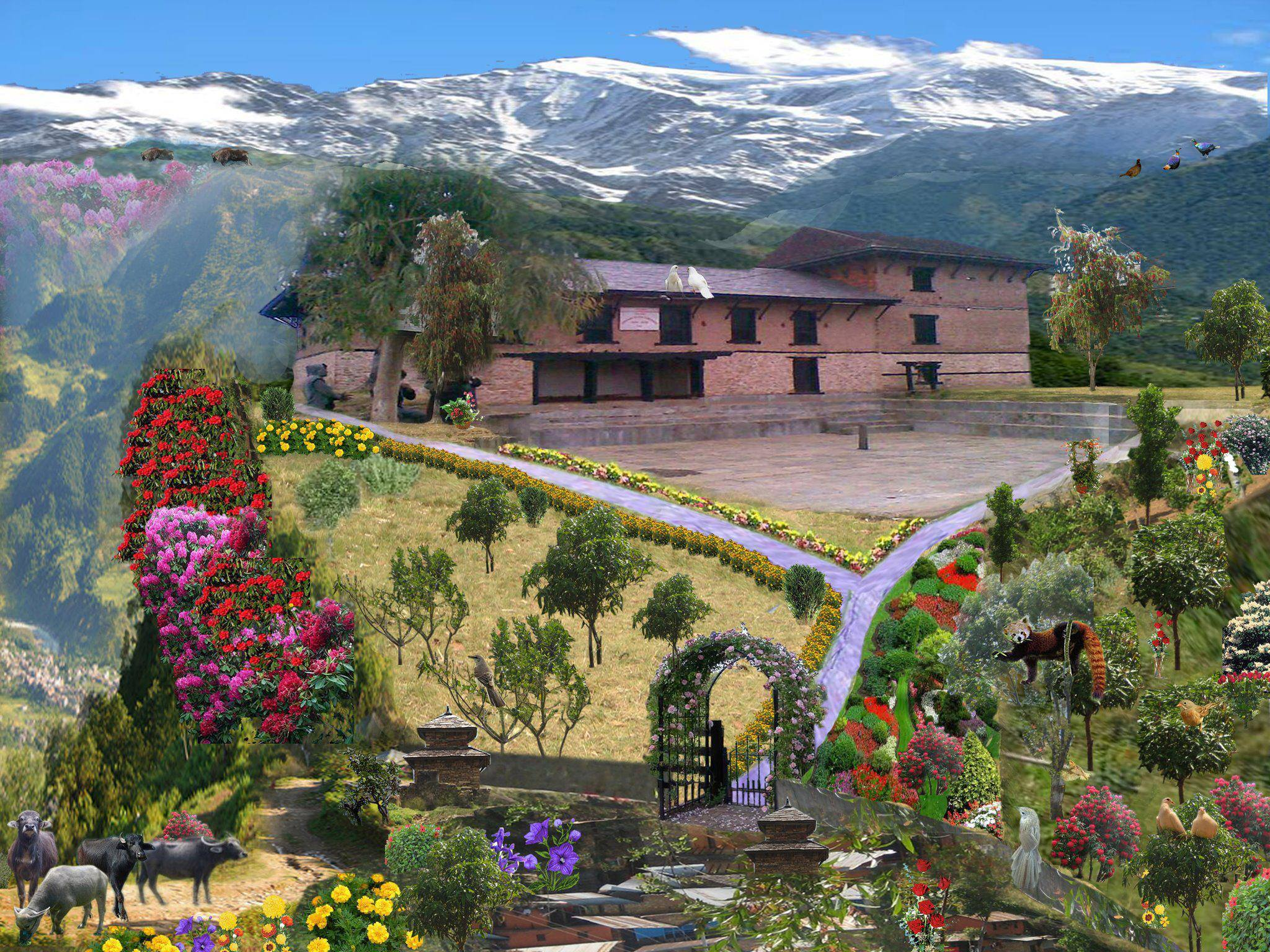
- Painting of Lamjung Durbar

- Location in Nepal Gaunshahar (Nepal)
- Country: Nepal
- Province: Gandaki Province
- District: Lamjung District

Government
  - Type: Besishahar Municipality

Population (2011)
  - Total: 6,611
- Time zone: UTC+5:45 (Nepal Time)
- Postal Code: 33600
- Area code: 066

Gaunshahar (Nepali: गाउँशहर) is a town and market place at Besishahar Municipality in Lamjung District in Gandaki Province of northern-central Nepal. The Besishahar Municipality was formed by merging the existing Village Development Committees i.e. Besishahar, Gaunshahar, Udipur & Chandisthan on May 15, 2014. The temple of Lamjung Kalika & Lamjung Durbar are located here. This place is on the way to Annapurna Conservation Area. The Dumre-Besishahar-Chame highway also goes from this place. Here are different casts and religions.

== Population ==
At the time of the 2011 Nepal census it had a population of 6,611 (3,752 Female & 2,859 Male) people living in 1,757 individual Households.

== Media ==
Gaunshahar has one FM Radio station Radio Lamjung – 88.4 MHz. Radio Chautari 91.4 MHz. This is a Community Radio station.

== See also ==
- Besishahar Municipality
- Udipur
- Chandisthan
- Lamjung District
