= List of monuments in Gandaki Province =

Gandaki Province or Gandaki Pradesh (Nepali: गण्डकी प्रदेश) is one of the seven federal provinces of Nepal established by the country's new constitution of 20 September 2015, comprising eleven districts, namely, Baglung, Gorkha, Kaski, Lamjung, Manang, Mustang, Myagdi, Nawalpur, Parbat, Syangja and Tanahun. This province is formerly known as Province No. 4. There are many categorized monument sites in Gandaki Province. Here is district wise List of Monuments which is in the Gandaki Province.

== Lists per district of Gandaki Province ==
- List of monuments in Baglung District
- List of monuments in Gorkha District
- List of monuments in Kaski District
- List of monuments in Lamjung District
- List of monuments in Manang District
- List of monuments in Mustang District
- List of monuments in Myagdi District
- List of monuments in Nawalpur District (see list of monuments in the former Nawalparasi District)
- List of monuments in Parbat District
- List of monuments in Syangja District
- List of monuments in Tanahun District
