= Udipur =

Udipur उदिपुर (in Nepali)
- City
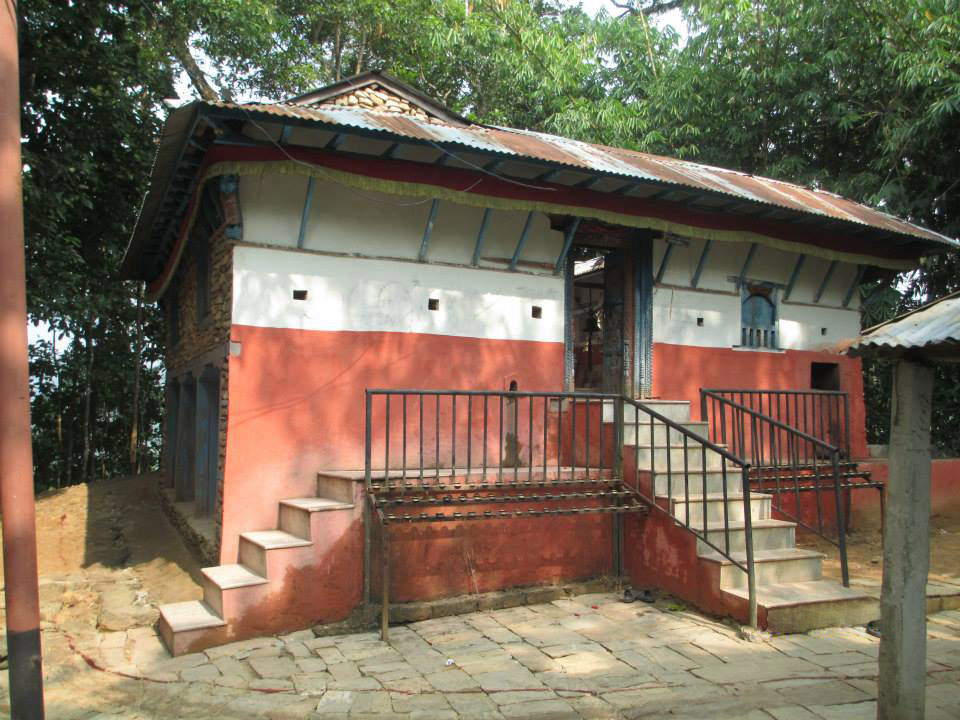
- Udipur Kalika Temple

- Location in Nepal Udipur (Nepal)
- Coordinates: 28.18°N 84.42°E
- Country: Nepal
- Zone: Gandaki Zone
- District: Lamjung District

Government
  - Type: Besishahar Municipality

Population (2011)
  - Total: 2,692
- Time zone: UTC+5:45 (Nepal Time)
- Postal Code: 33608 (Phaliyasanghu, Udipur)
- Area code: 066

Udipur (Nepali: उदीपुर) is a town and market place at Besishahar Municipality in Lamjung District in the Gandaki Zone of northern-central Nepal. The Besishahar Municipality was formed by merging the existing Village Development Committees i.e. Besishahar, Gaunshahar, Udipur & Chandisthan on May 15, 2014. Middle Marshyandi Hydro Electricity is located in this place. The famous temple of Udipur Kalika is located here. This place is in the way of Annapurna Conservation Area. The Dumre-Besishahar-Chame highway also goes from this place. Here are different casts and religions.

== Population ==
At the time of the 2011 Nepal census it had a population of 2,692(1,482 Female & 1,210 Male) people living in 698 individual Households.

== Photos of Udipur ==
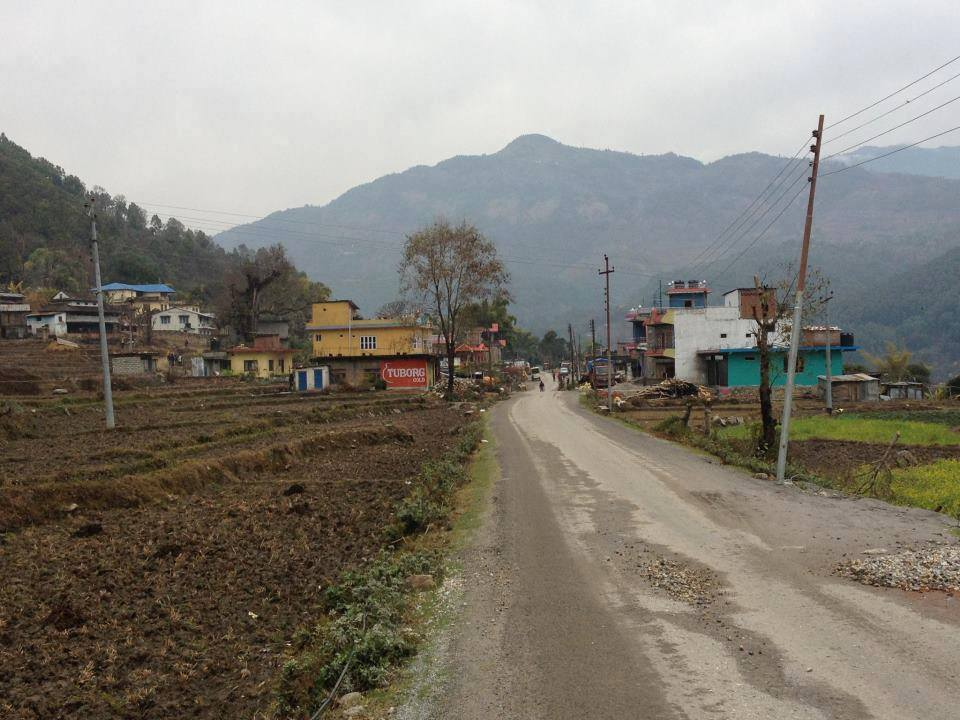
Udipur Bazar

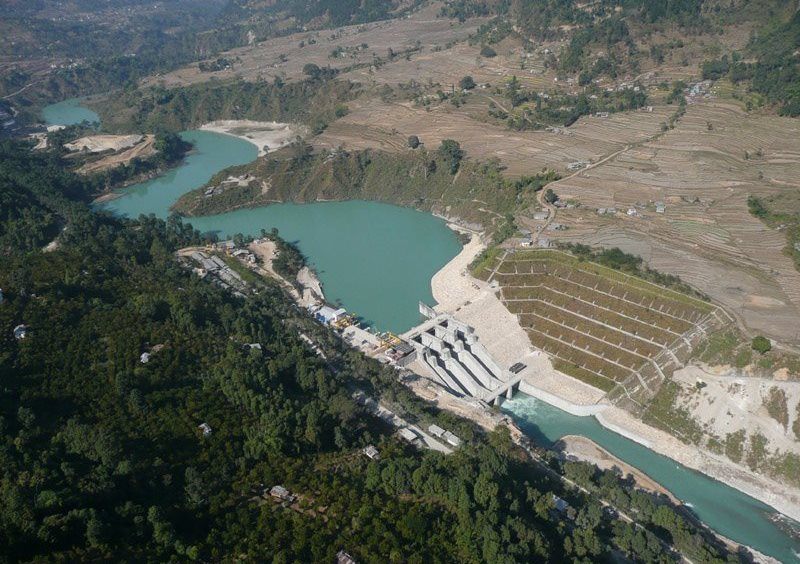
Middle Marshyandi Hydro Electricity Dam Phaliyasanghu, Udipur

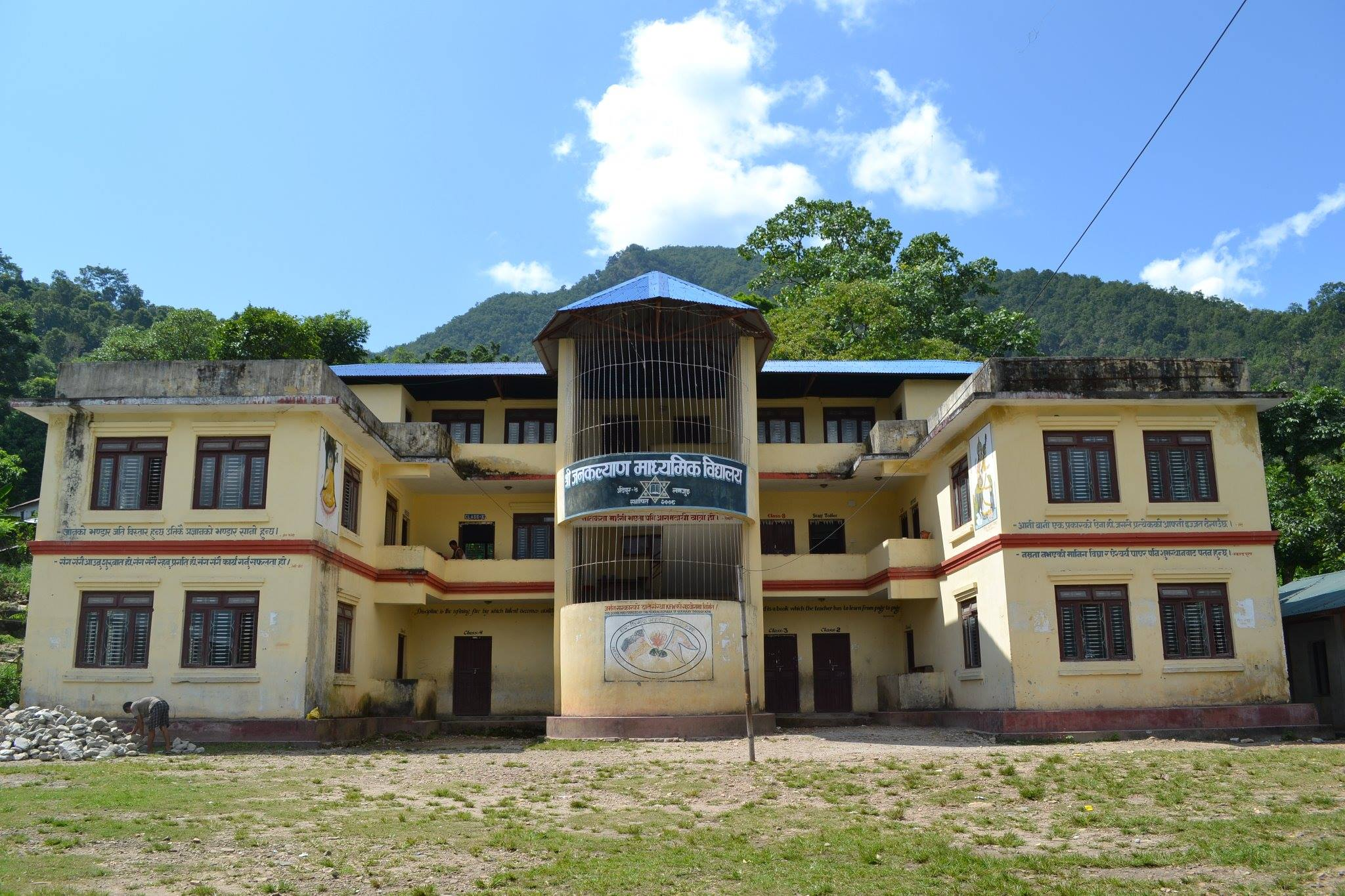
Shree Jana Kalyan Secondary School, Udipur

== See also ==
- Besishahar Municipality
- Gaunshahar
- Chandisthan
- Lamjung District
- DUDAMUKH
- Udipur is divided into besisahar1and2 municipality
