= List of monuments in Baglung, Nepal =

This is a list of monuments in Baglung District, Nepal as officially recognized by and available through the Department of Archaeology, Nepal. Baglung is a district of Gandaki Province and is located in western Nepal.

== List of monuments ==
ID	Name	Type	Location	District	Coordinates	Image
NP-BGL-01	Guguma cave			Baglung		Upload Photo Upload Photo
NP-BGL-02	Kalika Bhagawati Temple			Baglung	28°15′20″N 83°36′41″E	Kalika Bhagawati Temple Upload Photo
NP-BGL-03	Jangeshwar Mahadev			Baglung		Upload Photo Upload Photo
NP-BGL-04	Narshingkot Durga Temple			Baglung		Upload Photo Upload Photo
NP-BGL-05	Khadgakot			Baglung		Upload Photo Upload Photo
NP-BGL-06	Karikot Bhume			Baglung		Upload Photo Upload Photo
NP-BGL-07	Majhkot Bhume			Baglung		Upload Photo Upload Photo
NP-BGL-08	Upallachaur Darbar Kshetra ruins			Baglung		Upload Photo Upload Photo

== See also ==
- List of monuments in Nepal
- List of monuments in Gandaki Province
