= Chiti =

Chiti चिती
- Location in Nepal Chiti (Nepal)
- Coordinates: 28.20°N 84.43°E
- Country: Nepal
- Province: Gandaki Province
- District: Lamjung District
- Municipality: Besisahar Municipality

Area
  - Total: 17.62 km^{2} (6.80 sq mi)

Population (2011)
  - Total: 5,166
  - Density: 293.2/km^{2} (759.4/sq mi)
- Time zone: UTC+5:45 (Nepal Time)

Chiti (Nepali: चिती) is a village and the 11th ward of Besisahar Municipality in Lamjung District in the Gandaki Province of northern-central Nepal. It is also a former village development committee of Lamjung District out of 61. At the time of the 2011 Nepal census it had a population of 5166, and it covers the area of 17.62 square kilometer.
