= Chandisthan =

Chandisthan चण्डीस्थान (in Nepali)
- City
- Location in Nepal Chandisthan (Nepal)
- Coordinates: 28.25°N 84.36°E
- Country: Nepal
- Province: Gandaki Province
- District: Lamjung District

Government
  - Type: Besishahar Municipality

Population (2011)
  - Total: 1,895
- Time zone: UTC+5:45 (Nepal Time)
- Postal Code: 33600
- Area code: 066

Chandisthan (Nepali: चण्डीस्थान) is a town and market place at Besishahar Municipality in Lamjung District in Gandaki Province of northern-central Nepal. The Besishahar Municipality was formed by merging the existing Village Development Committees i.e. Besishahar, Gaunshahar, Udipur & Chandisthan on 15 May 2014.

== Population ==
At the time of the 2011 Nepal census it had a population of 1,895(1,031 Female & 864 Male) people living in 492 individual Households.

== See also ==
- Besishahar Municipality
- Gaunshahar
- Udipur
- Lamjung District
