= List of monuments in Lamjung, Nepal =

This is a list of monuments in Lamjung District, Nepal as officially recognized by and available through the website of the Department of Archaeology, Nepal. Lamjung is a district of Gandaki Province and is located in central Nepal.

== List of monuments ==
ID	Name	Type	Location	District	Coordinates	Image
NP-LJ-01	Bhimsen Temple			Lamjung		Upload Photo Upload Photo
NP-LJ-02	Laxminarayan Temple			Lamjung		Upload Photo Upload Photo
NP-LJ-03	Talungkot kalika			Lamjung		Upload Photo Upload Photo
NP-LJ-04	Lamjung Darawar			Lamjung		Lamjung Darawar Upload Photo

== See also ==
- List of monuments in Gandaki Province
- List of monuments in Nepal
