= List of monuments in Parbat, Nepal =

This is a list of monuments in Parbat District, Nepal as officially recognized by and available through the Department of Archaeology, Nepal. Parbat is a district of Gandaki Province and is located in central western Nepal.

== List of monuments ==
ID	Name	Type	Location	District	Coordinates	Image
NP-PAR-01	Takamkot			Parbat		Upload Photo Upload Photo
NP-PAR-02	Satyanarayan Temple			Parbat		Upload Photo Upload Photo
NP-PAR-03	Dhaneshwar Mahadev temple			Parbat		Upload Photo Upload Photo
NP-PAR-04	Kernel Darbar			Parbat		Upload Photo Upload Photo
NP-PAR-05	Giddeshwar Mahadev temple			Parbat		Upload Photo Upload Photo
NP-PAR-06	Puarneshwar Shivalaya Temple			Parbat		Upload Photo Upload Photo
NP-PAR-07	Jimire Durga Bhagawati temple			Parbat		Upload Photo Upload Photo
NP-PAR-08	Durlung Kot temple			Parbat		Upload Photo Upload Photo
NP-PAR-09	Paiyukot Kalika			Parbat		Upload Photo Upload Photo
NP-PAR-10	Dhuwakot Kali Temple			Parbat		Upload Photo Upload Photo
NP-PAR-11	Kamadhenu Mandir			Parbat		Upload Photo Upload Photo

== See also ==
- List of monuments in Nepal
- List of monuments in Gandaki Province
