= Nalma =

Nalma नाल्मा
- Village development committee
- Location in Nepal Nalma (Nepal)
- Coordinates: 28.21°N 84.30°E
- Country: Nepal
- Zone: Gandaki Zone
- District: Lamjung District

Population (1991)
  - Total: 2,082
- Time zone: UTC+5:45 (Nepal Time)

Nalma is a village development committee in Lamjung District in the Gandaki Zone of northern-central Nepal. At the time of the 1991 Nepal census it had a population of 2082 people living in 409 individual households. The villages of Nalma VDC are as follows:

1. Jyarkhang
2. Bakhrijagat
3. Syare, Lausibot, Kochme
4. Puran Gaun
5. Gairi Gaun
6. Danda Gaun
7. Bartu
8. Chodo khora
9. Fedi
10. Ramche Khola

Population by ward no. as per National Population Census 2011

DISTRICT: Lamjung		V.D.C./MUNICIPALITY : Nalma
WARD	HOUSEHOLD	POPULATION
WARD	HOUSEHOLD	TOTAL	MALE	FEMALE
1	89	325	141	184
2	80	337	161	176
3	25	74	30	44
4	37	139	64	75
5	44	154	72	82
6	36	140	70	70
7	47	241	120	121
8	37	160	66	94
9	43	209	103	106
TOTAL	438	1,779	827	952
