= List of monuments in Gorkha, Nepal =

This is a list of monuments in Gorkha District, Nepal as officially recognized by and available through the website of the Department of Archaeology, Nepal. Gorkha is a district of Gandaki Province and is located in northern central Nepal. Royal palaces and Hindu temples are the main attraction of this district.

== List of monuments ==
ID	Name	Type	Location	District	Coordinates	Image
NP-GK-01	Rameshwar Temple n Monuments around			Gorkha		Upload Photo Upload Photo
NP-GK-02	Gorkha Palace			Gorkha		Gorkha Palace Upload Photo
NP-GK-03	Murlidhar Narayan Temple			Gorkha		Upload Photo Upload Photo
NP-GK-04	Mankaamna Temple			Gorkha		Mankaamna Temple Upload Photo
NP-GK-05	Bhim Vireshwar Temple			Gorkha		Upload Photo Upload Photo
NP-GK-06	Khagyu Cholidagh Gumba			Gorkha		Upload Photo Upload Photo
NP-GK-07	Radha Vallabeshwar Temple			Gorkha		Upload Photo Upload Photo
NP-GK-08	Ganesh Temple			Gorkha		Upload Photo Upload Photo
NP-GK-09	Siranchokkot srinath mandali			Gorkha		Upload Photo Upload Photo
NP-GK-10	Birimkali			Gorkha		Upload Photo Upload Photo
NP-GK-11	Bhimsen Temple			Gorkha		Upload Photo Upload Photo
NP-GK-12	Rajganesh Temple			Gorkha		Upload Photo Upload Photo
NP-GK-13	Sringi Gumba			Gorkha		Upload Photo Upload Photo
NP-GK-14	Ligligkot		Palungtar	Gorkha		Ligligkot Upload Photo
NP-GK-15	Khanyi at Ripchet			Chhekampar		Khanyi at Ripchet Upload Photo

== See also ==
- List of monuments in Gandaki Province
- List of monuments in Nepal
