= List of monuments in Kaski, Nepal =

This is a list of monuments in Kaski District, Nepal as officially recognized by and available through the website of the Department of Archaeology, Nepal. Kaski is a district of Gandaki Province and is located in western central Nepal. Hindu temples are the main attraction of this district.

== List of monuments ==
| ID | Name | Type | Location | District | Coordinates | Image |
|---|---|---|---|---|---|---|
| NP-KK-01 | Vindhyavasini Temple | | Pokhara | Kaski | | Vindhyavasini Temple Upload Photo |
| NP-KK-02 | Bhimsen Temple | | Pokhara | Kaski | | Upload Photo Upload Photo |
| NP-KK-03 | Guptkali (Kaskikot) Parisar | | | Kaski | | Upload Photo Upload Photo |
| NP-KK-04 | Harihar Cave | | | Kaski | | Upload Photo Upload Photo |
| NP-KK-05 | Bhadrakali Temple | | Pokhara | Kaski | | Bhadrakali Temple Upload Photo |
| NP-KK-06 | Bhagawati Temple | | | Kaski | | Upload Photo Upload Photo |
| NP-KK-07 | Laxminarayan Temple | | | Kaski | | Upload Photo Upload Photo |
| NP-KK-08 | Talbarahi | | Phewa Lake island | Kaski | | Talbarahi Upload Photo |
| NP-KK-09 | Khagdagaonkot | | | Kaski | | Upload Photo Upload Photo |
| NP-KK-10 | Pangdurkot | | | Kaski | | Upload Photo Upload Photo |
| NP-KK-11 | Ajimala devi Temple | | | Kaski | | Upload Photo Upload Photo |
| NP-KK-12 | Ganesh Temple | | | Kaski | | Upload Photo Upload Photo |

== See also ==
- List of monuments in Gandaki Province
- List of monuments in Nepal
