= List of monuments in Syangja, Nepal =

This is a list of monuments in Syangja District, Nepal as officially recognized by and available through the website of the Department of Archaeology, Nepal. Syangja is a district of Gandaki Province and is located in western Nepal. Hindu temples are the main attraction of this district.

== List of monuments ==
ID	Name	Type	Location	District	Coordinates	Image
NP-SG-01	Alam Devi Temple			Syangja		Alam Devi Temple Upload Photo
NP-SG-02	Arukharka Shivalaya			Syangja		Upload Photo Upload Photo
NP-SG-03	Bishnu Temple			Syangja		Upload Photo Upload Photo
NP-SG-04	Satahukot			Syangja		Upload Photo Upload Photo
NP-SG-05	Keladighat Temple		Sankhar	Syangja		Upload Photo Upload Photo
NP-SG-06	Bhalupahad		Putalibazar	Syangja		Upload Photo Upload Photo

== See also ==
- List of monuments in Gandaki Province
- List of monuments in Nepal
