= List of monuments in Myagdi, Nepal =

This is a list of monuments in Myagdi District, Nepal as officially recognized by and available through the Department of Archaeology, Nepal. Myagdi is a district of Gandaki Province and is located in central western Nepal.

== List of monuments ==
ID	Name	Type	Location	District	Coordinates	Image
NP-MY-01	Pamjakot (Mulbare Dhuri) Bhure Raja's Darbar area Pagjakot			Myagdi		Upload Photo Upload Photo
NP-MY-02	Balmukteshwar Mahadev temple			Myagdi		Upload Photo Upload Photo
NP-MY-03	Laxminarayan Temple			Myagdi		Upload Photo Upload Photo
NP-MY-04	Beni Shivalaya			Myagdi		Upload Photo Upload Photo
NP-MY-05	Beni Kotbhandar			Myagdi		Upload Photo Upload Photo
NP-MY-06	Jagannath Temple			Myagdi		Upload Photo Upload Photo
NP-MY-07	Ghatankot			Myagdi		Upload Photo Upload Photo
NP-MY-08	Dolthan			Myagdi		Upload Photo Upload Photo

== See also ==
- List of monuments in Nepal
- List of monuments in Gandaki Province
