= List of monuments in Mustang, Nepal =

This is a list of monuments in Mustang District, Nepal as officially recognized by and available through the Department of Archaeology, Nepal. Mustang is a district of Gandaki Province and is located in central northern Nepal.

== List of monuments ==
ID	Name	Type	Location	District	Coordinates	Image
NP-MS-01	Temple of Thakurbaba			Mustang		Upload Photo Upload Photo
NP-MS-02	Muktinath temple (Jhikbucche Gompa) (Nyingma)		Rani Pauwa	Mustang	28°49′03″N 83°52′13″E	Muktinath temple (Jhikbucche Gompa) (Nyingma) Upload Photo
NP-MS-03	Kag Choede Thupten Samfeling Gumba (Sakya)		Kagbeni-8	Mustang	28°50′15″N 83°47′02″E	Upload Photo Upload Photo
NP-MS-04	Lo Ge Kar Gumba (Nyingma)		Charang 1 (opp Saure)	Mustang	29°07′28″N 83°53′20″E	Lo Ge Kar Gumba (Nyingma) Upload Photo
NP-MS-05	Lo Manthang Palace Fort and other Monuments			Mustang	29°10′58″N 83°57′25″E	Lo Manthang Palace Fort and other Monuments Upload Photo
NP-MS-06	Yara Gumba Cave			Mustang		Upload Photo Upload Photo
NP-MS-07	Mekyi Lhakhang Gumba		Kobang	Mustang	28°41′21″N 83°37′04″E	Upload Photo Upload Photo
NP-MS-08	Narsang Gumba		Kanti, Kobang-6	Mustang	28°41′45″N 83°37′14″E	Upload Photo Upload Photo
NP-MS-09	Charang Dzong		Tsarang	Mustang	29°05′34″N 83°56′01″E	Charang Dzong Upload Photo
NP-MS-10	Ghasa Gumba			Mustang		Upload Photo Upload Photo
NP-MS-11	Mane Parkhal			Mustang		Upload Photo Upload Photo
NP-MS-12	Mahakala Gumba		Tukuche	Mustang	28°42′32″N 83°38′37″E	Upload Photo Upload Photo
NP-MS-13	Rani Gumba		Tukuche	Mustang	28°42′27″N 83°38′36″E	Upload Photo Upload Photo
NP-MS-14	Samba Gompa		Tukuche	Mustang	28°42′39″N 83°38′41″E	Samba Gompa Upload Photo
NP-MS-15	Tukuche's Mane		Tukuche	Mustang	28°42′30″N 83°38′39″E	Upload Photo Upload Photo
NP-MS-16	Tukuche's Kani (gate chorten)		Tukuche	Mustang	28°42′31″N 83°38′40″E	Upload Photo Upload Photo
NP-MS-17	Gholam Bir Gumba / Jwala Mai/ rDo la me 'Bar		Rani Pauwa, Muktinath-1	Mustang	28°48′56″N 83°52′14″E	Upload Photo Upload Photo
NP-MS-18	Chhairo Gumba /Tashi Shagagh Jyochen Chhoyokhor /Chandanbari Gompa		Chhairo (N of Chhairo village, nr tib refugee camp)	Mustang	28°44′17″N 83°40′58″E	Upload Photo Upload Photo
NP-MS-19	Sambatenling Gumba			Mustang		Upload Photo Upload Photo
NP-MS-20	Urgen Chyokorling Gumba (Nyingma)		Marpha-6	Mustang	28°45′13″N 83°41′10″E	Upload Photo Upload Photo
NP-MS-21	Bhumbo Gumba			Mustang		Upload Photo Upload Photo
NP-MS-22	sKu Tsab gTer lNga Gumba		Thini	Mustang	28°45′54″N 83°42′30″E	Upload Photo Upload Photo
NP-MS-23	Mane Parkhal Chhorten			Mustang		Upload Photo Upload Photo
NP-MS-24	Chhorten			Mustang		Chhorten Upload Photo
NP-MS-25	Jhar Choede Rigdol Phuncholing Gumba (Sakya)		Jharkot?	Mustang		Upload Photo Upload Photo
NP-MS-26	Chhorten of Jajarkot			Mustang		Upload Photo Upload Photo
NP-MS-27	Rani Pauwa			Mustang		Upload Photo Upload Photo
NP-MS-28	Ghar Gumba (Kagyu)		Muktinath-1	Mustang		Upload Photo Upload Photo
NP-MS-29	Meng Khang Gumba			Mustang		Upload Photo Upload Photo
NP-MS-30	Gumba Gang (Ani) Gumba			Mustang		Upload Photo Upload Photo
NP-MS-31	Chhognam Gumba			Mustang		Upload Photo Upload Photo
NP-MS-32	Palsa Ngor Tashi Chholing Gumba (Sakya)		Ghami-2	Mustang		Upload Photo Upload Photo
NP-MS-33	Ghar phug Gumba (Nyingma)		Chhoser-1	Mustang		Upload Photo Upload Photo
NP-MS-34	Ghami Mane parkhal		Ghami	Mustang	29°03′46″N 83°52′47″E	Upload Photo Upload Photo
NP-MS-35	Nefug Namdol Gumba			Mustang		Upload Photo Upload Photo
NP-MS-36	Charang Thupten Shedup Dhargeling Gumba		Tsarang-9	Mustang	29°05′34″N 83°56′02″E	Charang Thupten Shedup Dhargeling Gumba Upload Photo
NP-MS-37	Palsa Ngor Tashi Chholing Gumba			Mustang		Upload Photo Upload Photo
NP-MS-38	Garwang Gumba			Mustang		Upload Photo Upload Photo
NP-MS-39	Shedrup Dhargeling Gumba		Tsarang	Mustang	29°05′28″N 83°56′00″E	Upload Photo Upload Photo
NP-MS-40	Namgyal Thupten Thargeling Gumba		Chhonhup	Mustang	29°11′25″N 83°56′49″E	Upload Photo Upload Photo
NP-MS-41	Charang Chhorten		Tsarang	Mustang		Charang Chhorten Upload Photo
NP-MS-42	Ghami Chhorten		Ghami	Mustang		Ghami Chhorten Upload Photo
NP-MS-43	Samar Chhorten		Samar	Mustang	28°57′43″N 83°48′08″E	Upload Photo Upload Photo
NP-MS-44	Kovang cave			Mustang		Upload Photo Upload Photo
NP-MS-45	Sauruka Caves			Mustang		Upload Photo Upload Photo
NP-MS-46	Tukuche's Caves			Mustang		Upload Photo Upload Photo
NP-MS-47	Chokhopani's Caves			Mustang		Upload Photo Upload Photo
NP-MS-48	Garab jong (Thini dzong ruins?)		Thini?	Mustang	28°45′59″N 83°43′22″E	Upload Photo Upload Photo
NP-MS-49	Kagbeni Killa Darbar		Kagbeni	Mustang	28°50′14″N 83°47′02″E	Kagbeni Killa Darbar Upload Photo
NP-MS-50	Khinga archaeological site		Khinga	Mustang	28°49′19″N 83°49′48″E	Upload Photo Upload Photo
NP-MS-51	Jharkot Darbar		Jharkot	Mustang	28°49′09″N 83°50′54″E	Upload Photo Upload Photo
NP-MS-52	Jhong Darbar Killa ruins			Mustang		Upload Photo Upload Photo
NP-MS-53	Caves of Jhong			Mustang		Caves of Jhong Upload Photo
NP-MS-54	Mebrak's archaeological ruins			Mustang		Upload Photo Upload Photo
NP-MS-55	Fujaling			Mustang		Upload Photo Upload Photo
NP-MS-56	Ujadiyeko Basti			Mustang		Upload Photo Upload Photo
NP-MS-57	Ghami Darbar		Ghami	Mustang	29°03′47″N 83°52′24″E	Upload Photo Upload Photo
NP-MS-58	Ani Gumba's ruins			Mustang		Upload Photo Upload Photo
NP-MS-59	Ne?fuga cave			Mustang		Upload Photo Upload Photo
NP-MS-60	Nupchhok cave			Mustang		Upload Photo Upload Photo
NP-MS-61	Rijling cave			Mustang		Upload Photo Upload Photo
NP-MS-62	Gadeling cave			Mustang		Upload Photo Upload Photo
NP-MS-63	Jhongkyor cave			Mustang		Upload Photo Upload Photo
NP-MS-64	Ghami cave			Mustang		Upload Photo Upload Photo
NP-MS-65	Jhong Lumba cave			Mustang		Upload Photo Upload Photo
NP-MS-66	Konjoling cave			Mustang		Upload Photo Upload Photo
NP-MS-67	Chailesthit cave			Mustang		Upload Photo Upload Photo
NP-MS-68	Lo Mangthang Killa (Khechor Jong)			Mustang		Upload Photo Upload Photo
NP-MS-69	Dhakmar Darbar			Mustang		Upload Photo Upload Photo
NP-MS-70	Dhakmar Caves			Mustang	29°05′15″N 83°52′44″E	Upload Photo Upload Photo
NP-MS-71	Chhode Gumba ruins			Mustang		Upload Photo Upload Photo
NP-MS-72	Menche Lawang			Mustang		Upload Photo Upload Photo
NP-MS-73	Marjong cave			Mustang		Upload Photo Upload Photo
NP-MS-74	Chhungsi rangjang cave			Mustang		Upload Photo Upload Photo

== See also ==
- List of monuments in Nepal
- List of monuments in Gandaki Province
