= List of monuments in Manang, Nepal =

This is a list of monuments in Manang District, Nepal as officially recognized by and available through the website of the Department of Archaeology, Nepal. Manang is a district of Gandaki Province and is located in northern Nepal.

== List of monuments ==
ID	Name	Type	Location	District	Coordinates	Image
NP-MA-01	Kundi Gumba			Manang		Upload Photo Upload Photo
NP-MA-02	Thorte Chegi Lemba Gumba			Manang		Upload Photo Upload Photo
NP-MA-03	Pisang Urgen Chhyoling Gumba			Manang		Upload Photo Upload Photo
NP-MA-04	Thalilama Gumba			Manang		Upload Photo Upload Photo
NP-MA-05	Orgen Thekchok Lingi Gumba			Manang		Upload Photo Upload Photo
NP-MA-06	Manang Gumba			Manang		Upload Photo Upload Photo
NP-MA-07	Tare Gumba			Manang		Upload Photo Upload Photo
NP-MA-08	Tasi Lakang Gumba			Manang		Upload Photo Upload Photo
NP-MA-09	Mocho Boko Gumba			Manang		Upload Photo Upload Photo
NP-MA-10	Manme gumba			Manang		Upload Photo Upload Photo

== See also ==
- List of monuments in Gandaki Province
- List of monuments in Nepal
