= Bajhakhet =

Bajhakhet बाँझखेत
- Village development committee
- Location in Nepal Bajhakhet (Nepal)
- Coordinates: 28.26°N 84.40°E
- Country: Nepal
- Zone: Gandaki Zone
- District: Lamjung District

Population (1991)
  - Total: 3,177
- Time zone: UTC+5:45 (Nepal Time)

Bajhakhet is a village development committee in Lamjung District in the Gandaki Zone of northern-central Nepal. At the time of the 1991 Nepal census it had a population of 3177 people living in 625 individual households.

== Media ==
To Promote local culture Bajhakhet has one FM radio station Radio Marsyangdi - 95.0 MHz Which is a Community radio Station.
