= List of monuments in Tanahun, Nepal =

This is a list of monuments in Tanahun District, Nepal as officially recognized by and available through the website of the Department of Archaeology, Nepal. Tanahun is a district of Gandaki Province and is located in central parts of Nepal. Hindu temples are the main attraction of this district.

== List of monuments ==
| ID | Name | Type | Location | District | Coordinates | Image |
|---|---|---|---|---|---|---|
| NP-TH-01 | Mahalakshmi Temple | | | Tanahun | | Upload Photo Upload Photo |
| NP-TH-02 | Bindyabasini Temple | | | Tanahun | | Bindyabasini Temple Upload Photo |
| NP-TH-03 | Mahalakshmi Temple | | | Tanahun | | Upload Photo Upload Photo |
| NP-TH-04 | Khadga Devi Temple | | | Tanahun | | Khadga Devi Temple Upload Photo |
| NP-TH-05 | Luti Barahi | | | Tanahun | | Upload Photo Upload Photo |
| NP-TH-06 | Manimukundeshwor Temple | | | Tanahun | | Upload Photo Upload Photo |
| NP-TH-07 | Rising Kot Darbar | | | Tanahun | | Upload Photo Upload Photo |
| NP-TH-08 | Tanahunsur Parisar Khadgadevi Temple | | | Tanahun | | Upload Photo Upload Photo |
| NP-TH-09 | Ranipokhari | | | Tanahun | | Upload Photo Upload Photo |
| NP-TH-10 | Bhagawati Mai Temple Premise | | | Tanahun | | Upload Photo Upload Photo |
| NP-TH-11 | Bindyabasini Temple | | | Tanahun | | Upload Photo Upload Photo |
| NP-TH-12 | Bhimsen Temple | | | Tanahun | | Upload Photo Upload Photo |
| NP-TH-13 | Gadgeshwar Mahadev | | | Tanahun | | Upload Photo Upload Photo |

== See also ==
- List of monuments in Gandaki Province
- List of monuments in Nepal
