= Kalika Bhagawati Temple =

Hindu temple in Nepal

Baglung Kalika Bhagawati Temple बाग्लुङ कालिका भागवती मन्दिर
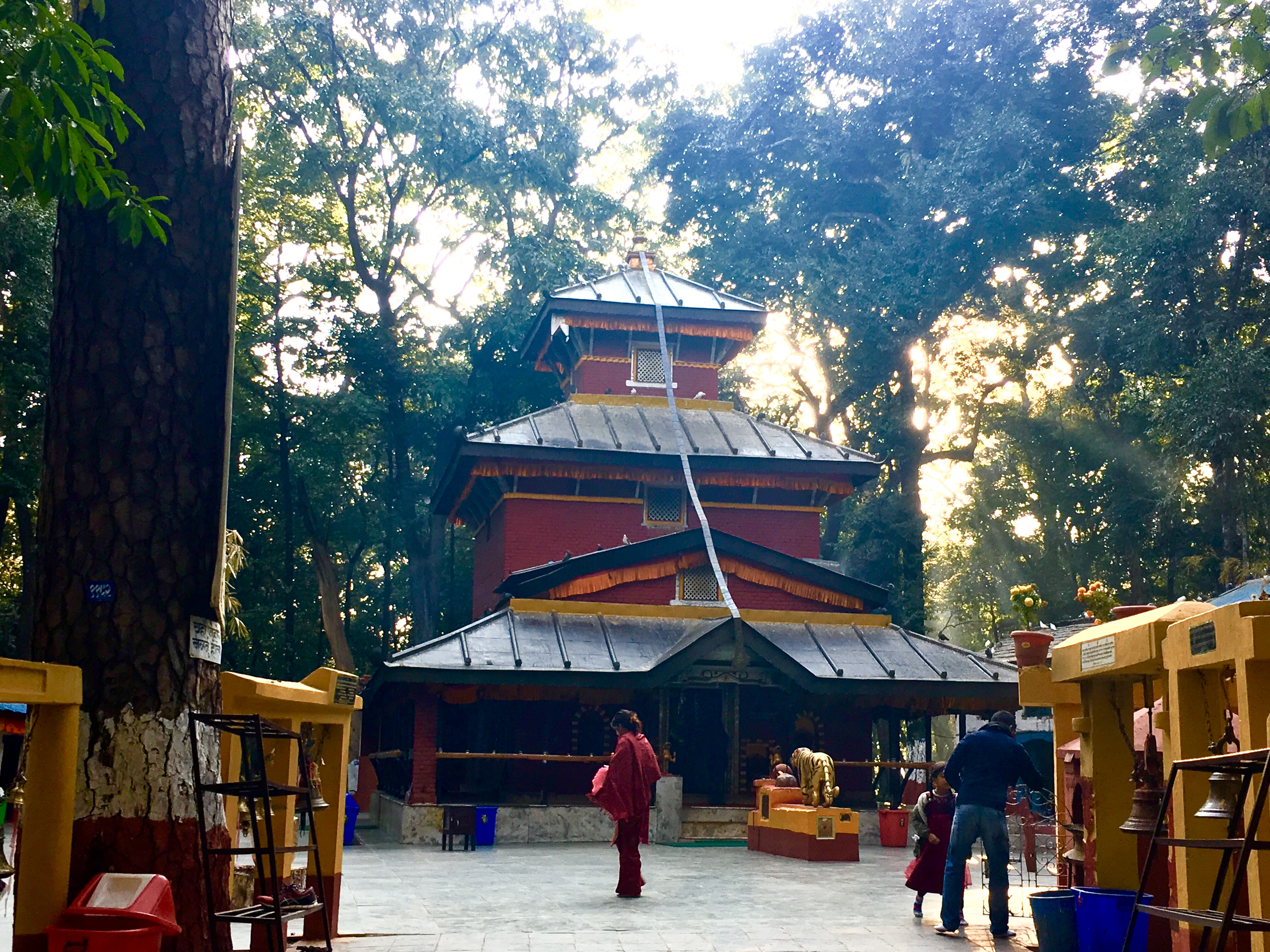

- Location in Nepal

Religion
- Affiliation: Hinduism
- District: Baglung
- Province: Gandaki
- Deity: Kali
- Festivals: Navaratri, Teej, Chaite Dashain

Location
- Location: Baglung
- Country: Nepal
- Interactive map of Baglung Kalika Bhagawati Temple बाग्लुङ कालिका भागवती मन्दिर
- Coordinates: 28°15′21.24″N 83°36′48.88″E

Architecture
- Type: Pagoda

Kalika Bhagawati Temple, also known as Baglung Kalika Bhagawati Temple, is a significant Hindu temple located south-east of the town of Báglung in western Nepal. It is situated on the southern banks of the Kali Gandaki River.

The presiding deity of the temple is Kalika (or Kali), one of the fiercest forms of Shakti, the consort of Shiva. Kalika is one of the main goddess for the Shaiva sect.

The temple courtyard has four entrances in each of the cardinal directions. The temple compound contains a sprawling collection of various other small temples dedicated to Shiva, Radha Krishna, Lakshmi Narayan and others.

The major festival of the temple, Chaite-Dashain, is held on the eighth day of the Shukla Paksha (bright lunar fortnight) of the month of Chaitra, with thousands of devotees visiting. The devotees light oil lamps, perform pooja, rituals and get married with the belief of receiving the Devi's blessings. The other major festival is that of Dashain, which runs from the Shukla Paksha of the month of Ashwin and ending on the Purnima (full moon).

According to local folklore the King of Parbat District, Pratap Narayan Singh Malla, received an idol of goddess Kalika as part of the dowry in his marriage with King Manimukunda Sen's daughter. Whilst returning to his residence after the marriage ceremony, the bride, groom and others from the marriage procession took shelter in the forest. On the following day, not a single person was able to move the idol, so, the king constructed a temple on that spot.

Traditionally devotees practices live animal sacrifices at the temple in the belief that this would enable their wishes to be fulfilled. On 13 April 2016, the sacrificing of pigeons was stopped on the basis that pigeon represents a symbol of peace. The pigeons are instead released from within the temple's grounds.

== Gallery ==
Baglung Kalika Bhagawati Temple scenes
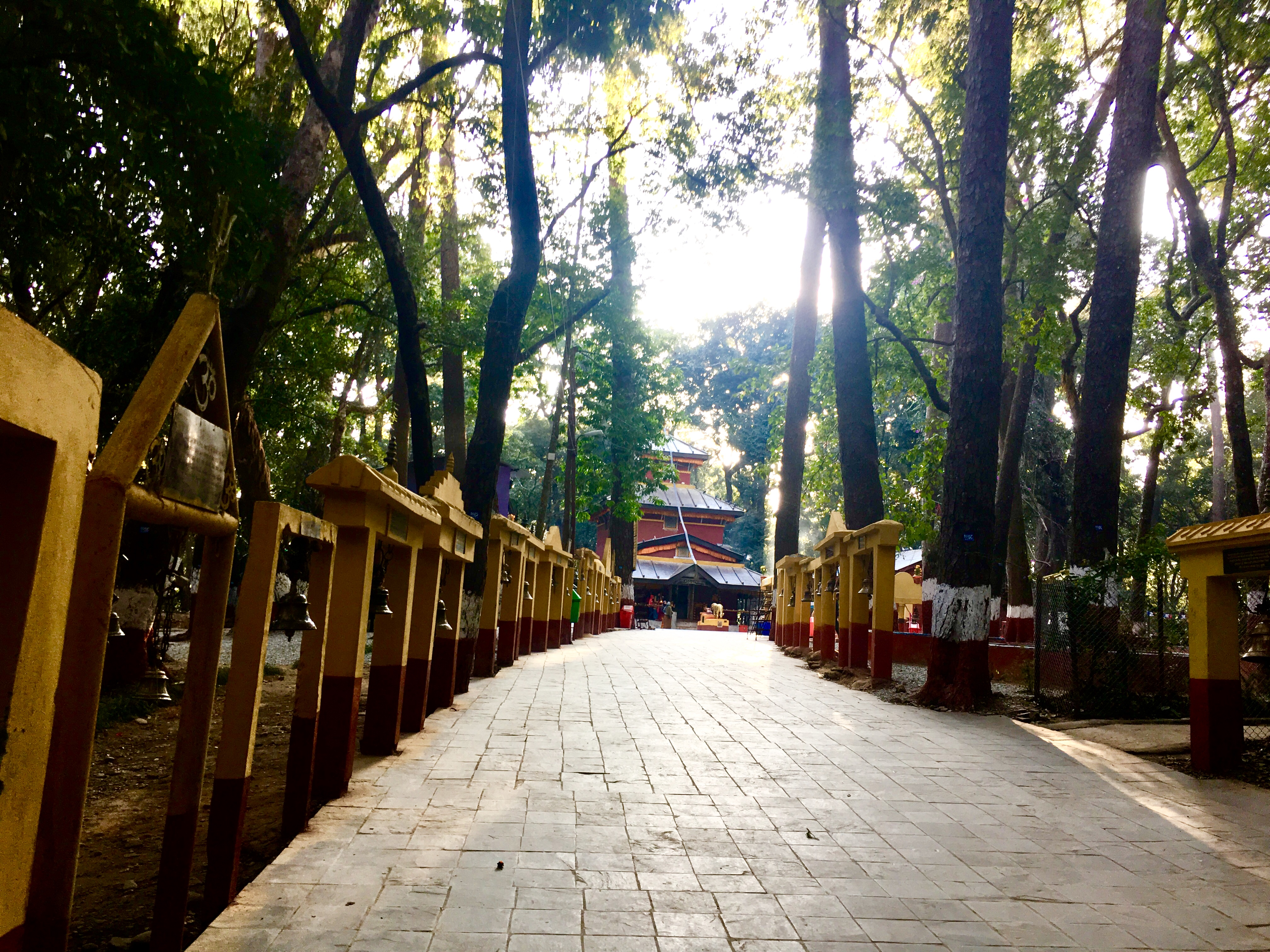
Front view of Baglung Kalika Bhagawati Temple

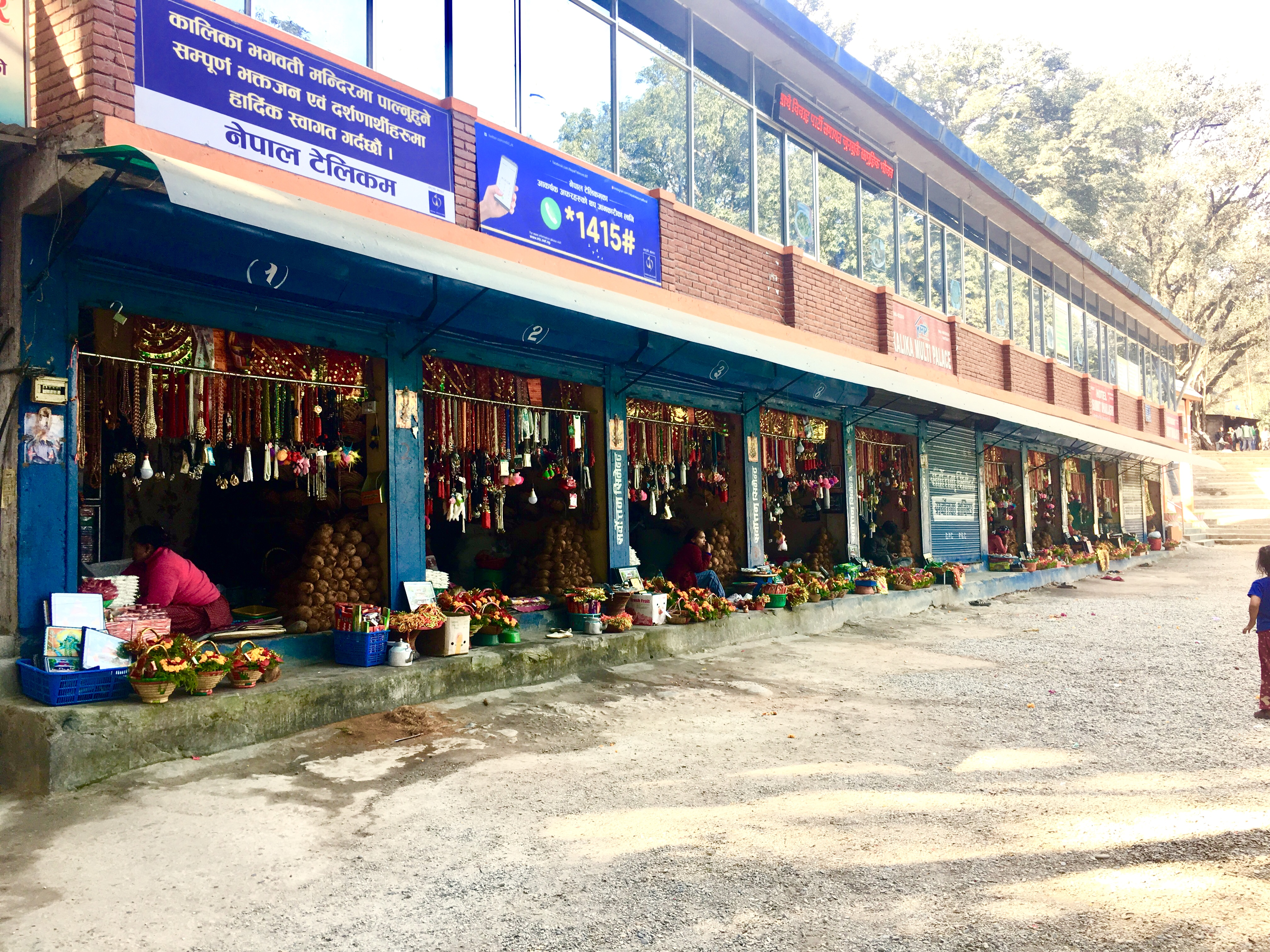
Marketplace to buy Puja materials

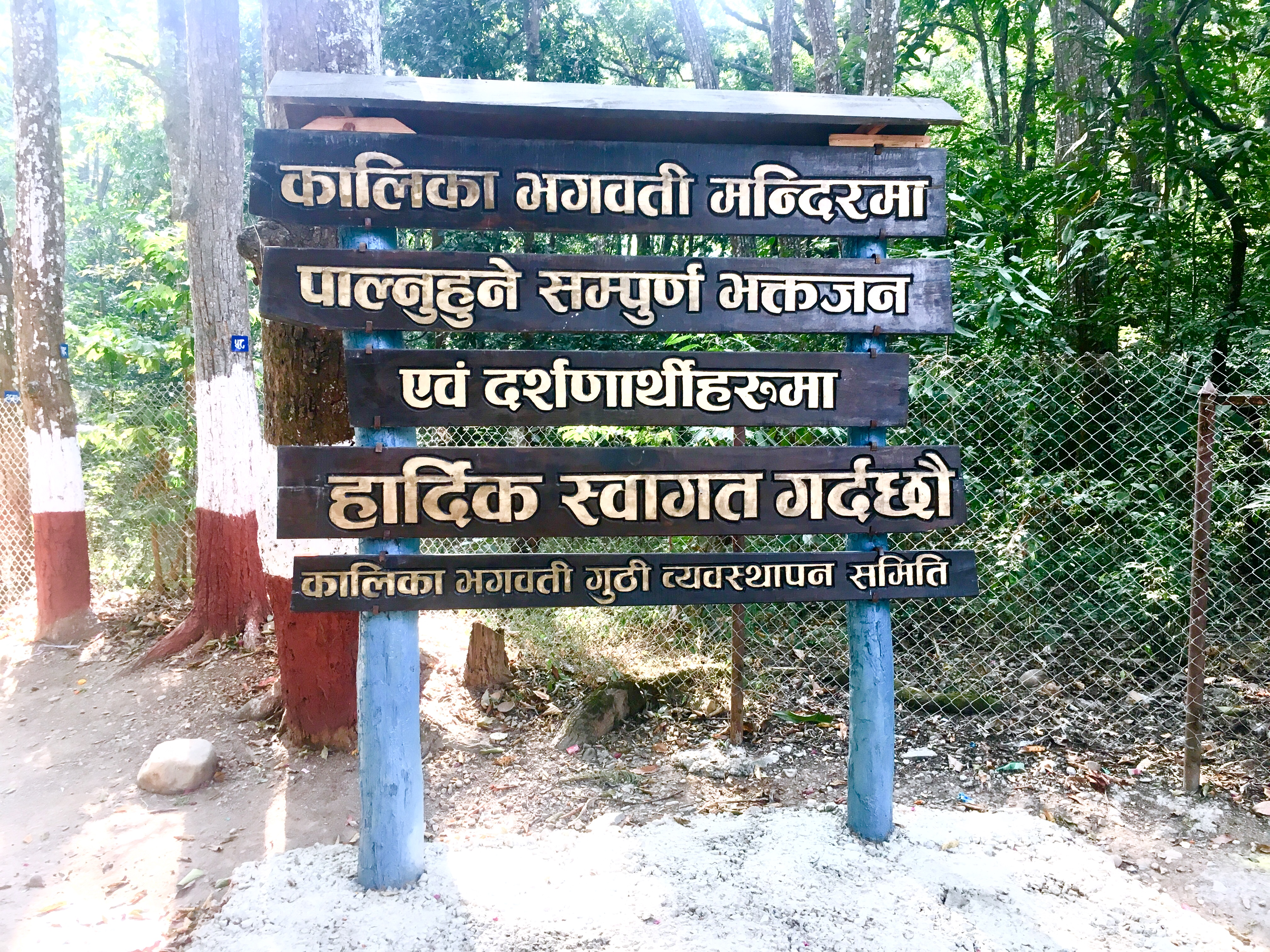
A Board welcomes all the devotees and visitors in Temple

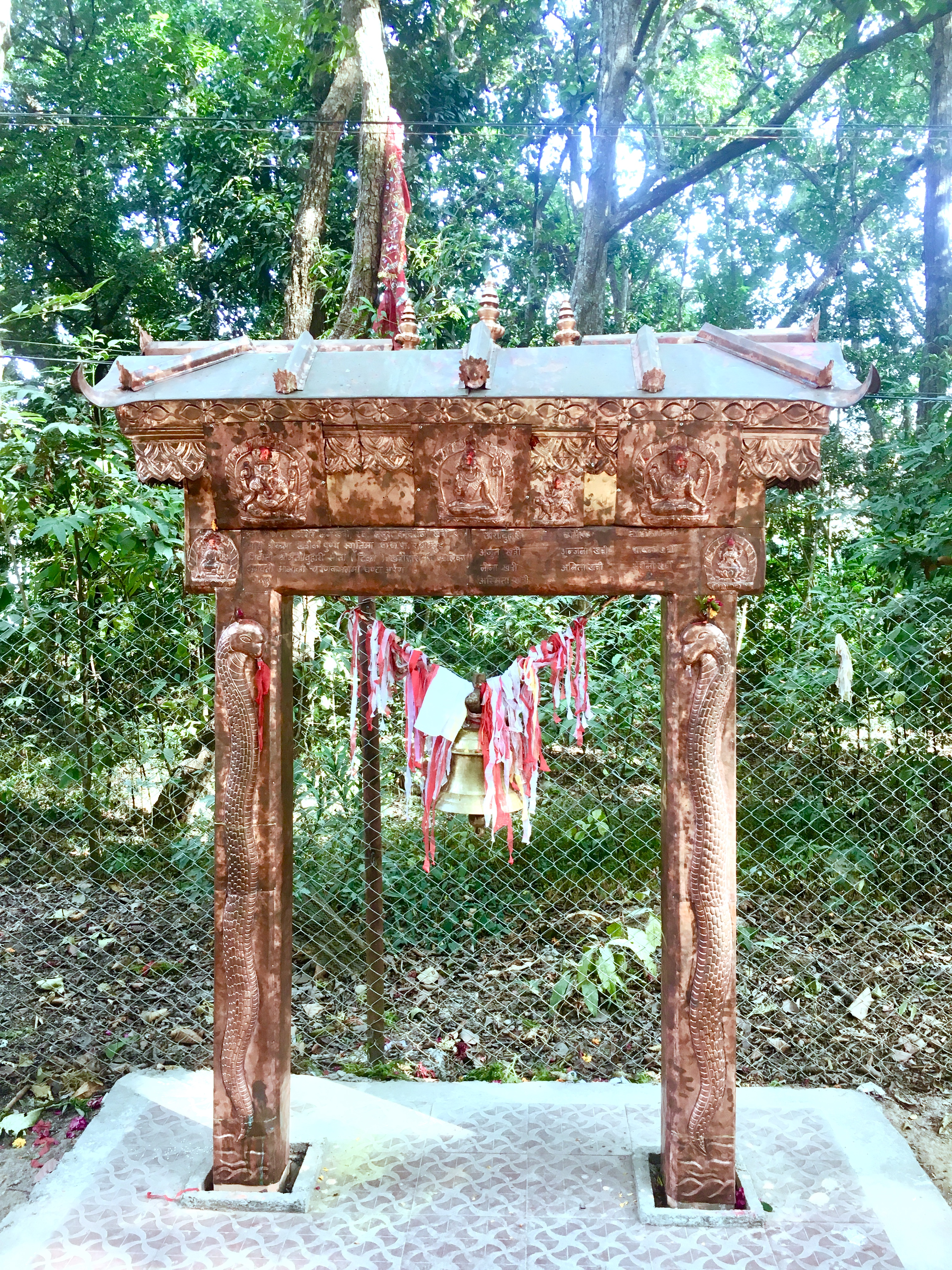
Copper Bell on the way to Temple

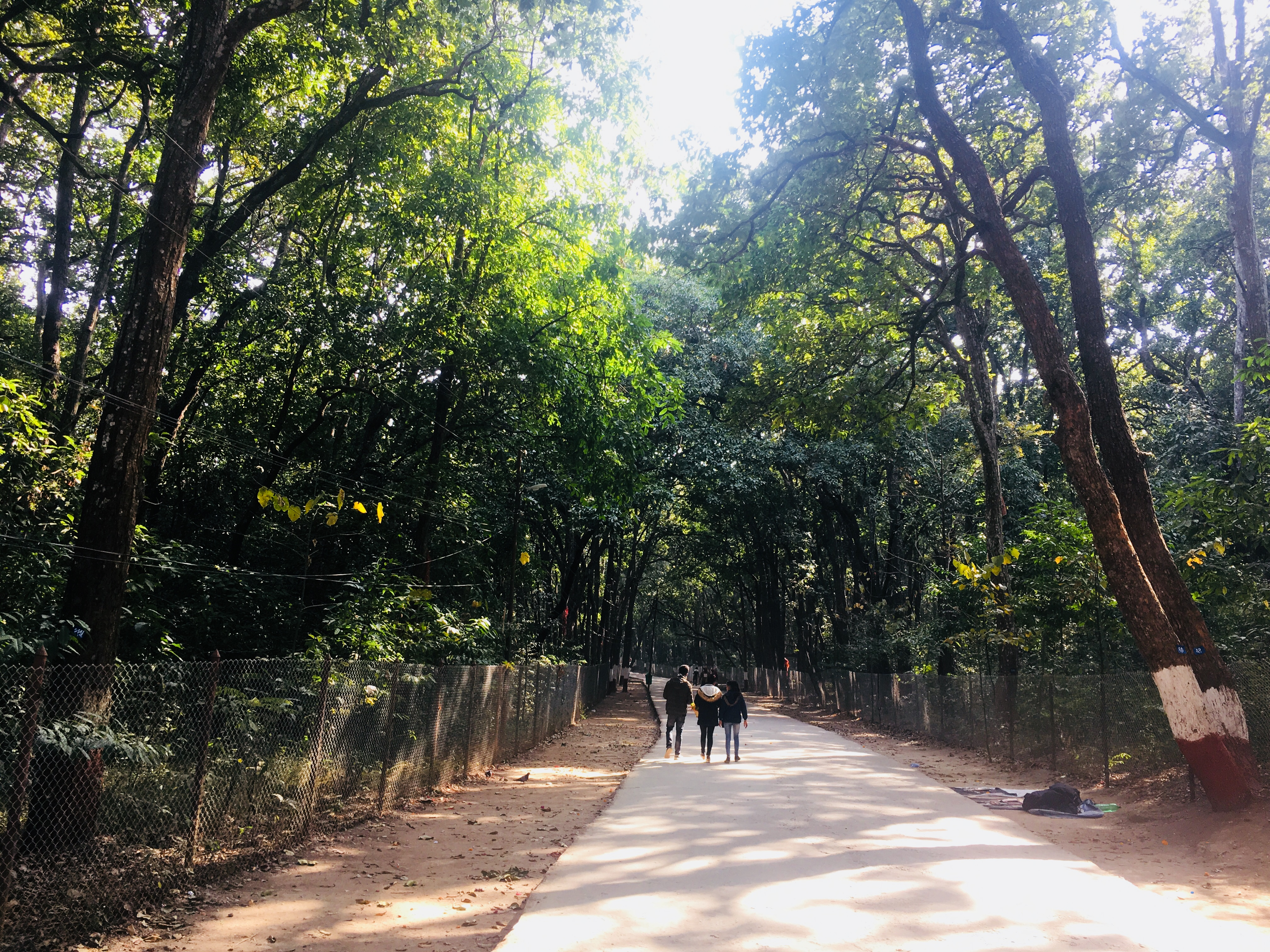
Way to Temple through forest

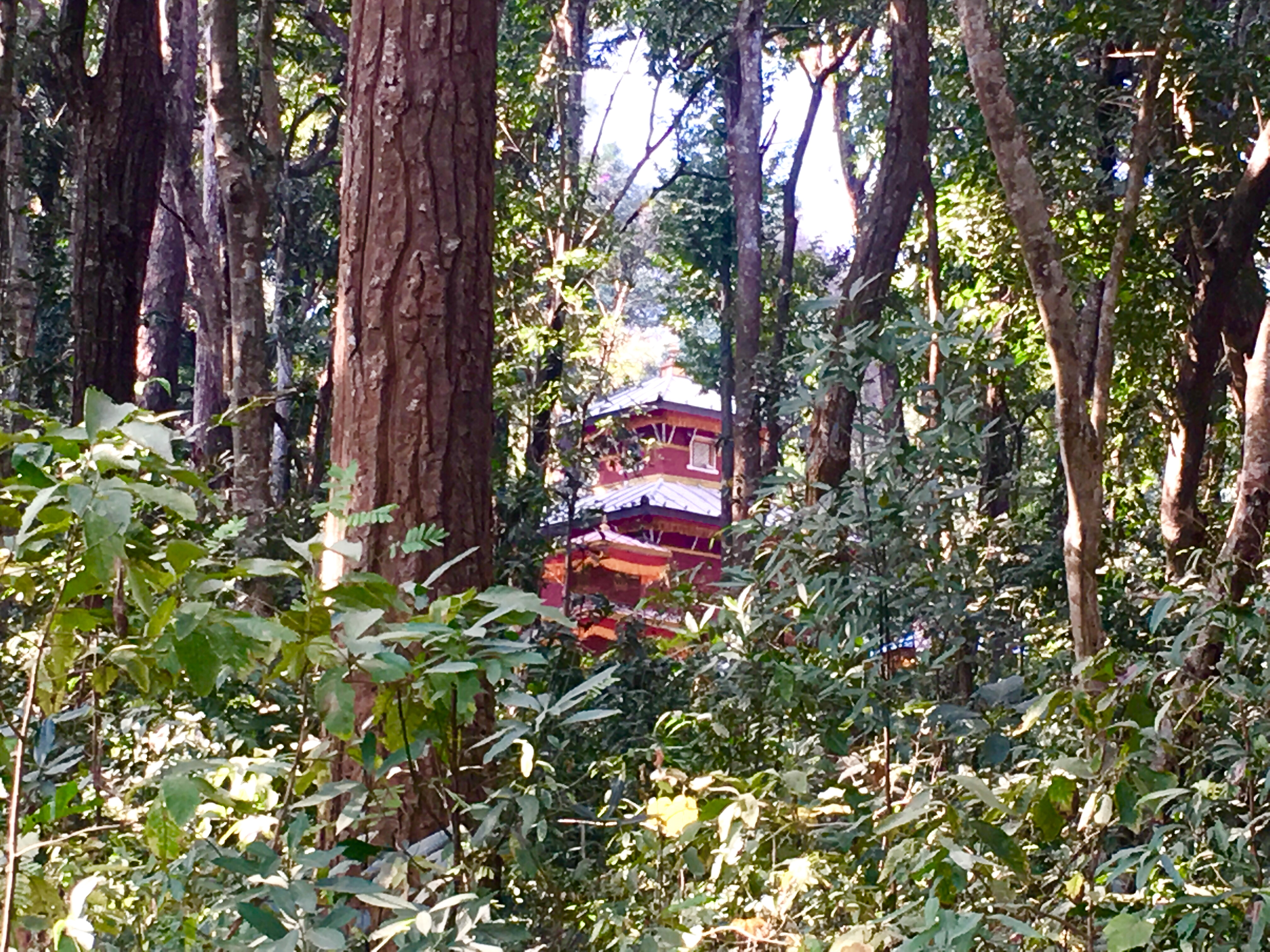
Side View of Kalika Bhagawati Temple through forest

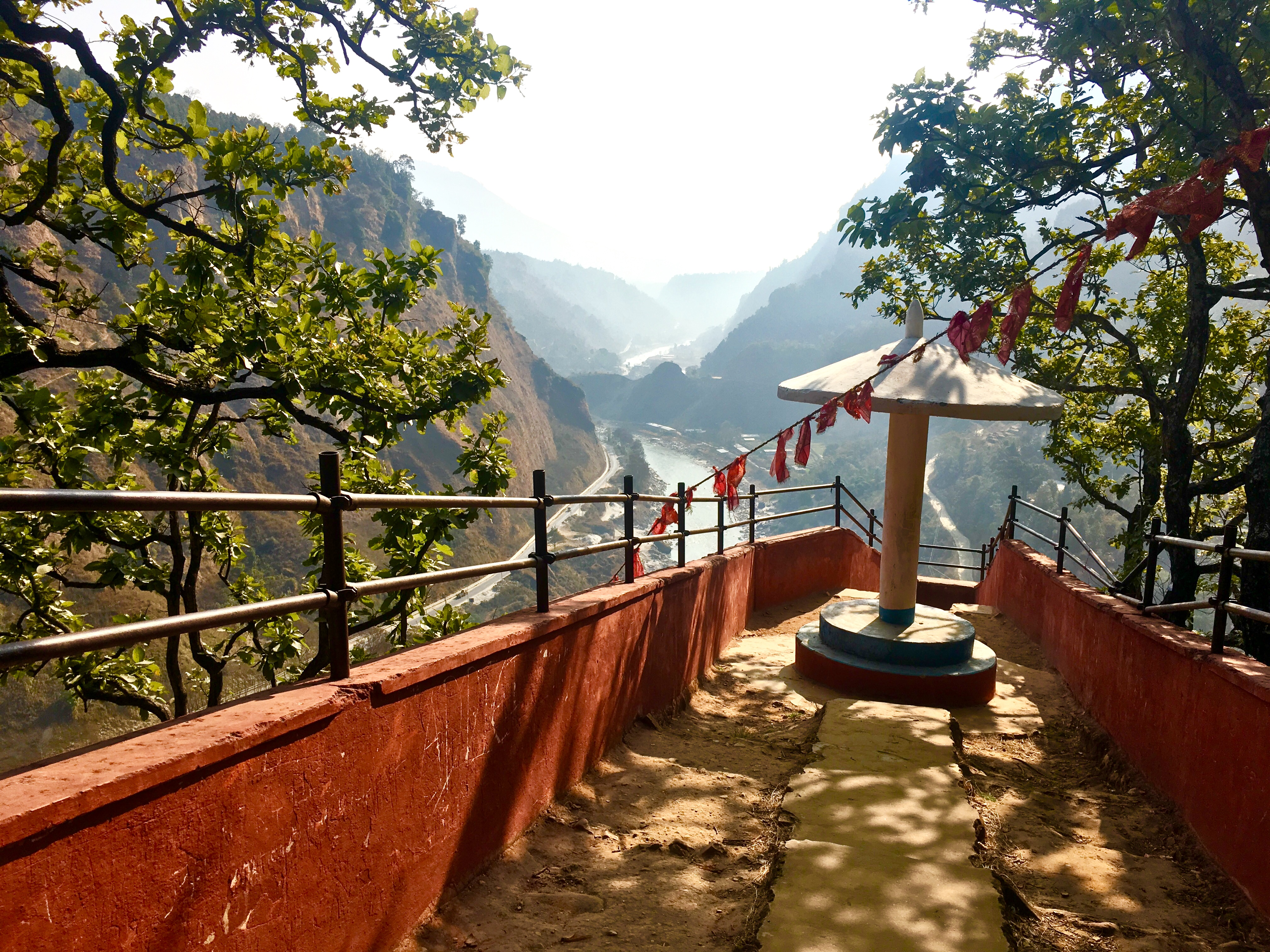
View point Located on back side of Temple
