= Lamjung Durbar =

Palace in Nepal

- लमजुङ दरबार
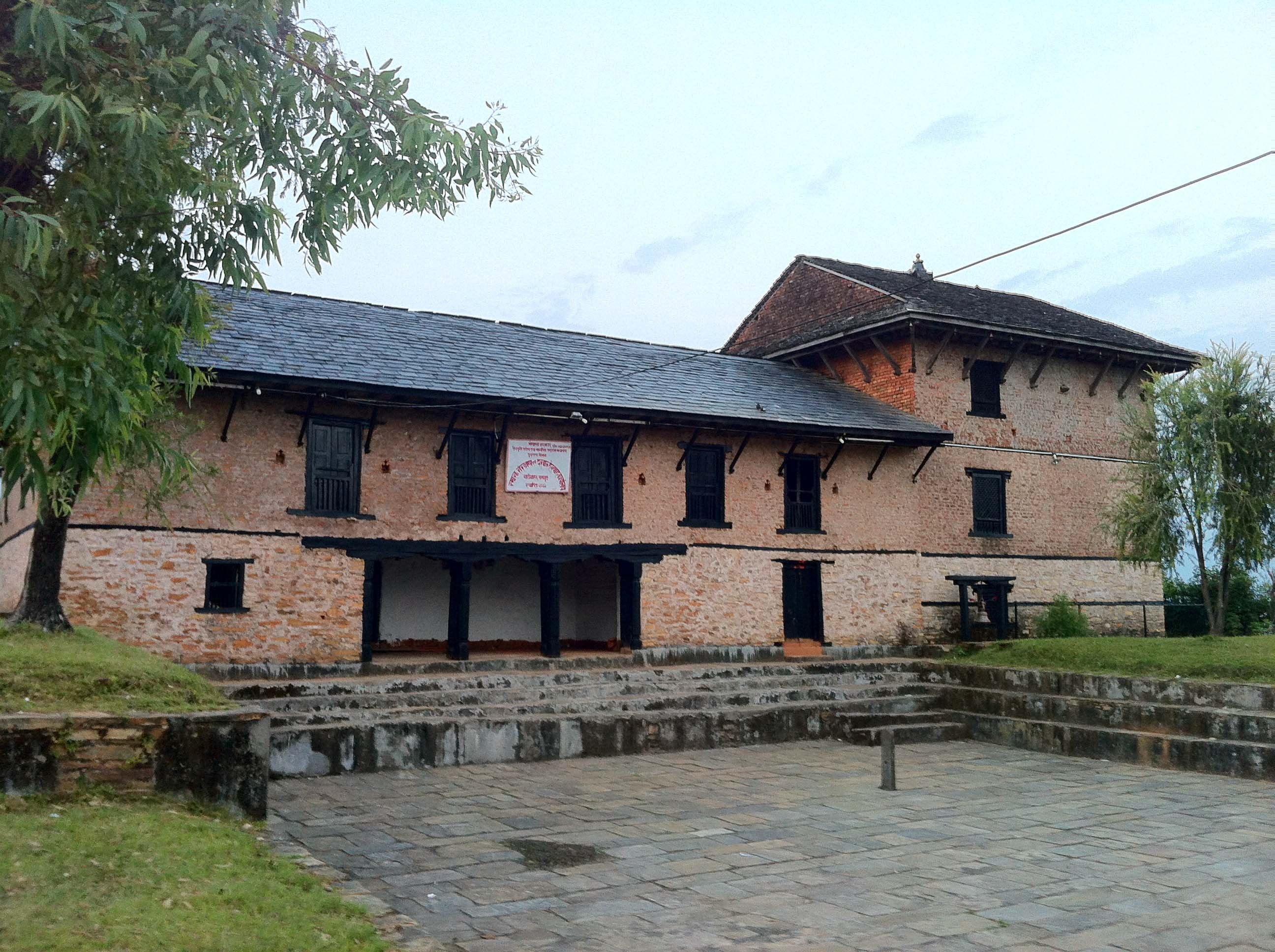
- Lamjung Durbar in 2012

- Location within Gandaki Province Location within Nepal

General information
- Location: Lamjung, Gandaki Province, Nepal
- Coordinates: 28.213151453988388°N 84.36697587197554°E

Lamjung Durbar (Nepali: लमजुङ दरबार) is a remaining part of the palace of the then King Yahobrahma Shah of Lamjung principality in 1494, at present in Lamjung District, Gandaki Province of Nepal.

It was built in the 16th century by King Yashobrahma Shah of Lamjung principality. Lamjung Durbar also acts as a fortification.

Lamjung Durbar was nationalised on 23 August 2007. In 2015, the Government of Nepal issued stamps featuring the Lamjung Durbar.
