= Invasion of Gozo (1551) =

1551 Ottoman attack on Gozo

Coordinates: 36°2′47″N 14°14′22″E

- Part of the Ottoman–Habsburg wars
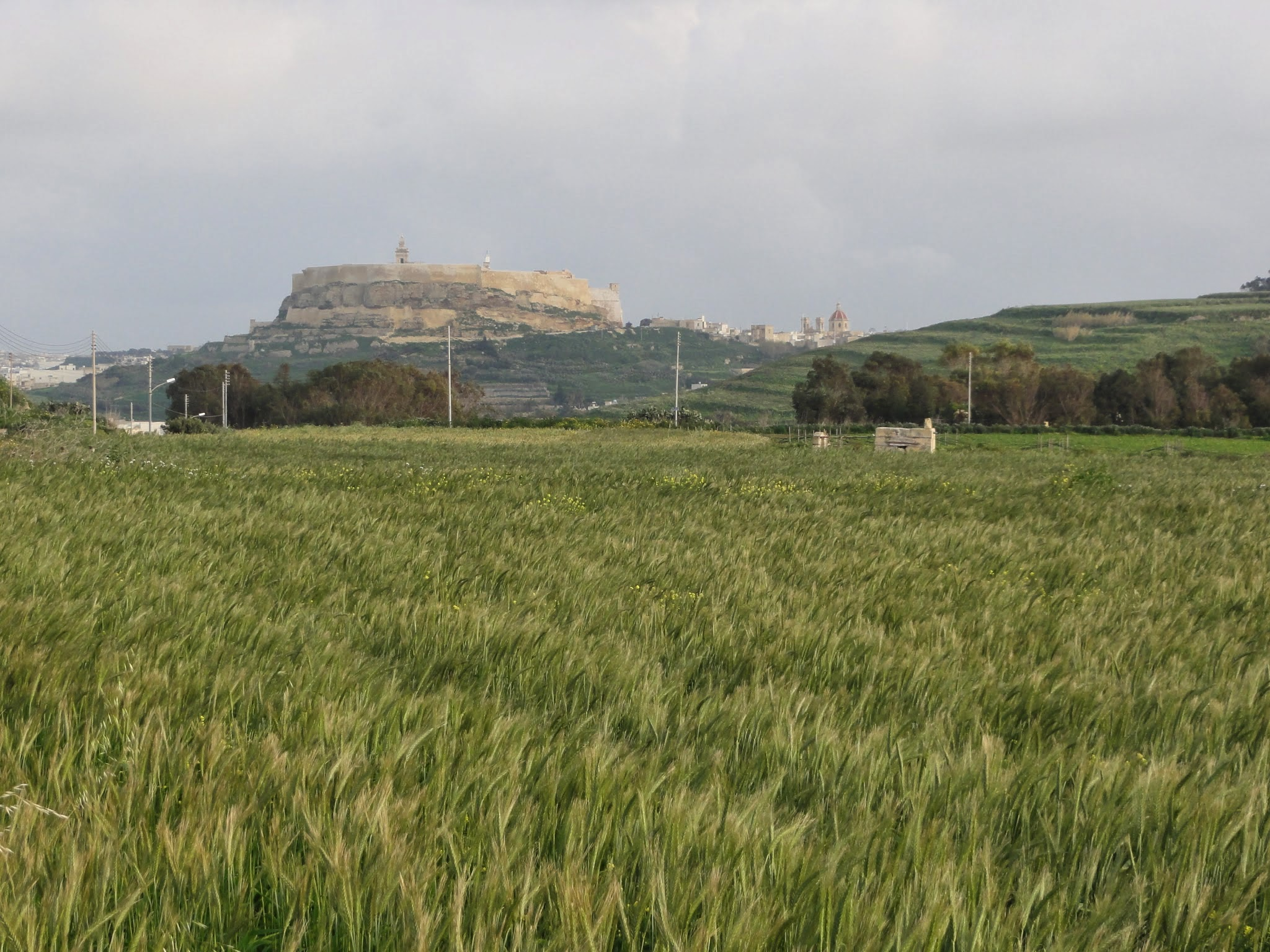
- The northern walls of the Gozo Castello – also known as the Cittadella – as photographed in 2014
Date	18–30 July 1551 (12 days)
Location	Gozo, Hospitaller Malta (following initial landing on the main island of Malta)
Result	Ottoman victory

Belligerents
Ottoman Empire	(Sovereign Military Order of Malta) Hospitaller Malta

Commanders and leaders
Sinan Pasha; Dragut; Kambil Bey; Salah Rais	On Malta: (Sovereign Military Order of Malta) Juan de Homedes (Sovereign Military Order of Malta) George Adorno; On Gozo: (Sovereign Military Order of Malta) Galatian de Sesse (surrendered)

Strength
c. 10,000–12,000 men 145 ships	On Malta: Garrisons of Birgu and Mdina; On Gozo: c. 700 men

Casualties and losses
Unknown	Several killed c. 5,000–7,000 enslaved

The invasion of Gozo, also known as the siege of Gozo (Maltese: L-Assedju t'Għawdex), was an Ottoman invasion of the island of Gozo, then part of Hospitaller Malta, in July 1551. The attack, which was led by Sinan Pasha, Dragut, Kambil Bey and Salah Rais, appears to have been launched in retaliation for the capture of Mahdia by the Spanish and Hospitallers the previous year.

The Ottoman force briefly attacked Sicily before landing on the main island of Malta on 18 July, where the city of Mdina was briefly besieged and some villages were plundered. They then abandoned Malta and landed on nearby Gozo, where the Castello was bombarded for two days before its garrison capitulated on 26 July. The fortress was sacked and between 5,000 and 7,000 people – the majority of the island's population – were enslaved and taken to North Africa or Constantinople. The same Ottoman force went on to capture Tripoli from the Hospitallers on 14 August 1551.

Some of the enslaved Gozitans were ransomed or freed, while others are known to have died in slavery or converted to Islam. Most of them never returned to the Maltese Islands, and it took about a century of resettlement for Gozo's population to recover. The Hospitallers made efforts to improve the defences of Malta after the attack; the fortifications they built later played a key role in the Great Siege of Malta of 1565.

== Background ==
Gozo's population is estimated to have stood at around 8,000 people in 1530, while according to another study the island had around 6,050 inhabitants prior to the attack. At the time, Gozitan society included a few noble families who were of Sicilian origin, while most of the population were peasant farmers known as beduini who owned small parcels of land. Like most of the population of the Maltese Islands, these were mainly descended from Siculo-Arabic-speaking Muslims who had converted to Christianity in previous centuries. Most of Gozo's population lived in one town which consisted of a medieval fortress known as the Castello and a suburb known as the Borgo (now collectively known as Victoria or Rabat). The rest of the island had been virtually abandoned as it was vulnerable to attacks by pirates or corsairs.

The Maltese Islands were subject to occasional razzias and attacks by Arabs from North Africa, and later by Barbary corsairs and the Ottoman Empire, throughout the 15th and 16th centuries. The frequency of raids by the latter increased after the Hospitallers established themselves on Malta in 1530. Gozo was particularly vulnerable to such attacks, and various sources mention raids on the island occurring in 1500, 1511, 1521, 1525, 1526, 1531, 1533, 1540, 1541, 1544, twice in 1545, 1546, 1547 and 1550. Ottoman corsair Dragut led several of these raids, including the 1540 raid in which 50 Gozitans were enslaved and the 1544 raid during which Dragut's brother was killed in the fighting; vengeance for this might have been a motivating factor for the 1551 attack.

In September 1550, the town of Mahdia in modern Tunisia – which Dragut had been using as his base – was captured by a Spanish-led expedition with Hospitaller support. This led the Ottoman sultanate to send a punitive expedition against Hospitaller Malta and Tripoli in 1551, with the capture of the latter being the primary objective. Starting in May 1551, several Hospitaller knights including Gaspard de Vallier and Nicolas Durand de Villegaignon began informing Grand Master Juan de Homedes that a large Ottoman force was being assembled in Constantinople and that Malta and Tripoli were its targets. These rumours were dismissed by Spanish and Italian knights including Homedes, who believed that the intended destination of the Ottoman fleet was Toulon. The Grand Master reportedly believed that the Ottomans were going to rendezvous with the French fleet and attack Naples.

== Attack ==
=== Prelude: attack on Sicily ===
The invading forces were led by Ottoman admiral Sinan Pasha, the corsair Dragut who acted as Sinan's lieutenant, the artillery general and army engineer Kambil Bey, and Salah Rais. Their fleet consisted of 145 ships carrying some 10,000 to 12,000 men. The fleet arrived off Messina in Sicily on 13 July 1551, and Sinan Pasha sent a letter to the Viceroy of Sicily in which he demanded that the Spanish and their allies vacate North Africa. The Ottomans briefly attempted to besiege Catania and attacked the harbour of Augusta on Sicily. The Viceroy informed the Hospitallers of this incursion and warned them that Malta and Tripoli were likely the Ottomans' next targets.

=== Initial landing on Malta ===
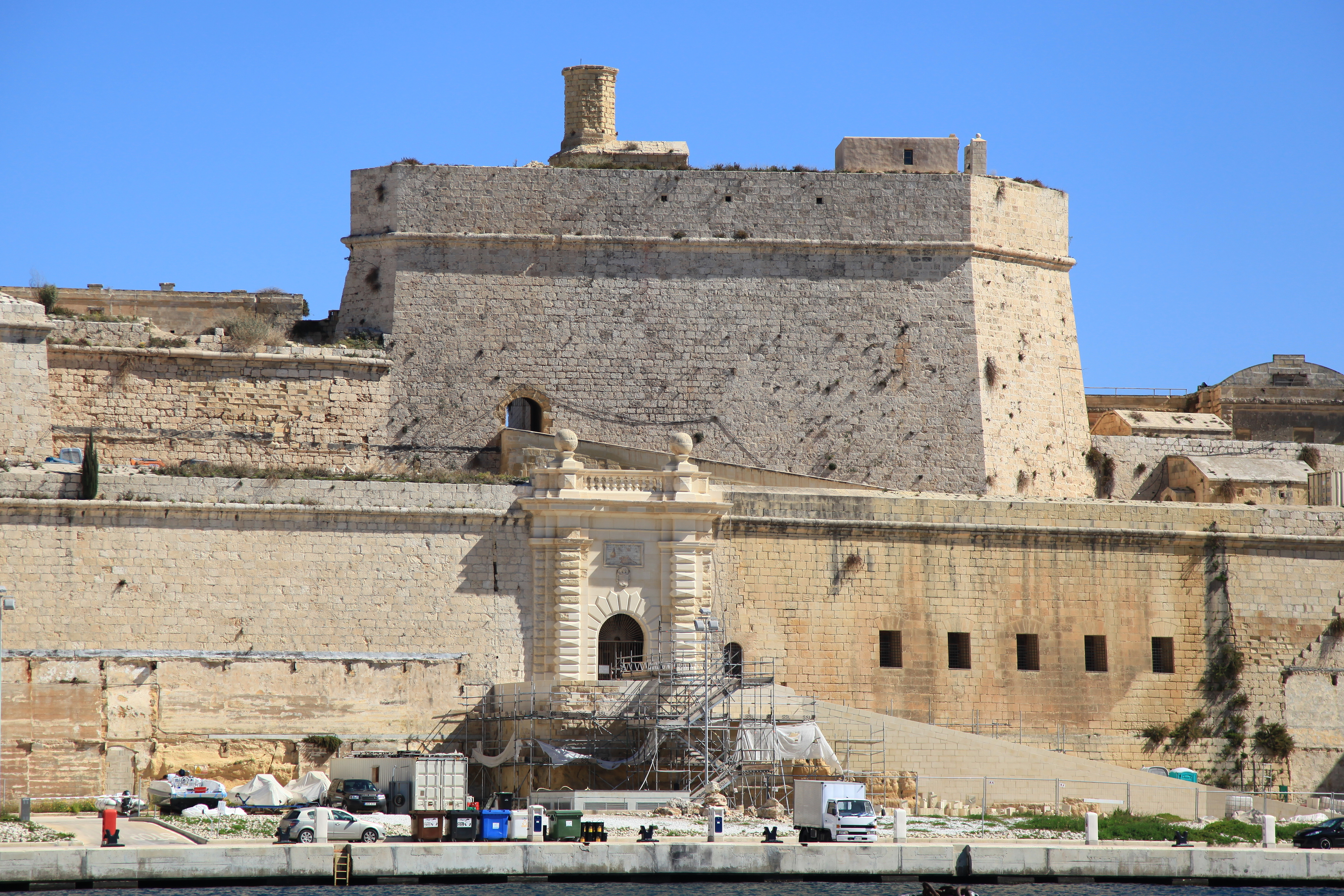
Fort St. Angelo in Birgu

On 18 July, the Ottoman fleet appeared off the main island of Malta and entered into Marsamxett Harbour. A cavalry force of 30 Hospitaller knights and 400 Maltese volunteers led by the English commander Upton and 100 knights and 300 arquebusiers on foot led by the Spanish commander De Guimeran engaged the Ottomans in an attempt to prevent them from landing on the otherwise undefended Sciberras Peninsula, but they retreated to the Hospitaller base at nearby Birgu upon seeing the invaders' numerical superiority. The Ottomans were able to land and they briefly occupied the peninsula, from where they reconnoitered Birgu and determined that the city's defences – consisting of Fort St. Angelo and newly-built fortifications – were too strong for it to be easily conquered.

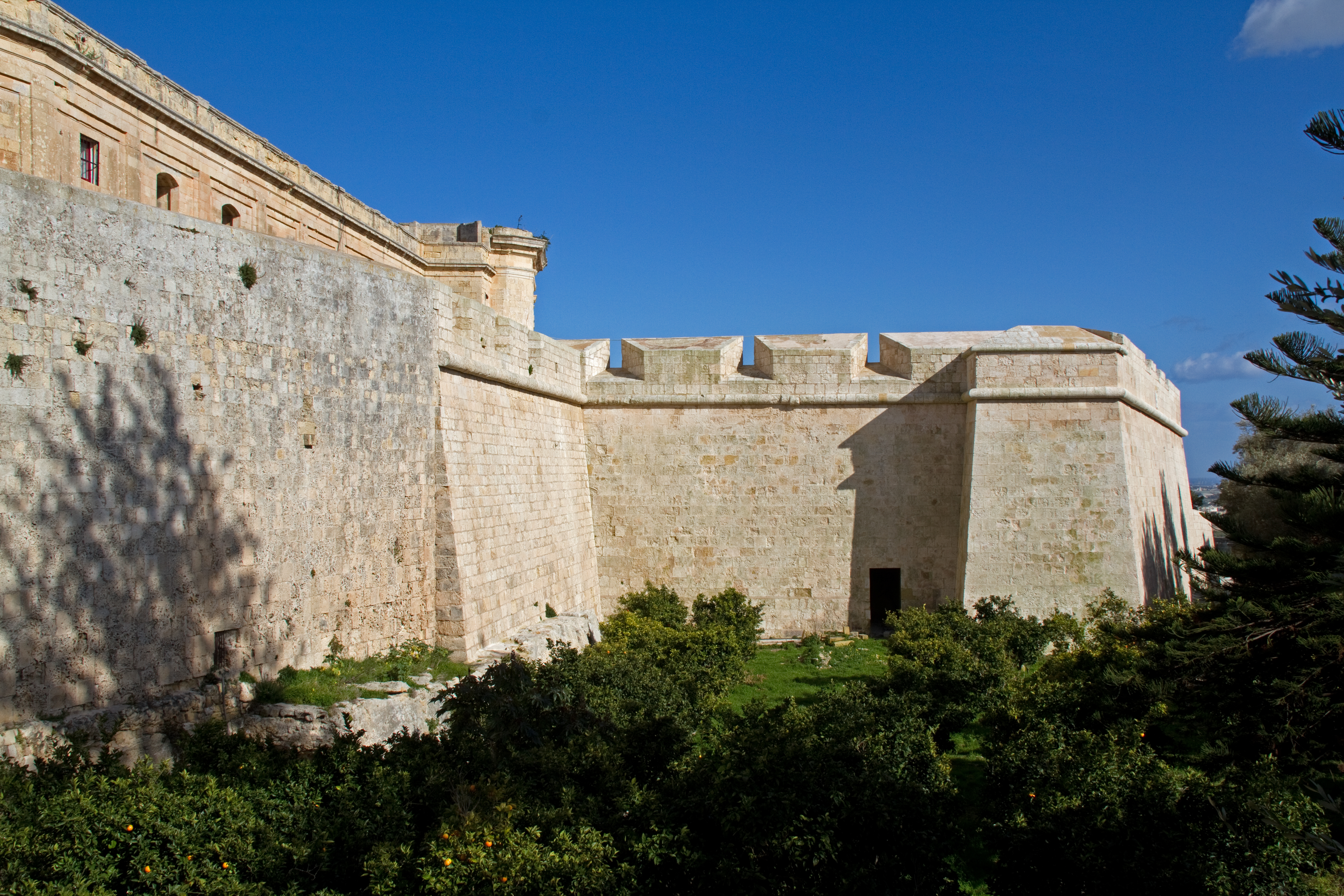
D'Homedes Bastion within the fortifications of Mdina, which has survived largely unaltered since its construction in the 1540s

The Ottomans then attacked and plundered the Maltese countryside including Birkirkara, Qormi, Naxxar, Lija, Mosta and other villages, before turning their attention to the inland city of Mdina. The city's fortifications had recently been upgraded with the addition of bastions, but its garrison was small and the city was overcrowded with thousands of Maltese peasants who had sought refuge inside. The Ottomans briefly besieged Mdina and plundered the nearby unfortified suburb of Rabat. Mdina's governor, the Genoese knight George Adorno, sent a messenger to Birgu requesting assistance from Homedes. The latter was reluctant to send a substantial number of reinforcements, but Nicolas Durand de Villegaignon and six other knights were sent and they managed to sneak past the Ottomans into the city.

Villegaignon's arrival boosted the garrison's morale, but the governor was informed that no further reinforcements would be forthcoming and the knights are said to have been ready to die. However, on 20 July, the Ottoman fleet moved to St. Paul's Bay and by the next day the invaders retreated and embarked onto their ships. The reason why the Ottomans retreated from Mdina is a matter of debate. While the city was surrounded, its inhabitants had organised a religious procession in which they placed a statue of Saint Agatha on the city walls; it is possible that when the Ottomans saw large numbers of people on the walls they may have thought that the city was manned by a large garrison and that besieging it would have cost them a lot of time. False rumours of a possible Christian relief force led by Andrea Doria arriving from Sicily might have also been a factor.

=== Attack on Gozo and sack of the Castello ===
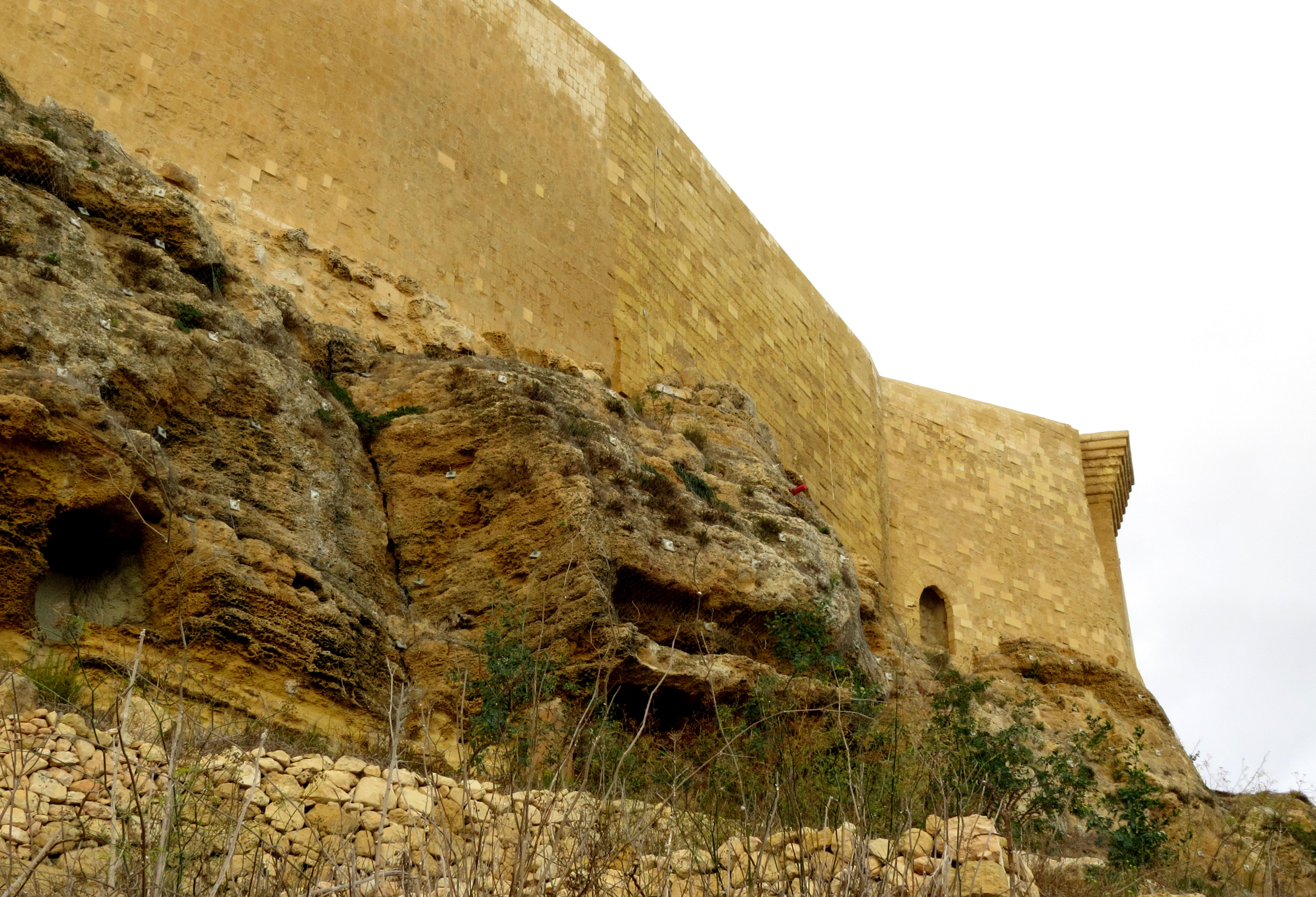
The northern walls of the Castello, which some Gozitans climbed down to escape enslavement

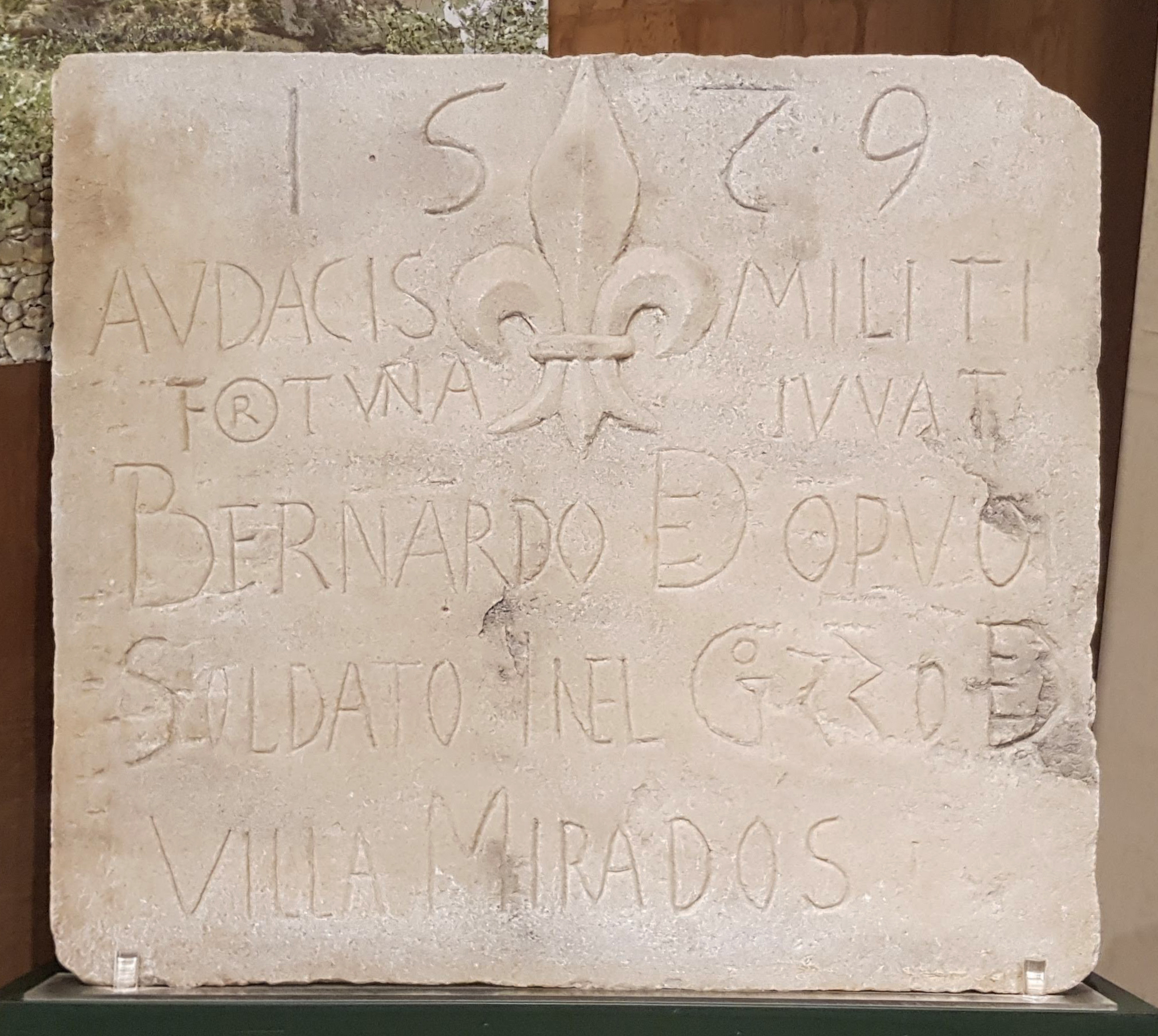
1579 plaque commemorating Bernardo de Opuo, now located at the Gozo Museum of Archaeology

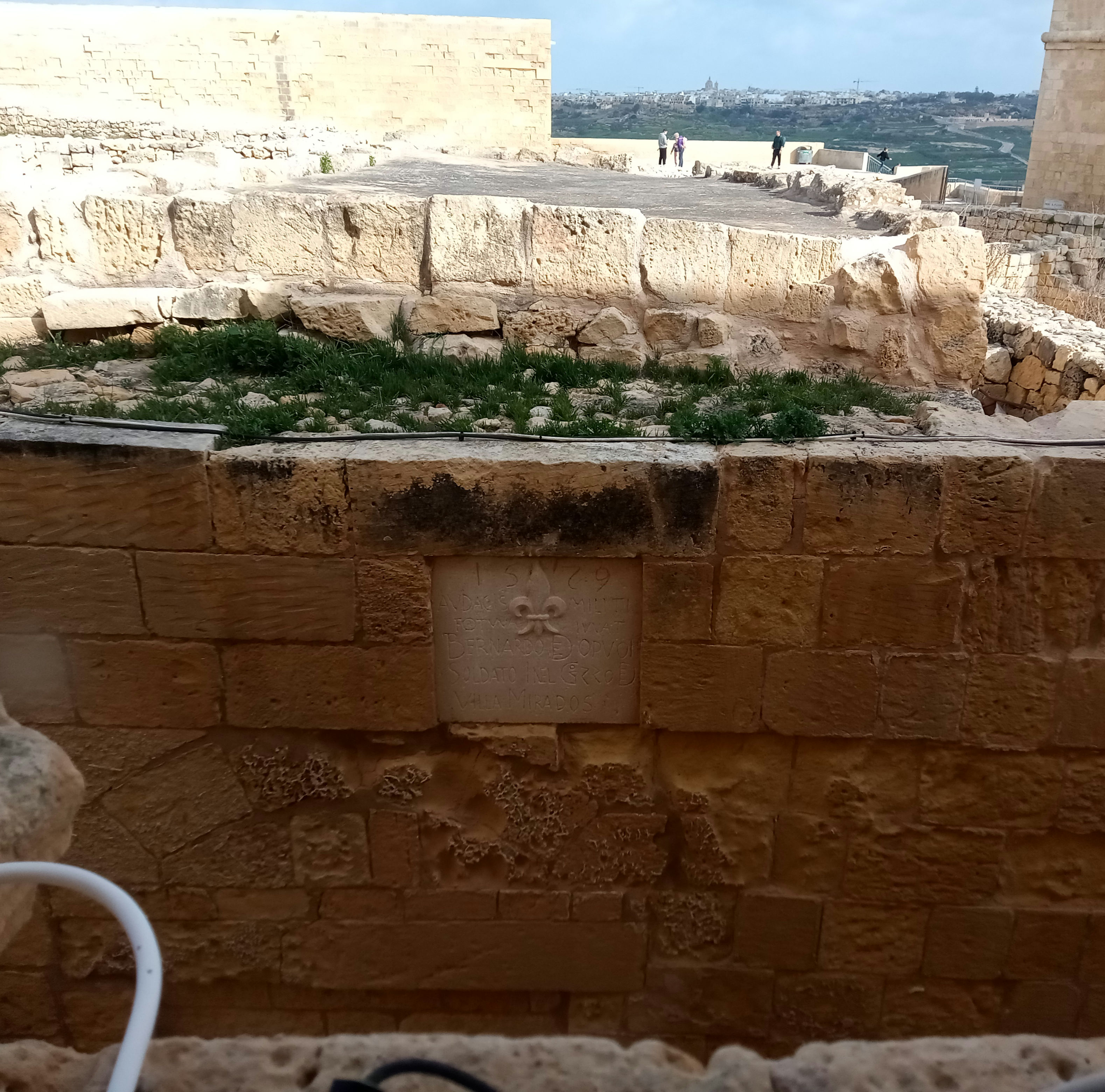
Copy of the above plaque affixed to the façade of what was possibly de Opuo's residence, which now lies in ruins

Before the attack on Gozo began, some boats carrying Gozitan women and children were reportedly sent to Malta, but Homedes is said to have refused to allow them to take refuge in Birgu and turned them back, stating that the Gozitan men would be motivated to fight harder if they had their women and children with them.

The Ottomans landed on Gozo on 22 July. The Castello was under the command of the knight Galatian de Sesse, who had been appointed as Governor of Gozo earlier that year. Its defences were obsolete and it had only a small garrison, but as had been the case with Mdina, the fortress was full of people as Gozo's population sought refuge within its walls.

De Sesse sent the jurat Paolo di Nasis to request help from Malta, and Homedes sent a boat loaded with gunpowder and arquebuses but this never arrived as it was captured by the Ottoman fleet while on its way to Gozo. Several soldiers and bombardiers were also captured along with di Nasis, and only a single English bombardier was left on duty inside the Castello. Di Nasis falsely claimed that Gozo was well-defended when interrogated by the Ottomans, but Dragut was already aware of the poor state of the island's defences and he persuaded Sinan Pasha to launch the attack.

At around midnight on 23 July, some Gozitans escaped from the Castello by climbing down ropes along its northern walls. Historian Giacomo Bosio stated that some 300 managed to escape in this manner, but later historians have estimated that the number might have been around 500 to 700 people, most of whom were likely able-bodied men.

According to Bosio, Sinan Pasha deployed artillery near the Porta Reale and the parish church of St George, and the Castello began to be bombarded on Friday 24 July. The lone English bombardier was one of the early casualties of the attack. De Sesse convened a council meeting with Gozo's elites, and they decided to seek a truce with the invaders on the condition that 200 of the wealthier citizens be spared and allowed to keep their possessions. An Augustinian monk, Bartolomeo Bonavia, was sent as an emissary to negotiate with Sinan Pasha, but the latter only agreed to spare 40 people as he knew that the castle was about to fall.

On Sunday 26 July, after two days of bombardment, de Sesse and the Gozitan elite decided to accept Sinan Pasha's terms and the Castello's gate was opened. The Ottomans rushed in and proceeded to sack the fortress, burning down the Matrice church and the archives and rounding up its inhabitants. Sinan Pasha decided to spare 40 elderly men instead of 40 elites. Bonavia convinced the Ottomans to also spare one woman who was about to give birth, and he himself was also spared as it was customary to not harm any emissaries.

The remaining people inside the Castello – around 700 soldiers and a few thousand inhabitants including women and children – were captured and enslaved. Sources disagree on the exact number: Bosio stated that 5,000 were enslaved, de Nicolay gave a figure of 6,300, while de Soldanis gave a figure of 6,000 to 7,000. This constituted the majority of the island's population, and Gozo's elites including many members of the Università Gaudisii (the island's governing body) and some Hospitaller knights including de Sesse were among the captives. One Sicilian soldier, Bernardo de Opuo, is said to have killed his wife and two daughters in order to spare them from being raped and enslaved. He then killed two Turks before he himself was killed in the fighting.

After the Castello was taken, the rest of the island was also plundered, other churches were burnt, and the captives were embarked onto the Ottoman fleet which departed Gozo on 30 July, heading towards North Africa.

== Aftermath ==
=== Siege of Tripoli ===
After leaving Gozo, the Ottoman fleet proceeded to North Africa and landed at Zuwarah and Tajura in the vicinity of Hospitaller Tripoli. The Ottomans besieged the city and captured it on 14 August 1551. Unlike the garrison on Gozo, the Hospitaller knights in Tripoli managed to negotiate safe passage to Malta for themselves, but the rest of the city's garrison was also enslaved or massacred. One source claims that de Sesse was allowed to return to Malta along with the knights from Tripoli, but this is contradicted by other sources.

=== Fate of captives ===
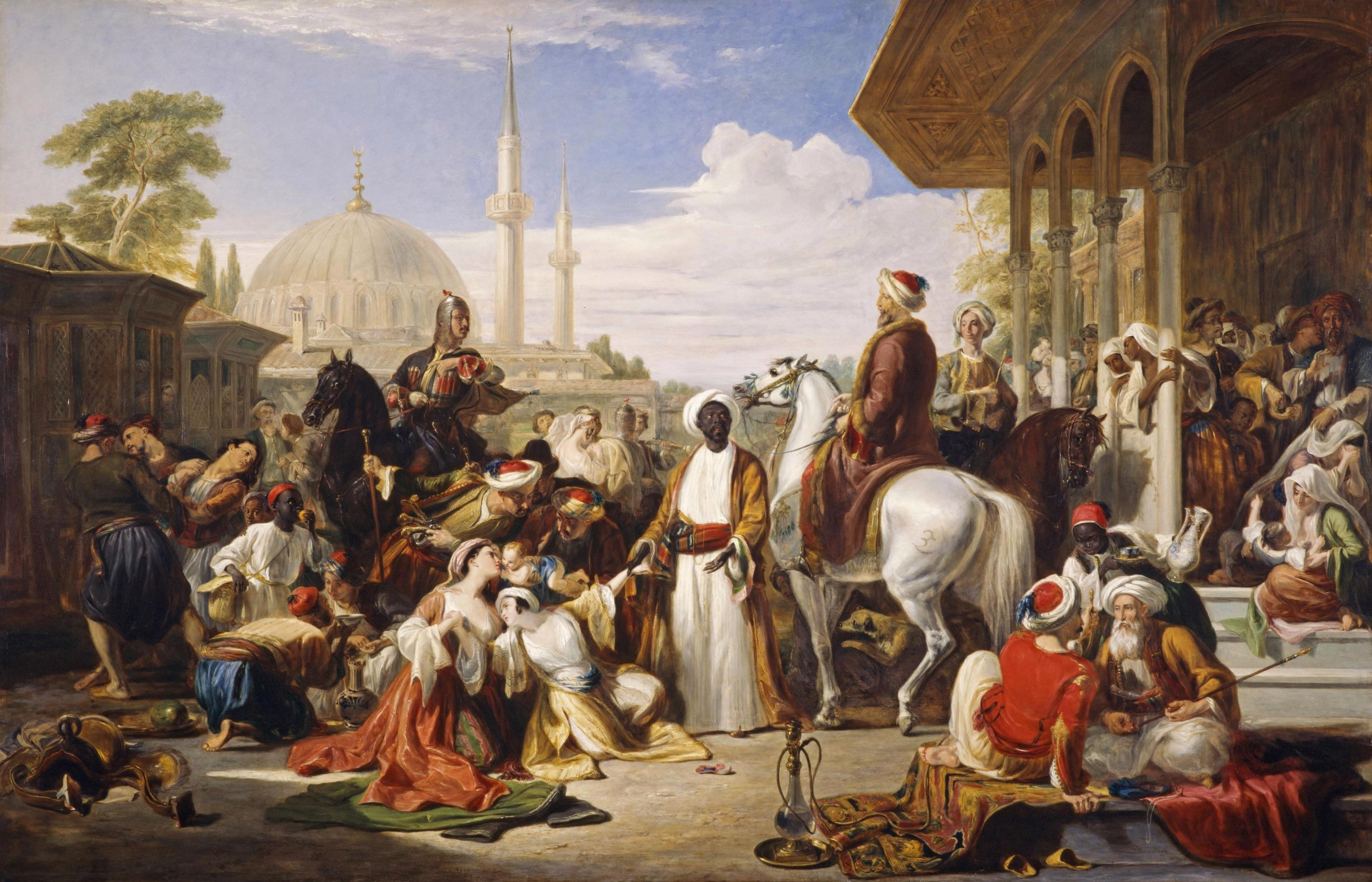
A 19th-century depiction of a slave market in Constantinople, as painted by William Allan

Some of the enslaved Gozitans remained in North Africa, and there are records of some being sold in Tajura, as evidenced by witness testimony in a court case concerning a Gozitan woman who was purchased there by a Turk before being taken to Tripoli, where she became his concubine and later his wife after converting to Islam. According to tradition, some enslaved Gozitans were taken to Tarhuna in modern Libya, where they and their descendants converted to Islam and assimilated into the local population. Some reportedly maintained memory of their Maltese ancestry until as late as World War II: J. Manara, a Maltese who lived in Tripoli, claimed to have heard a resident of Tarhuna state "Siamo Maltesi della vendetta di Dragut" (Italian for "we are Maltese of Dragut's revenge").

After the capture of Tripoli, the majority of the slaves were taken to Constantinople. Many of the adult men – including the former governor de Sesse – are believed to have ended up as galley slaves. A number of surviving court cases and other records from the 1550s and 1560s make reference to Gozitan slaves in the Ottoman capital, including some who were eventually freed or ransomed, some who converted to Islam, and others who died in slavery. It is believed that the majority never returned to the Maltese Islands, while some of those who did manage to obtain their freedom decided not to return to Gozo and instead settled on the main island of Malta (especially within the urban area around the Grand Harbour) or moved to Sicily.

On 10 October 1551, Pope Julius III granted an indulgence to those who contributed funds to ransom the Gozitans. The archives of the Mdina cathedral indicate that in the years after the attack, the Church in Malta collected money in order to ransom some of the slaves, but it did not manage to raise sufficient funds to secure the release of a substantial number of captives. There are records of some richer Gozitans being ransomed shortly after their capture, including priest and notary Lorenzo de Apapis who returned to Malta by October 1553. As the parish priest of Gozo's St George parish, de Apapis became one of the leaders of the surviving community on Gozo in the years after the attack. Nicolò Castelletti, the parish priest of the Matrice church, died in slavery by 1553; it is possible that he was on his way back to Gozo but he died before he was able to return.

De Sesse was eventually also ransomed and he returned to Malta in 1556, but he was subsequently imprisoned by the Hospitallers as he was accused of betraying the Order by surrendering Gozo. The charges against him were eventually dropped after his conduct was deemed to have been reasonable considering the superiority of the enemy forces, and he was released by Claude de la Sengle on 14 August 1557.

An analysis of Gozitan surnames mentioned in surviving records has revealed that many pre-1551 surnames resurfaced on the island by the late 16th century, but there are some surnames which are only attested to in pre-1551 sources and which never appear in later Gozitan or Maltese sources – namely Agueina, Aluisa, Calimera, Cianba, Gerardu, Giarda, Lazu, Lazarun, Marinara, Xaura, Xluc and Xucula. This suggests that people from these families lived out their lives as slaves and never returned to the Maltese Islands.

=== Resettlement of Gozo ===
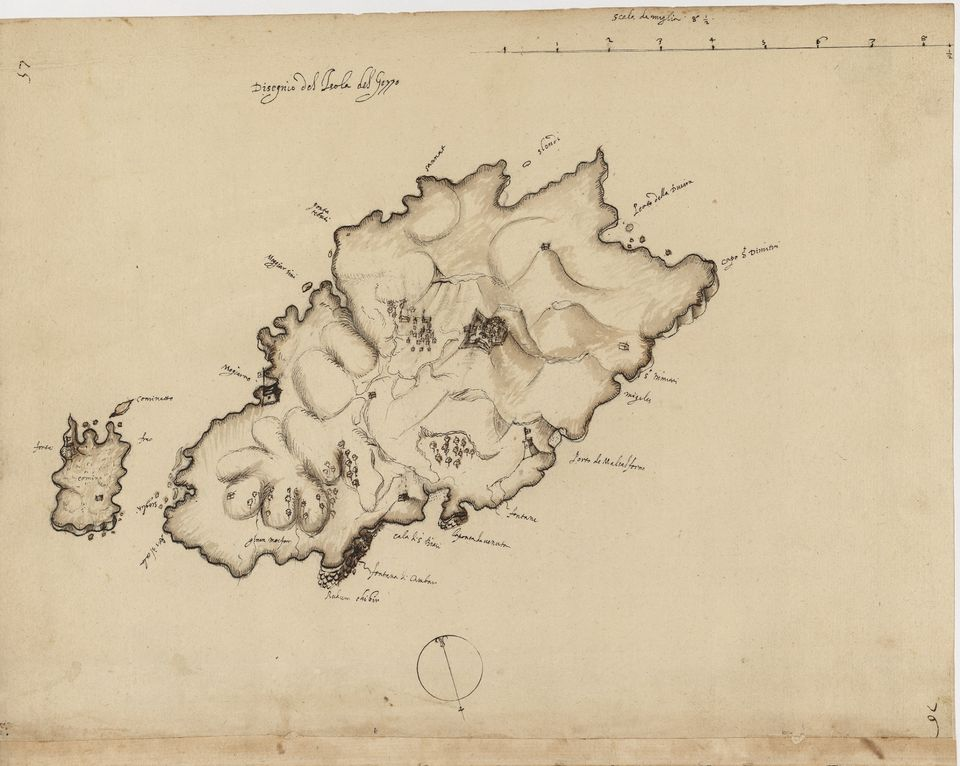
17th-century map of Gozo and Comino

Shortly after the Ottomans left Gozo, the Hospitallers sent their fleet to the island where they salvaged some munitions and ferried its few remaining inhabitants to Malta. The knight Pietro Olivares was appointed as Governor of Gozo in 1553, and the Gozitans who had avoided capture and some of those who were ransomed later returned to the island. The existence of notarial records from Gozo dated 1553 and baptismal records and lawsuits dated 1554 indicate that some degree of normality returned to the island a couple of years after the attack. Some of the Gozitans who were in captivity retained title to their lands in Gozo through procurators who administered their estates on their behalf, while some who managed to return found that their lands had been encroached on by Maltese workers. There are records of a number of legal disputes relating to ownership of property left behind by those who had been killed or enslaved during the attack, and some of these lasted until the late 16th century.

Two of Gozo's four parishes – the Matrice and the parish of St George – were revived in the years after the attack, while the parishes of St James and St Mary (ta' Savina) were not.

In the first few years after the attack there was a shortage of women on the island, as the majority of the Gozitans who had avoided capture had been men, and their numbers were bolstered by soldiers the Hospitallers sent to garrison the Castello after the attack. Prior to 1551 Gozo had produced a surplus of agricultural products which were sold in Malta; since most of those enslaved had been farmers, there were few people to work the land after the attack and Malta had to increase its imports from Sicily as a result.

Gozo remained depopulated until it was resettled by Maltese and some Sicilians in a gradual process which took decades. Resettlement seems to have peaked in around 1580, but it took around a century for the island's population to reach pre-1551 levels. Many of the Maltese settlers on Gozo originated from rural areas on the main island, including Naxxar, Mosta and Għargħur in the north, Żebbuġ and Siġġiewi in the centre, and Żurrieq, Safi and Qrendi in the south. Apart from Maltese and Sicilians, there are also records of some settlers from mainland Italy, including Naples and Verona.

Some of the commonest surnames on Gozo as of the early 21st century – including Attard, Camilleri, Portelli, Azzopardi and Spiteri – are not mentioned in any pre-1551 Gozitan records, and they are believed to have been introduced to the island by Maltese settlers following the 1551 attack. Another common Gozitan surname, Sultana, is first attested to in relation to a Sicilian who settled on the island in 1569.

=== Efforts to improve defences ===
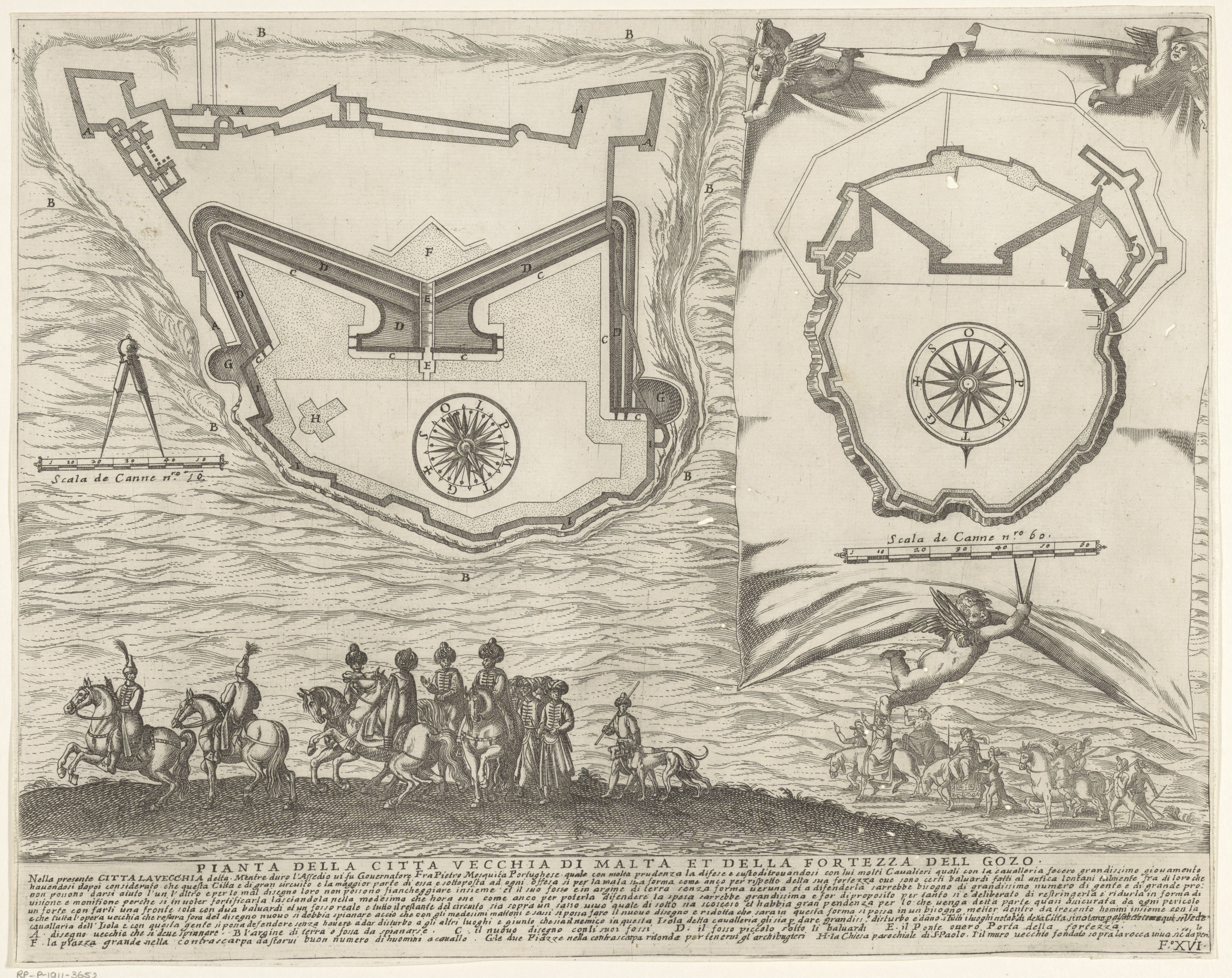
Plans of proposals to modernize Mdina (left) and the Gozo Castello (right); although neither of these exact proposals were implemented, both fortresses were later upgraded between the 16th and 18th centuries.

With the sacking of Gozo and the loss of Tripoli in quick succession, the Hospitallers anticipated that another Ottoman attack on Malta would take place in the sailing season of 1552. Grand Master de Homedes evacuated non-combatants to Syracuse and Licata in Sicily, and the Order's Council decided to focus its efforts on improving the fortifications of Malta in case of another attack.

Viceroy of Sicily Juan de Vega sent the military engineer Pietro Prado to Malta, and in January 1552 the latter reviewed the island's defences together with a commission of Hospitaller knights. It was decided to hastily build two new fortresses at strategic points around the Grand Harbour on the main island: Fort Saint Elmo at the tip of the Sciberras peninsula and Fort Saint Michael at the landward side of the Isola peninsula. Existing fortifications including Fort Saint Angelo were also strengthened. Although the anticipated 1552 attack did not materialise, these forts later played a key role in the Great Siege of Malta in 1565, in which Dragut was killed in action during an attack on Fort Saint Elmo. Although the damage that the Castello of Gozo had sustained in 1551 was repaired by the 1560s, and all debris from the attack were cleared by 1568, no efforts were made to modernise it in the years after the attack, largely due to a lack of funds and because the Order focused its efforts on building fortifications around the Grand Harbour and on its navy.

Gozo continued to be subjected to raids for decades after 1551, with sources mentioning attacks occurring in 1560, 1561, 1563, 1570, 1572, 1574, 1582, 1583, 1588, 1597, 1598 and 1599. Dragut was again involved in the raid of 1561, which was repelled following a skirmish with Gozitan cavalry. During a raid in 1582 or 1583, (Note: Some sources claim this raid occurred in 1582, but archival sources at the National Library of Malta state that it occurred on 18 October 1583.) Rabat was sacked and 70 people were taken as slaves by corsairs from Bizerte. This vulnerability created a general sense of insecurity which prevented the development of villages on Gozo until the late 17th century; prior to that point the Gozitan population remained concentrated within and around the Castello, and the countryside beyond featured only some small farms and country houses. The military engineer Francesco Laparelli visited Gozo in 1567 and probably made a proposal to improve its defences, but this was not implemented. Works to upgrade the Castello began in 1599, and by 1622 its southern walls had been completely rebuilt as a bastioned enceinte. Gozitan women and children were required by law to sleep within the Castello until 1637. Further efforts to improve Gozo's defences were made throughout the 17th century with the construction of a network of coastal watchtowers. The first to be built were large towers at Mġarr, Marsalforn and on the small island of Comino in the 1600s and 1610s, followed by a series of smaller towers at Xlendi, Dwejra, Mġarr ix-Xini and Daħlet Qorrot in the 1650s and 1660s. A series of coastal batteries, redoubts and entrenchments along with Fort Chambray were added in the 18th century.

== Legacy ==
=== Sources and analysis ===
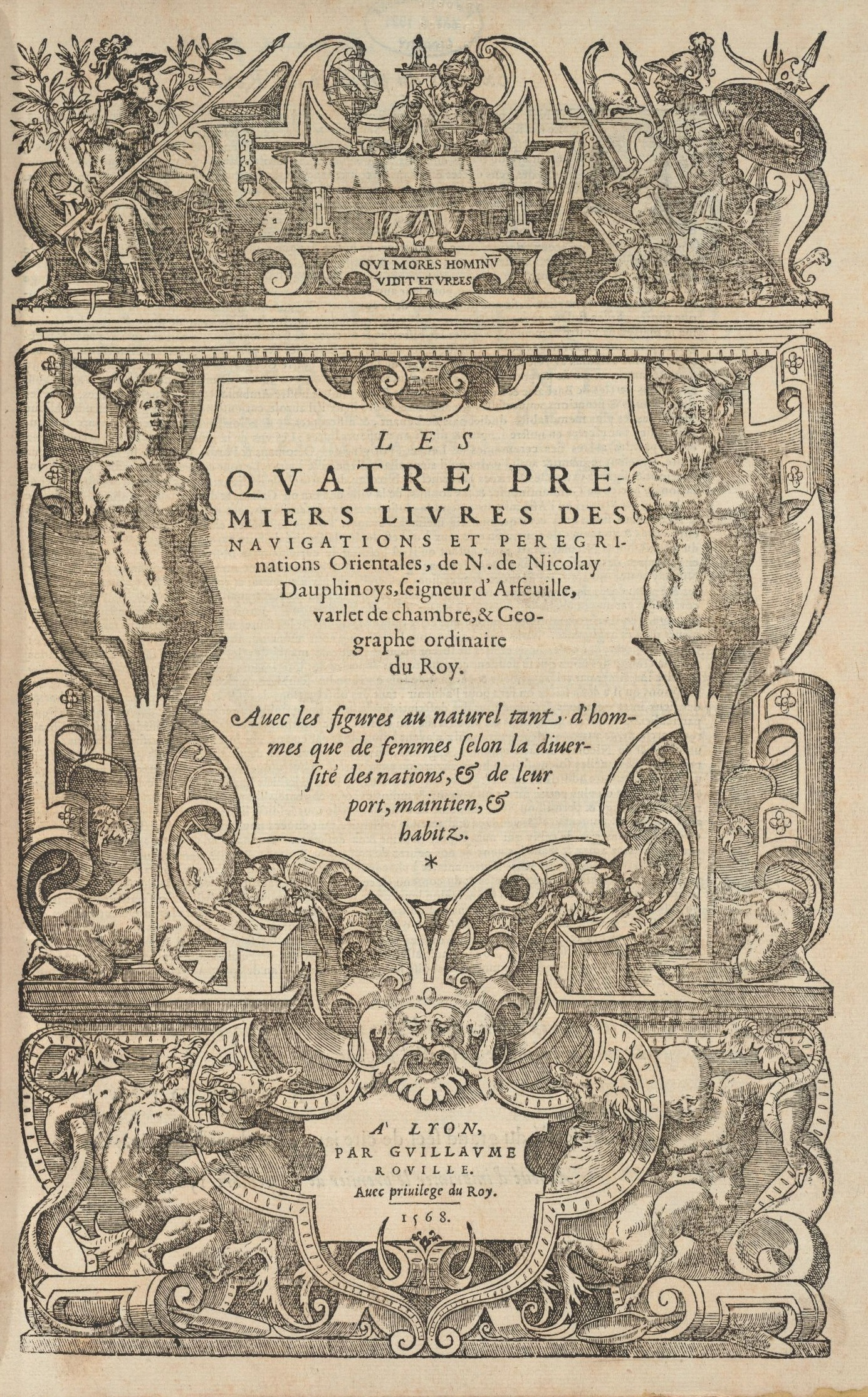
Les quatre premiers livres des navigations et peregrinations orientales by Nicolas de Nicolay (1568)

Early accounts of the events of July 1551 include De bello Melitensi by Nicolas Durand de Villegaignon which was published in Paris in 1553 and Les quatre premiers livres des navigations et peregrinations orientales by Nicolas de Nicolay which was published in Lyon in 1568. Villegaignon was present in Malta during the attack and had played a role in the defence of Mdina, while de Nicolay was an eyewitness of its immediate aftermath, having been present in Malta and Tripoli in August 1551. The attack is also described in de Nicolay's 1576 book Les navigations peregrinations et voyages, faicts en la Turquie. Later accounts of the attack are found in the works of Hospitaller historian Giacomo Bosio and 18th-century Gozitan historian Giovanni Pietro Francesco Agius de Soldanis. In the 20th and 21st centuries, further research about the attack and its aftermath was carried out by Stanley Fiorini and Joseph Bezzina; the latter published the first book dedicated exclusively to the attack in 2021.

The invasion resulted in "the dispersal and destruction of most of the community on the island." It has been described in some sources as "Gozo's holocaust" due to the devastating and lasting impact it had on the island's demographics, economy and culture, although some authors have challenged this label and described it as over the top since the Ottomans' motivations were to enslave rather than kill the Gozitan population. There has been some debate on whether the events of July 1551 are best described as an "attack" or a "siege"; some authors prefer the former term as the latter implies a more protracted military engagement.

=== Loss of historical records ===
Most paper records which existed on Gozo prior to 1551 were lost or destroyed during the attack. De Soldanis wrote in the 18th century that the Ottomans "[burnt] all archives and documents they could find. They saved some documents and carried them to Constantinople where they remain to the present day."

Although there are claims that some saw these looted documents in Constantinople during the 19th century, the relocation of Gozitan records to the Ottoman capital has not been verified, and several attempts by the British colonial government of Malta to retrieve them were unsuccessful. Following an 1848 petition by Baron Giuseppe Maria Depiro, Governor Richard More O'Ferrall requested the colonial secretary Earl Grey to assist him in locating any surviving Gozitan records in Constantinople. In 1849 the Earl wrote to O'Ferrall that following enquiries made by the British ambassador, "it appears that no such documents as those supposed to have been taken from the island of Gozo in the year 1551 are in existence in that capital."

Lewis Mizzi, a Maltese lawyer who lived in Constantinople in the late 19th century, was later tasked with finding these documents by secretary Henry Houlton, but his two-decade-long search proved to be unsuccessful. Governor Francis Grenfell raised the matter again in 1900 with the assistance of historian Alfredo Mifsud; the latter claimed that it was possible that some of the archives may have ended up in Palermo rather than Constantinople as some Ottoman ships were reportedly captured by French ships and were taken to Sicily shortly after the 1551 attack. Mifsud also wrote that "having regard to the way in which books and documents were and are preserved in the Turkish capital, even if these archives were really taken to Constantinople they must, by this time, have become quite unreadable and therefore of little value."

Some of the few surviving pre-1551 notarial records from Gozo are now preserved at the Notarial Archives in Valletta; it is possible that at least some of these had indeed been taken to Constantinople but were returned to Malta via France. The Palermo archives reportedly also still contain some Gozitan records.

=== Folklore and legends ===
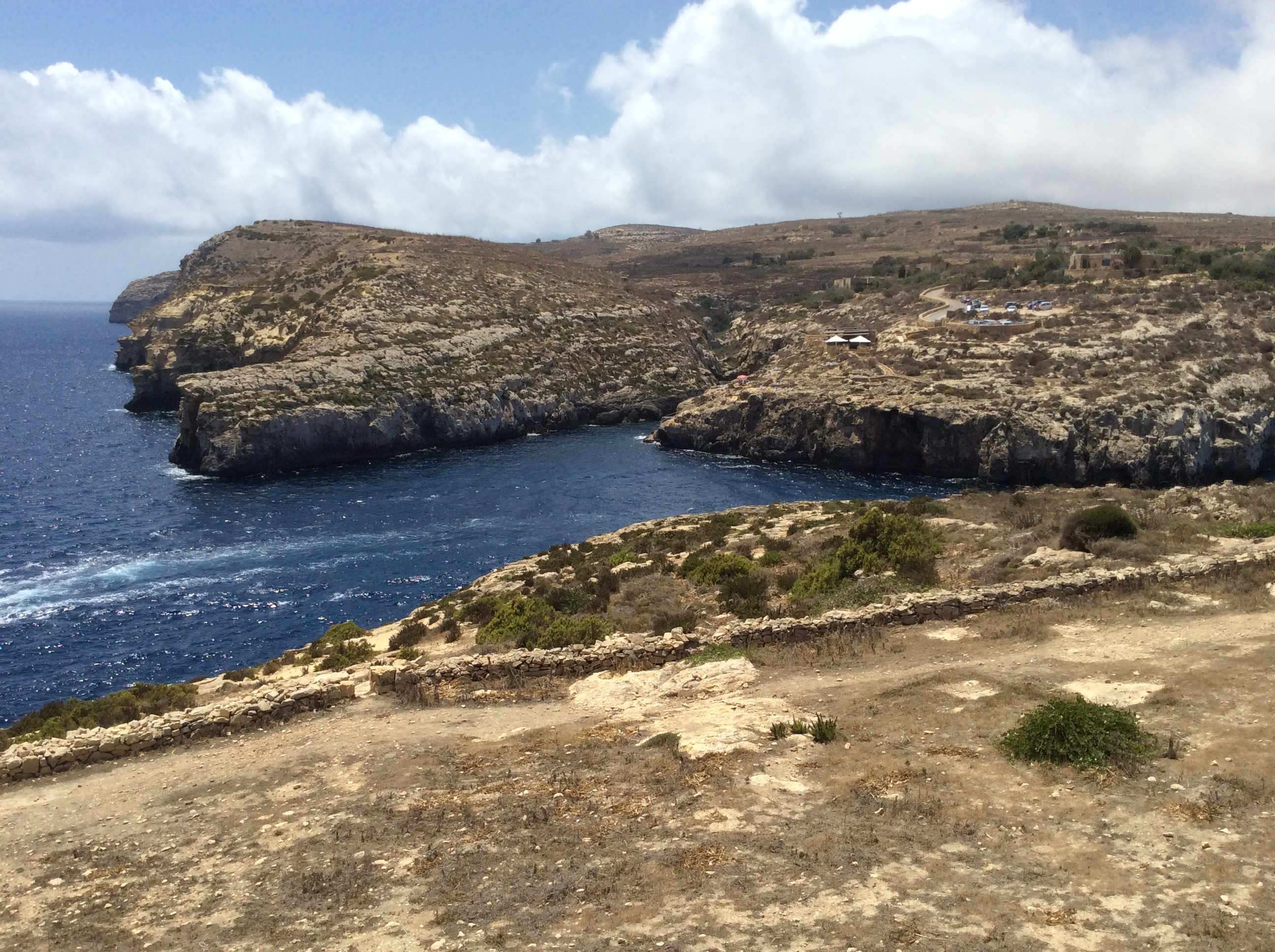
View of Mġarr ix-Xini with Newwiela Point visible in the background at left; according to tradition the Gozitan captives were loaded onto Ottoman ships from this location

The events of July 1551 are referenced in Maltese folklore. The fact that poorly-defended Mdina managed to hold out was attributed by some to divine intervention; similar legends had previously arisen from an earlier siege of the city in 1429.

According to tradition, the 1551 attack was Dragut's revenge against the Gozitans after his brother had been killed during a previous raid on the island in 1544, in which the Gozitans are said to have burnt his body instead of allowing him a proper burial. An islet off Gozo which is known as Ħalfa Rock is said to have been the place where Dragut swore an oath (Maltese: ħalfa) of revenge against the people of Gozo.

Several other places are associated with the 1551 attack, including an area known as Misraħ it-Torok or il-Misraħ tat-Torok located between Gelmus and Għasri which is said to have been the site of an Ottoman camp, and Newwiela Point near Mġarr ix-Xini from where the Gozitans are said to have embarked onto the Ottoman ships. The latter is said to have got its name from the invaders' cries of "Newwel, newwel, erġa newwel" (a phrase meaning "Hand [them] over" in Maltese or Arabic) as they were loading the captives. Newwiela Point is a promontory with high inaccessible cliffs so it is unlikely that this tradition is true, and the place name probably predates 1551.

Bernardo de Opuo also came to be seen as a legendary and heroic figure. There are also legends related to buried treasure including precious objects from the Matrice church and a bell from Żebbuġ which were supposedly hidden by Gozitans prior to the attack but which were never recovered.

=== Monuments and memorials ===
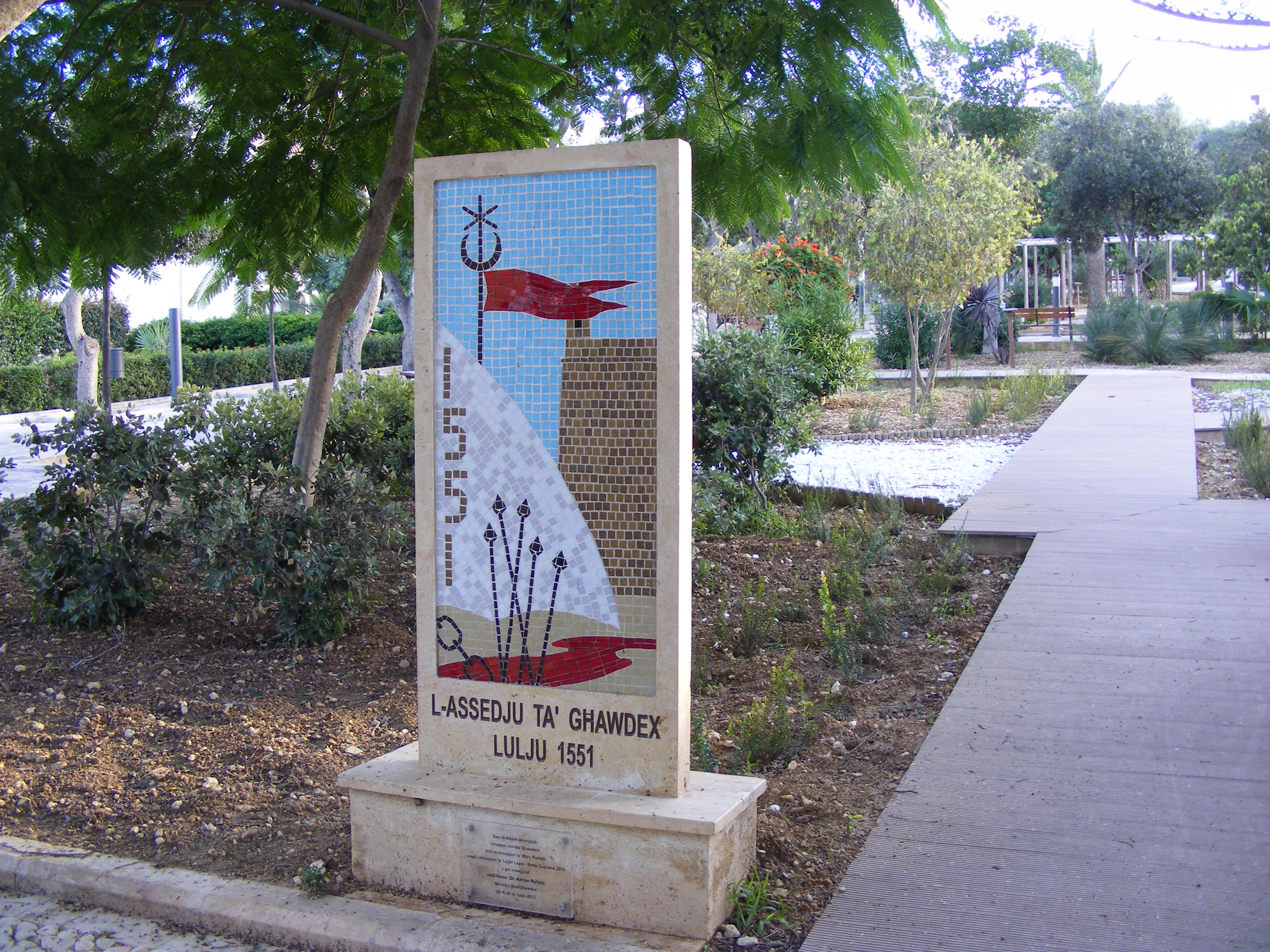
Memorial at Villa Rundle Gardens installed in 2013

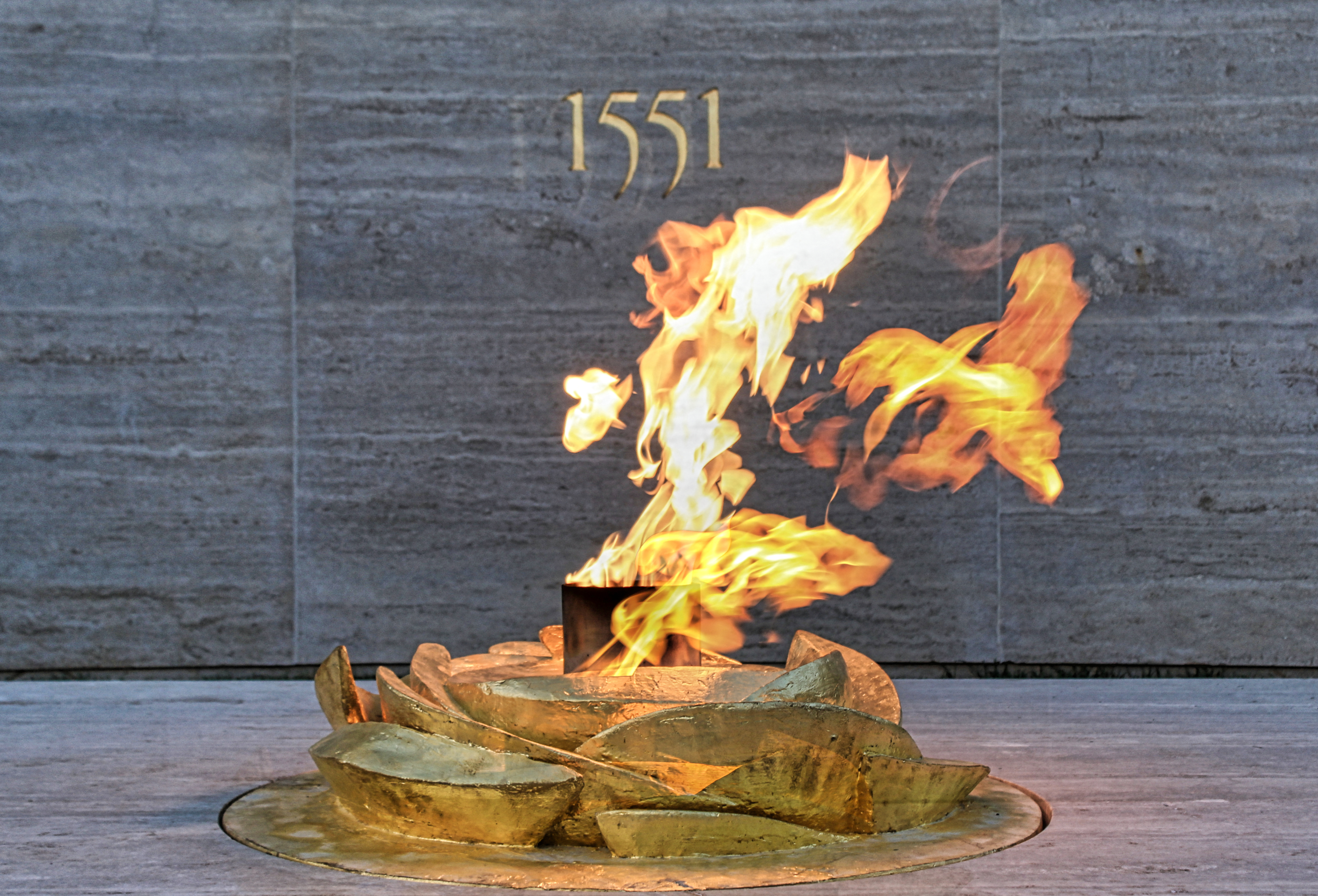
1551 Memorial outside the Ċittadella installed in 2016 (artist John Grima, gilder John Pace).

A plaque with an inscription and a fleur-de-lis commemorating de Opuo was installed on the façade of what is believed to be his former residence within the Castello by Gozo's Università in July 1579. This has since been replaced by a copy, with the original plaque now being preserved at the Gozo Museum of Archaeology.

A mosaic monument referencing the attack was made by children under the direction of artist Mary Portelli and it was installed at Villa Rundle Gardens in 2013. Another monument commemorating the victims of the attack designed by artist John Grima was installed outside the walls of the Cittadella in 2016 as part of a major restoration project. This memorial was gilded by the local artist and Maltese gilder John Pace.

A street in the Cittadella is named Triq Bernardo DeOpuo and a parking area in Victoria is named Pjazza l-Assedju after the attack.

As of the 21st century, annual memorials are held on the anniversary of the attack by the Ministry for Gozo.

=== Literature and the arts ===
The 1551 attack is featured in a number of historical fiction books, including The Disorderly Knights (1966) by Dorothy Dunnett, Eight Pointed Cross (2011), Falcon's Shadow (2020) and Ash Fall (2022) by Marthese Fenech, and Xagħra's Revenge by Geoff Nelder (2017).

Gozitan poet and politician Anton Buttigieg wrote a ballad featuring a dramatised version of the 1551 attack. The siege and its aftermath has also been featured in several paintings by Gozitan artist Paolo Camilleri Cauchi, and it has been the subject of various other re-enactments, poems, musical dramas, concerts, and plays.

== See also ==
- Siege of Malta (1429)
- Great Siege of Malta (1565)
