= Bernardo de Opuo =

Sicilian soldier (died 1551)

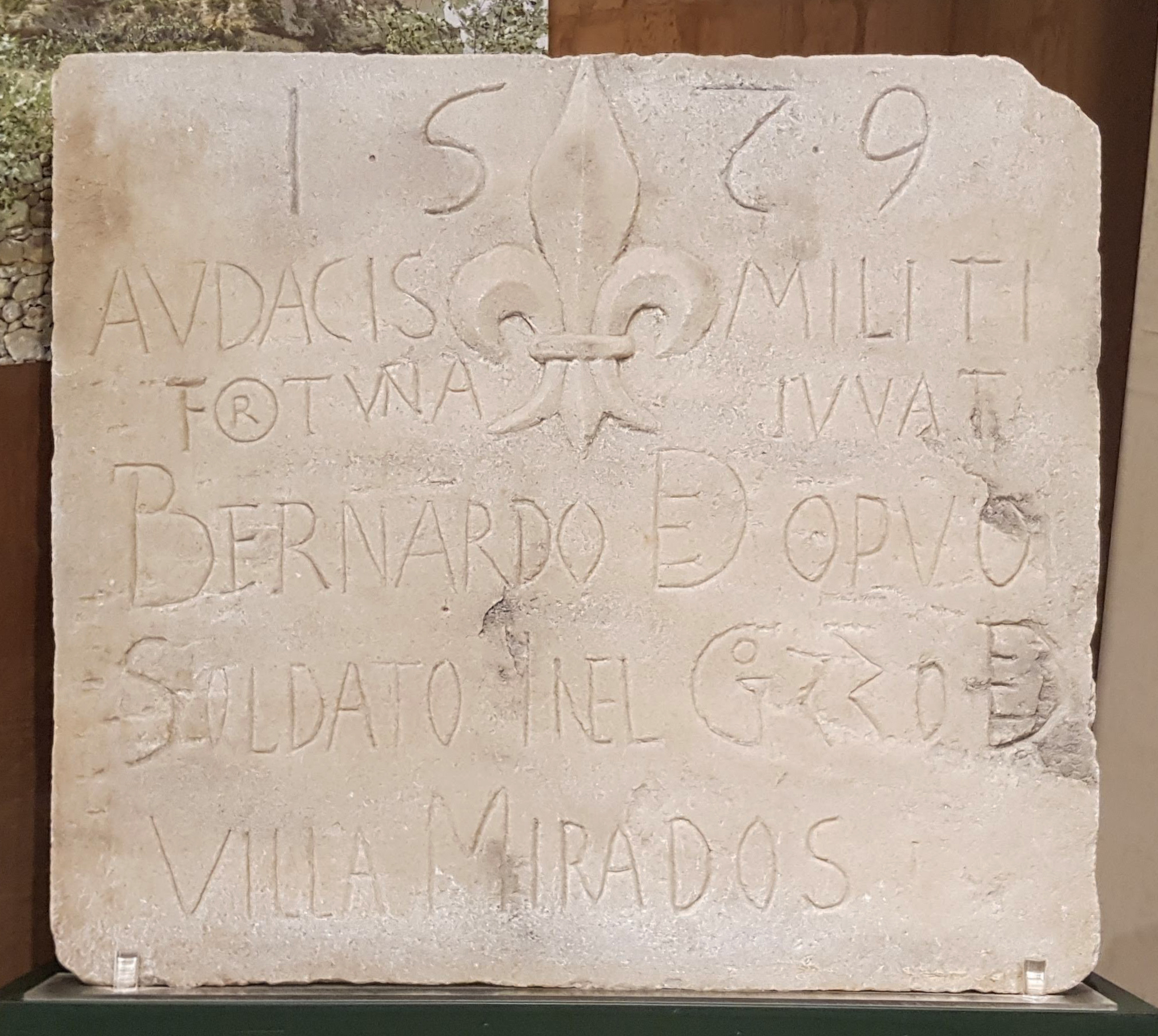
1579 plaque commemorating Bernardo de Opuo, located at the Gozo Museum of Archaeology

Bernardo de Opuo (Note: Sources use several slightly different variants of his name, including Bernardo de Opuo, Bernardo de Opus, Bernardo Du Puo and Bernardo Dupuo.) (died 26 July 1551) was a Sicilian soldier who is known for his actions during the Ottoman attack on Gozo, during which he killed his own family before he himself was killed in the fighting.

== Biography ==
De Opuo was originally from Sicily, and he had settled on the island of Gozo in Hospitaller Malta where he married a woman and had two daughters. He was part of the garrison of the Castello when it was besieged by Ottoman forces in July 1551. On 26 July, when Governor Galatian de Sesse surrendered and the Ottomans proceeded to sack the fortress and began enslaving its inhabitants, de Opuo is said to have been the only one who attempted to resist the invaders.

He stabbed his daughters and wife to death in order to spare them from being raped and enslaved, then armed himself with a crossbow and an arquebus and killed two Turks in the street. He then ran towards a group of attackers and wounded several of them with a sword, but he was quickly surrounded and was killed.

== Inscription ==
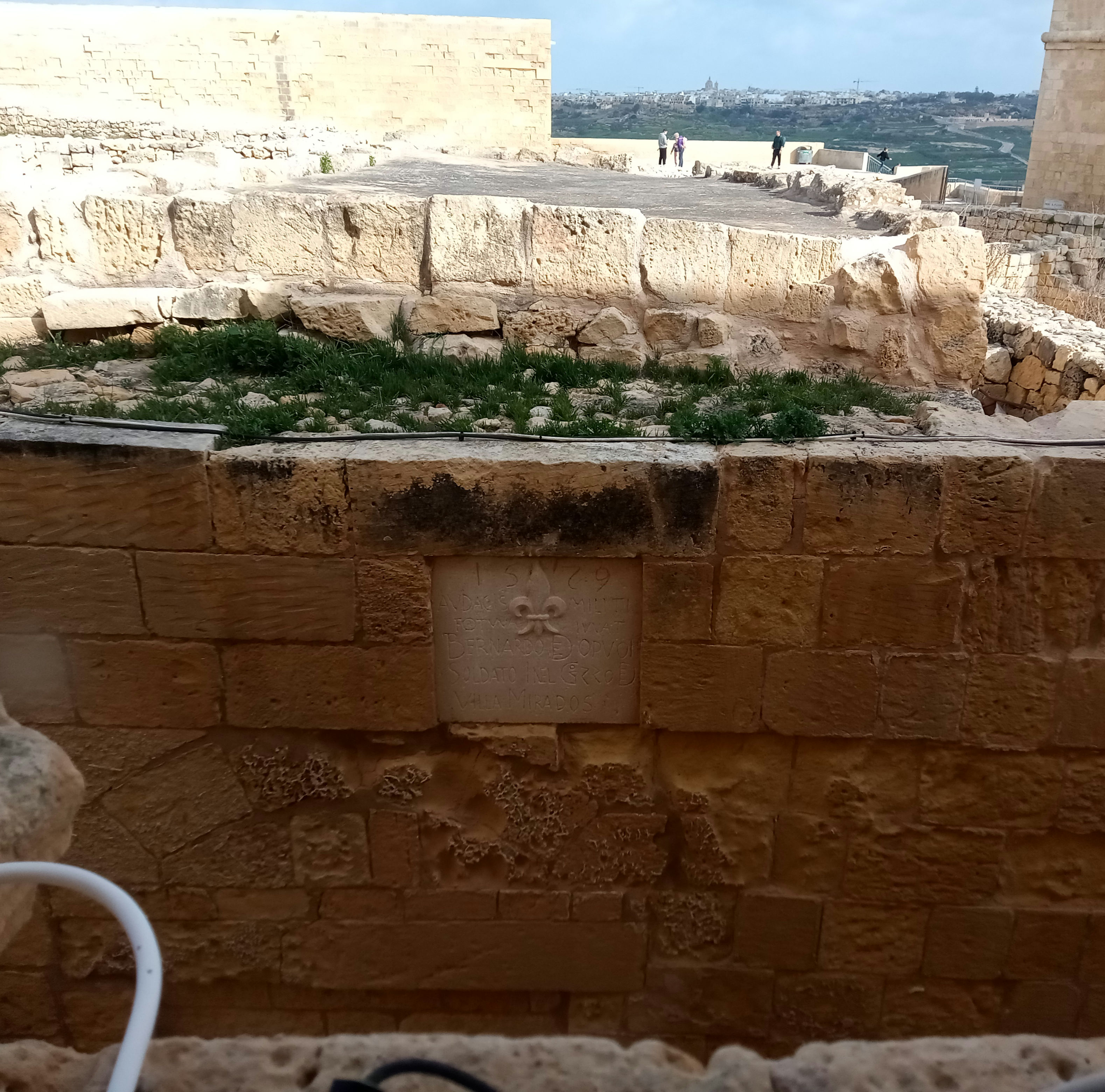
Copy of the above plaque affixed to the façade of what was possibly de Opuo's residence, which now lies in ruins

In July 1579, a plaque with a fleur-de-lis and an inscription commemorating de Opuo was affixed to the façade of a building within the Gozo Castello. This was installed by the Universitas Gaudisii, probably at the initiative of Governor Bernardo d'Aldana. The inscription read as follows:

1579
AVDACIS MILITI
FORTVNA IVVAT
BERNARDO DE OPVO
SOLDATO IN GOZZO DE
VILLA MIRADOS

(meaning Fortune favours the bold combatant – Bernardo De Opuo, soldier in Gozo, from the hamlet of Mirados.)

The significance of the fleur-de-lis on the plaque is unclear. De Opuo's name and his place of birth – an otherwise-unknown village or hamlet named "Mirados" or possibly "Mirandos" – are known solely from this inscription. According to Giovanni Pietro Francesco Agius de Soldanis, by 1745 it was generally believed that the plaque marked the location of what had been de Opuo's residence.

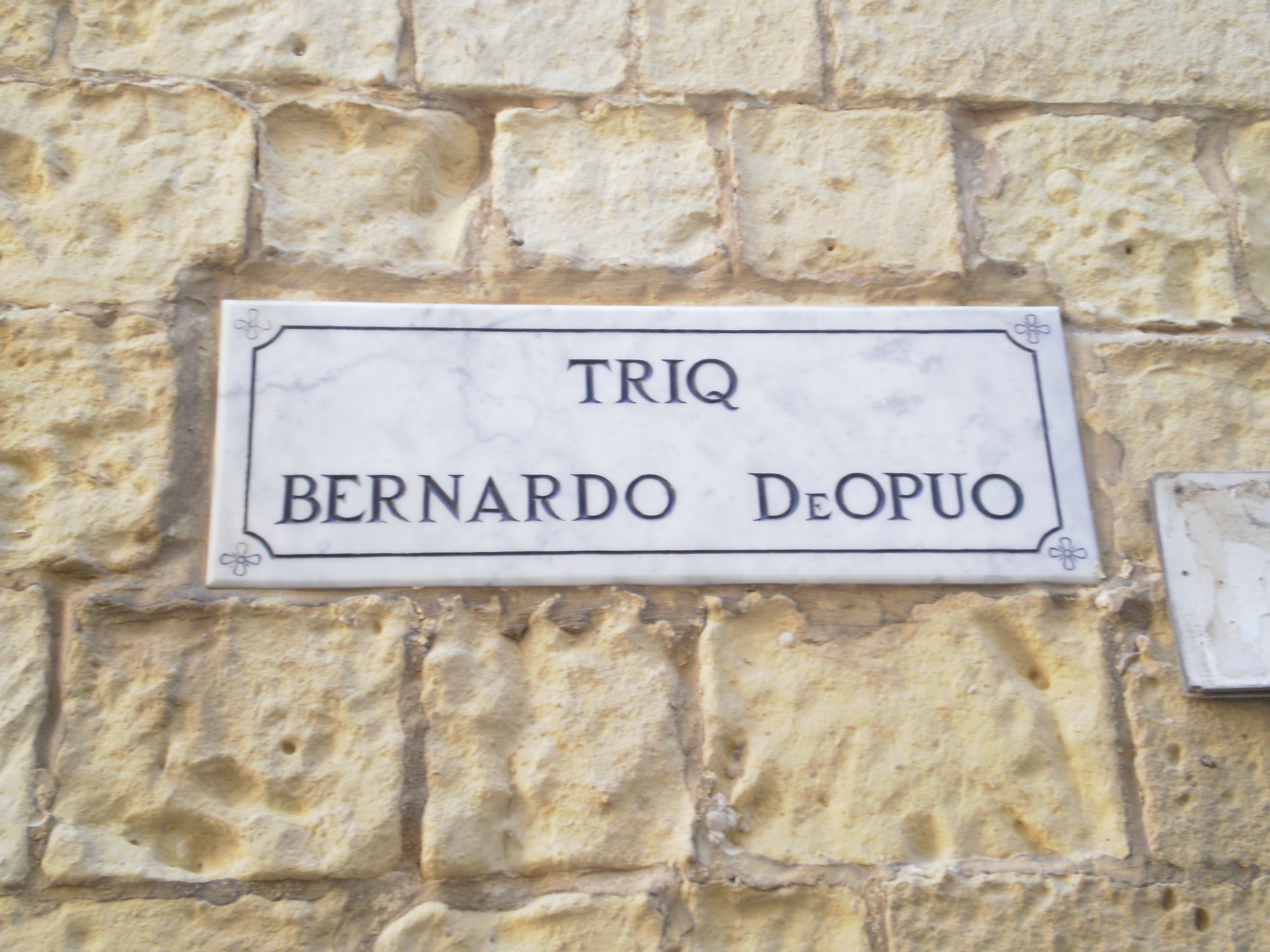
Street name sign for Triq Bernardo DeOpuo

The street in which the plaque was affixed is now named Triq Bernardo DeOpuo in his honour. The plaque itself has been replaced by a copy, while the original one is now preserved at the Gozo Museum of Archaeology.

== Sources and historicity ==
The earliest known mention of de Opuo is in De bello Melitensi by Nicolas Durand de Villegaignon which was published in Paris in 1553; this narrative mentions the episode of a Sicilian soldier killing his family before dying while fighting the Ottomans but does not identify him by name. Villegaignon had been in Malta in July 1551 during the Ottoman attack, and he had played a role in the successful defence of Mdina days before the attack on Gozo.

The story is retold in the 1568 work Les quatre premiers livres des navigations et peregrinations orientales by Nicolas de Nicolay, who was in Malta in the immediate aftermath of the attack in August 1551. Michel de Montaigne made a reference to the episode in a c. 1588–1592 revision to Coustume de l'Isle de Cea, part of his Essais. Montaigne argued that de Opuo's case was an example in which suicide was an acceptable way to avoid a fate worse than death. Like Villegaignon's account, Nicolay's and Montaigne's works do not refer to de Opuo by name.

De Opuo's story is retold in later works including Dell'Istoria della Sacra Religione et Ill[ustrissi]ma Militia di San Giovanni Gierosolimitano by Giacomo Bosio which was published in Rome in 1602, and Histoire des Chevaliers Hospitaliers de S. Jean de Jérusalem appelez depuis Les Chevaliers de Rhodes et aujourd'hui Les Chevaliers de Malta by René-Aubert Vertot which was published in Paris in 1726; these accounts are largely based on Villegaignon's work.

De Opuo's story persisted in Gozo's collective memory in the aftermath of the attack, and in time he came to be seen as a legendary and heroic figure. Some historians have since questioned whether or not de Opuo actually existed, but his mention in near-contemporary sources and the 1579 inscription are regarded as proof of his historicity. Writing in 2022, judge and historian Giovanni Bonello questioned whether de Opuo's killing of his own family should really be described as heroic.

Although it is generally accepted that de Opuo was Sicilian and the earliest sources refer to him as such, some later sources refer to him as a Spaniard.

== See also ==
- Arnaude de Rocas
