= Maymuna =

Arabic female given name

Mahmuna
- Majmuna Tombstone
- Pronunciation: Arabic: [majmunːa, meː-]
- Gender: Female

Origin
- Origin: Arabic
- Meaning: blessed

Other names
- Related names: Maimoonah, Maimuna(h), Maymoonah, Maymunah, Maynmunah, Maimouna, Meymune and Majmuna

Maymūna (ميمونة) is a female Arabic name. Variant spellings in English include: Maimoonah, Maymoonah, Maymuna(h), Maimouna, Mahmuna and Mehmoona, Maimuna, Mymouna(h), Mymona. Its meaning is “Auspicious, Blessed, Loved, The fortunate one”

== Notable people ==
- Maymuna Abu Bakr, Yemeni poet, songwriter, and television director
- Maïmouna Hélène Diarra, Malian actress
- Maimouna Diarra, Senegalese basketball player
- Maïmouna Doucouré, French film director
- Maïmouna Guerresi, Italian artist
- Maïmouna Gueye, Franco-Senegalese actress
- Maymunah bint al-Harith, wife of the Islamic prophet Muhammad
- Maymunah Kadiri, Nigerian mental health advocate
- Maïmouna Kane, Senegalese jurist and politician
- Maimouna N'Diaye, French actress
- Maïmouna Sourang Ndir, Senegalese politician
- Maïmouna Ndoye Seck, Senegalese politician
- Maimouna Traoré, Malian footballer
- Maimouna Youssef, American singer, songwriter, and rapper
- Maymona Mateus, Angolan Researcher

== See also ==
- Majmuna Stone
- Mimouna
