= Geography of Gozo =

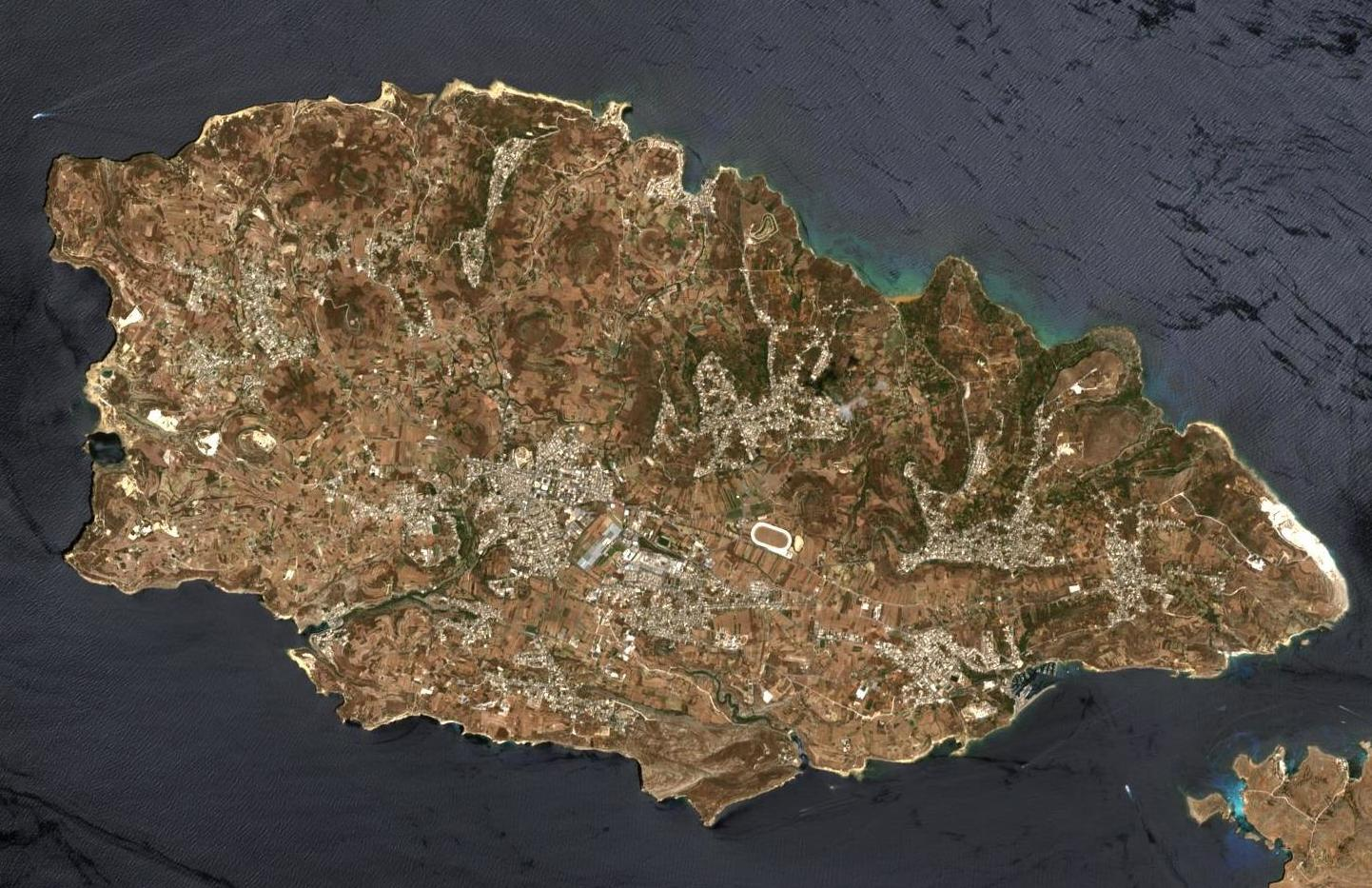
- Satellite image of Gozo
- Continent: Europe
- Region: Southern Europe
- Area
  - Total: 67.1 km^{2} (25.9 sq mi)
  - Land: 100%
  - Water: 0%
- Borders: None
- Highest point: Ta' Dbiegi
- Lowest point: Mediterranean Sea
- Exclusive economic zone: 71,446 km2

The geography of Gozo, is dominated by water as it is the second largest island in the Maltese archipelago and is made up out of limestone. There are several islands which fall under Gozitan jurisdiction and thus are additions to the overarching Maltese archipelago. The main island of Gozo is located 7 kilometres (4.3 mi) northwest of the main island of Malta. It is mostly known for its multitude of low-lying hills. The highest point in Gozo is Ta' Dbiegi hill, which falls under the San Lawrenz local council. The island of Comino, which is also the third largest island in Malta, falls under Gozo.

== Extreme Points of Gozo ==
	Reqqa Point (northernmost point)	
San Dimitri Point (westernmost point)	Ta' Dbiegi hill (highest altitude)	Ras il-Qala (easternmost point on contiguous Gozo)
San Dimitri Point (westernmost point)	Newwiela Point (southernmost point on contiguous Gozo)	Ras il-Qala (easternmost point on contiguous Gozo)
	Lantern Point (southernmost point on non-contiguous Gozo)	Sultan Rock (easternmost point on non-contiguous Gozo)

Lantern Point and Sultan Rock are both found on Comino.

San Dimitri Point and Reqqa Point are the westernmost and northernmost points of the entirety of the Maltese islands.

The lowest altitude of Gozo is obviously 0 metres (0 ft) above sea level as the island is surrounded by the Mediterranean Sea.

== Index of hills in Gozo ==
	Corresponding Villages (If Any)	Highest Elevation	Image	References
Iż-Żebbug	Iz-Zebbug	165 metres (541 ft)		
Ta' Dabrani	Iz-Zebbug	141 metres (463 ft)		
Ta' Kuljat	Iz-Zebbug	166 metres (545 ft)		
Ix-Xagħra	Xaghra	143 metres (469 ft)		
In-Nuffara	Xaghra	144 metres (472 ft)		
In-Nadur	Nadur, Qala	162 metres (531 ft)		
Ta' Sannat / Ta' Ċenċ	Sannat	171 metres (561 ft)		
Kerċem	Kercem	159 metres (522 ft)		
Ta' Dbieġi	San Lawrenz	190 metres (620 ft)		
Ta' Għammar	Għasri	186 metres (610 ft)		
Il-Ġordan	Għasri	163 metres (535 ft)		
