= Portelli =

Portelli is an Italian and Maltese surname. Notable people with the surname include:

- Alessandro Portelli (born 1942), Italian scholar of American literature and culture
- Alexandre Elói Portelli (1767–1838), Portuguese-born Brazilian general and engineer
- Angelo Portelli, born Francis Saviour Portelli (1852−1927), Maltese auxiliary Bishop of Malta
- Carlo Portelli (died 1574), Italian painter of the Renaissance period
- Frank Portelli (disambiguation), multiple people
- Freddie Portelli (born 1944), Maltese singer and songwriter
- Guy Portelli (born 1957), British sculptor
- Ġużepp Portelli (1880–1949), Maltese Roman Catholic prelate
- Hugues Portelli (born 1947), member of the Senate of France
- John Peter Portelli (born 1954), Maltese educationist and philosopher
- Leo Portelli (born 1946), Maltese archer, competitor at the 1980 Summer Olympics
- Nikolai Portelli (born 1981), Maltese athlete

== See also ==
- Ortelli
- Portel (disambiguation)
- Sportelli
