= Maymūnah Stone =

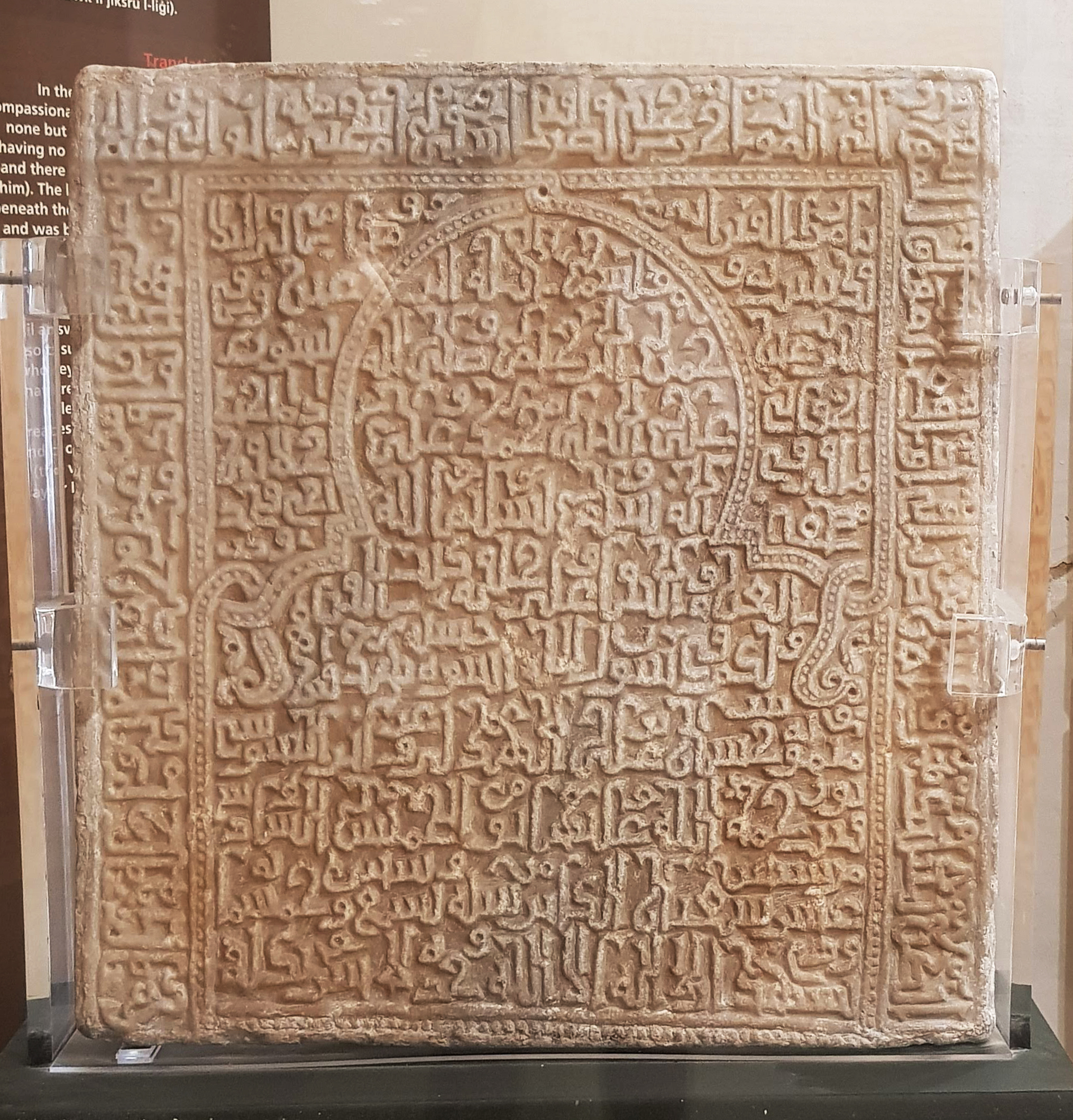
- The Maymūnah Stone
- Material: Marble
- Writing: Kufic Arabic script
- Created: 1174 (marble reuse of Roman period)
- Discovered: Unknown, possibly near Xewkija and Sannat, Gozo, Malta
- Present location: Gozo Museum of Archaeology

The Maymūnah Stone (Maltese: il-Ġebla ta' Majmuna or il-Ħaġra ta' Majmuna, Arabic: شاهد قبر ميمونة) is a 12th-century marble tombstone (of Roman origins) which is believed to have been discovered in Xewkija, Gozo, Malta. According to judge and historian Giovanni Bonello, the Majmuna Stone is a "spectacular visual relic of the Islamic presence in Malta." It is now exhibited in the Gozo Museum of Archaeology at the Cittadella of Victoria, Gozo.

== Description ==
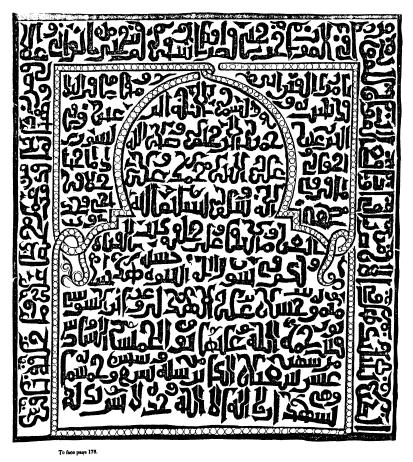
Copy of the tombstone, from 1841

The marble stone was originally used in the Roman period as its backside indicates. A relief in the form of a rose was sculpted in the Roman architectural style. It was later reused as a tombstone. It is the only islamic funerary stone in Malta of its period to be still intact in its original size and the only one which gives a date.

The Majmuna Stone is the tombstone of a girl called Majmuna, who died on 21 March 1174. It is a marble slab which has Roman decorations on the back (such reuse was a common occurrence in Islamic North Africa). The Kufic Arabic inscription approximately translates to:

In the name of Allah, the merciful and compassionate. May He be propitious to the Prophet Muhammad and to his followers and grant them eternal salvation.

God is great and eternal and He has decreed that his creatures should perish. Of this the prophet of Allah bears witness.
This is the tomb of Maymūnah, daughter of Hassān, son of ‘Ali al-Hudali, known as Ibn as-Susi. She died – Allah's mercy be upon her – on Thursday 16th day of the month of Sha'ban in the year 569, professing that there is only one God who has no equal.
Look around you! Is there anything everlasting on earth; anything that repels or casts a spell on death? Death robbed me from a palace and, alas, neither doors nor bolts could save me. All I did in my lifetime remains, and shall be reckoned.

Oh he who looks upon this tomb! I am already consumed inside it, and dust has settled on my eyes. On my couch in my abode there is nothing but tears, and what is to happen at my resurrection when I shall appear before my Creator? Oh my brother, be wise and repent.

The inscription is dated 1174, almost a century after the Norman invasion of Malta in 1091. It is believed that Islam remained the dominant religion in Malta until the Muslims were expelled in 1224.

== Recent history ==
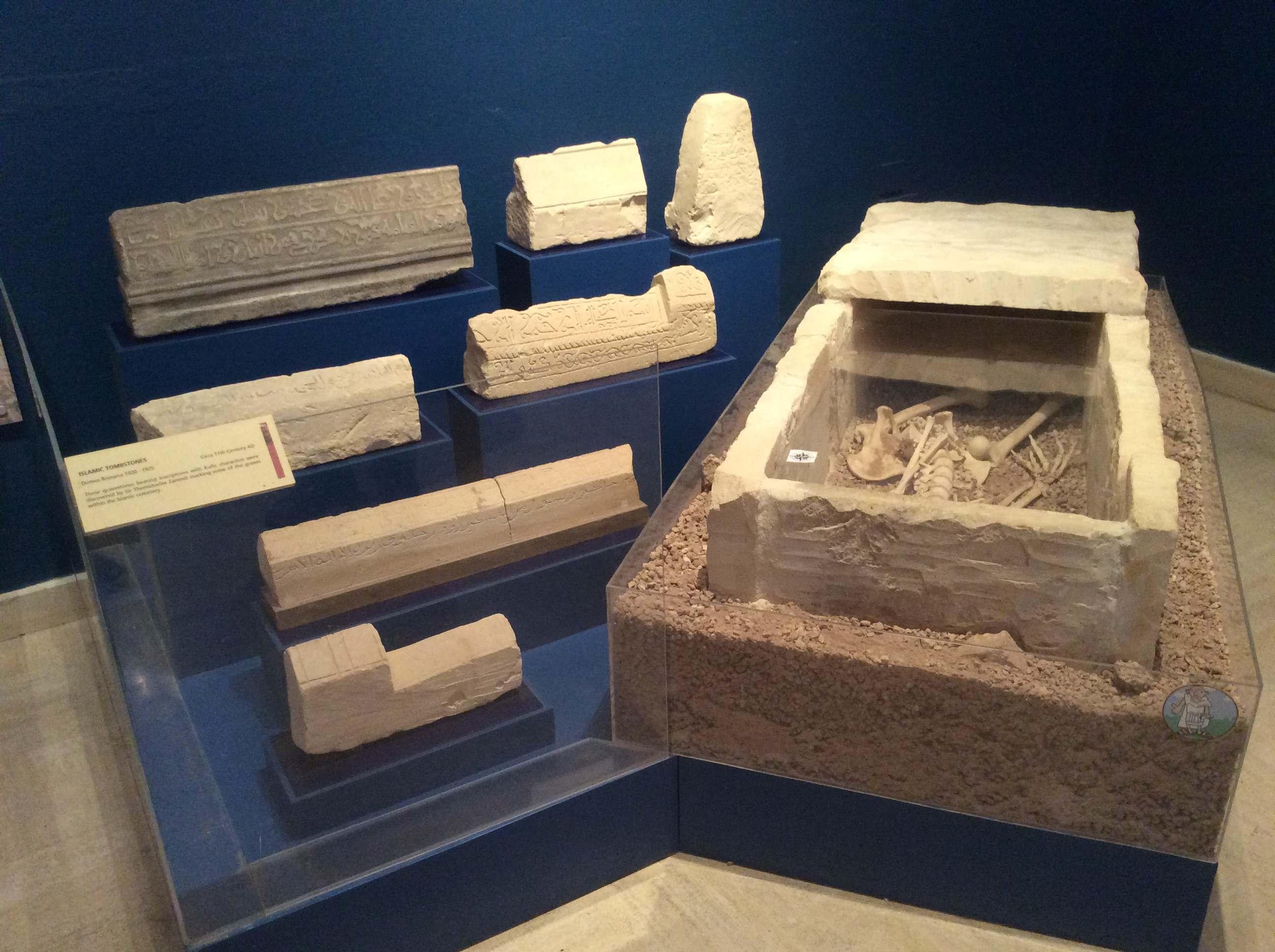
Other visual Islamic funerary found at the Domvs Romana in Rabat, Malta

The date and location of discovery of the Majmuna Stone are unknown. It is traditionally held that the stone was found in an area known as Ta' Majmuna, between the Gozitan villages of Xewkija and Sannat. However, it is also possible that the stone was not found in Malta at all, and it might originate from Tunisia, North Africa.

In his 1772 book Malta illustrata ovvero descrizione di Malta isola del Mare Siciliano e Adriatico, Count Giovannantonio Ciantar wrote about the stone and illustrated it, but he was not able to decipher its writing. Ciantar wrote that the tombstone was located in the courtyard of a private residence.

In 1799, during the Maltese uprising against French occupation, Paul I of Russia sent the diplomat Andrey Italinski to ensure the insurgents that they had Russian protection. Italinski examined the stone during his stay in Malta, and was the first person who managed to decipher part of its inscription.

In an undated early 19th century scrapbook, Father Giuseppe Carmelo Gristi recorded that the stone was discovered "in Malta," and was preserved at Baron Muscat's residence in Valletta. By 1839, the stone belonged to the Xara family, and it was eventually passed down to Baron Sir Giuseppe Maria de Piro. In 1845, de Piro donated it to the Public Library.

The stone has been part of the collections of the Gozo Museum of Archaeology since 1960. It has been called "the pride and joy" of the museum.

== See also ==
- Islam in Malta
