= Sportelli =

Sportelli is a surname of Italian origin. It includes the following notable individuals:

- Cesare Sportelli (1702–1750), Italian lawyer and Catholic priest
- Franco Sportelli, Italian actor
- Luca Sportelli (1927–1999), Italian actor

== See also ==
- Ortelli
- Portelli
- Sportellidae
