= Galatian de Sesse =

Governor of Gozo
- In office 1551 – 26 July 1551
- Appointed by: Juan de Homedes
- Preceded by: Andrea Castelletta (as Capitano della Verga)
- Succeeded by: Pietro Olivares (1553)

Military service
- Allegiance: (Sovereign Military Order of Malta) Order of Saint John
- Battles/wars: Invasion of Gozo (1551)

Galatian de Sesse (Note: Sources use many slightly different variants of his name, including Galatian de Sesse, Galatien de Sesse, Galitan de Sesse, Gelatian de Sessa, Galatiano de Sesse, Galaziano de Sesse and Galiziano de Sessè.) was an Aragonese Hospitaller knight who was Governor of Gozo in 1551, when the island was invaded by the Ottoman Empire. De Sesse was in command of an obsolete and weakly-defended Castello, which he surrendered to Ottoman admiral Sinan Pasha after two days of bombardment. De Sesse and between 5,000 and 7,000 other people – the majority of the island's population – were subsequently enslaved, and he spent five years as a galley slave before being ransomed and freed.

== Governorship and attack of 1551 ==
De Sesse was appointed as Governor of Gozo in 1551, replacing Andrea Castelletta who had held the title of Capitano della Verga. This appointment was reportedly in recognition of his military valour. 18th-century Gozitan historian Giovanni Pietro Francesco Agius de Soldanis claimed that de Sesse was the first Governor of Gozo, but there are records of previous officeholders who had held that same title prior to him.

When a large Ottoman force landed on Gozo on 22 July 1551, de Sesse sent a messenger to Hospitaller Grand Master Juan de Homedes requesting assistance from Malta. This was unsuccessful as the messenger was intercepted and interrogated by the invading forces, and two days later the Ottomans began bombarding the Castello where de Sesse and the majority of Gozo's population were taking refuge.

The castle's defences were obsolete and it was not adequately manned, and after it became clear that no relief from Malta would be forthcoming, de Sesse and the Gozitan elites decided to ask for a truce. They sent a monk as an emissary to Ottoman admiral Sinan Pasha and they offered to surrender if 200 wealthy citizens were spared, but Sinan only agreed to spare 40 people.

On 26 July, de Sesse agreed to these terms and the fortress' gate was opened. Contrary to expectations, the Ottomans spared 40 elderly men rather than the elites, and they proceeded to sack the Castello and enslave the people inside, who numbered between 5,000 and 7,000 according to different sources. De Sesse was among the first to be captured, and he was forced to carry a cart full of his riches to the Ottoman fleet where the plunder was loaded along with the captives.

== Aftermath ==
Grand Master Homedes is said to have wanted de Sesse and former Governor of Tripoli Gaspard de Vallier – who had surrendered Hospitaller Tripoli to Sinan Pasha less than a month after the sack of Gozo – to pay with their lives. In late August 1551, the Hospitallers set up an inquiry to investigate de Sesse's actions, and prosecutor Gonsalez Diaz argued that the governor should have died fighting rather than surrender, and he requested that de Sesse be expelled from the Hospitaller order. No decision was taken at this point, as the Order's Council stated that no judgement could be given in absentia. The knight Pietro Olivares was appointed as the new Governor of Gozo in 1553.

In the meantime, de Sesse spent five years as a galley slave under the Ottomans. He was freed after paying a ransom, but upon his return to Malta in 1556 he was arrested and imprisoned. By that time, Homedes had died and he had been succeeded as Grand Master by Claude de la Sengle, who took a more lenient approach. All charges against de Sesse were later dropped and he was released on 14 August 1557, days before la Sengle's own death.

Some sources describe de Sesse as having shown poor leadership during the 1551 attack. Others state that he was not to blame for how events transpired as he could not have done much given the numerical superiority of the enemy and the weakness of the island's defences, and that it was de Homedes who was truly to blame as the latter's inaction created the conditions which allowed the sacking to occur.
