= Maïmouna Ndoye Seck =

Senegalese politician

Minister of Air Transport and Airport Facilities Development
- Incumbent
- Assumed office September 7, 2017
- President: Macky Sall
- Prime Minister: Mahammed Dionne
- Preceded by: Herself (Minister of Air Transport)

Minister of Tourism and Air Transport
- In office June 22, 2015 – September 7, 2017
- President: Macky Sall
- Prime Minister: Mahammed Dionne
- Preceded by: Abdoulaye Diouf Sarr
- Succeeded by: Mame Mbaye Niang (Minister of Tourism); Herself (Minister of Air Transport)

Minister of Energies and Sustainable Energy Development
- In office September 1, 2013 – June 22, 2015
- President: Macky Sall
- Prime Minister: Aminata Touré; Mahammed Dionne
- Preceded by: Aly Ngouille Ndiaye
- Succeeded by: Thierno Alassane Sall

Personal details
- Born: 1962 (age 63–64) Dakar, Senegal
- Education: École Polytechnique, Thiès
- Occupation: Mathematician; Engineer

Maïmouna Ndoye Seck (born 1962 in Dakar) is a Senegalese politician. An alumnus of the Ecole Polytechnique of Thiès, she was the Minister of Energy from 2013 to 2015 and the Minister of Tourism and Air Transport from 2015 to 2017, before she became the Minister of Air Transport and Airport Facilities Development in September 2017.

== Biography ==
Seck was born in 1962 in Dakar and studied Engineering and Mechanical Engineering/Design at the École Polytechnique de Thiès from 1982. She was the first woman to graduate from that school. She also earned a master's degree in energy management and economics.

Seck was the Principal Private Secretary of the Ministry of Energy, and a government advisor. In 2013, she joined the Touré Government as the Minister of Energy, before she became the Minister of Energy and Sustainable Energy Development within the First Dionne Government in 2014.

Seck has chaired the Electricity Sector Regulatory Committee (CRSE) with the aim of making energy affordable at a lower price.

Following to the 2015 cabinet reshuffle, Seck became Minister of Tourism and Air Transport with the aim of re-organising a sector in difficulty notably due to the difficulties of Senegal Airlines.
