= Frank Portelli =

Frank Portelli may refer to:

- Frank Portelli (artist) (1922–2004), Maltese artist and mural painter
- Frank Portelli (politician) (1944–2026), member of the Maltese Parliament
