= Portel =

Portel may refer to the following places:

- Portel, Portugal, a municipality in Portugal
- Portel, Pará, a municipality in Brazil

== See also ==
- Le Portel, Pas-de-Calais, France
- Canton of Le Portel, northern France
- Col de Portel, mountain pass in the French Pyrenees
- Portel-des-Corbières, southern France
