= Nuffara =

Archeological site and hill in Gozo, Malta

- In-Nuffara (Maltese)
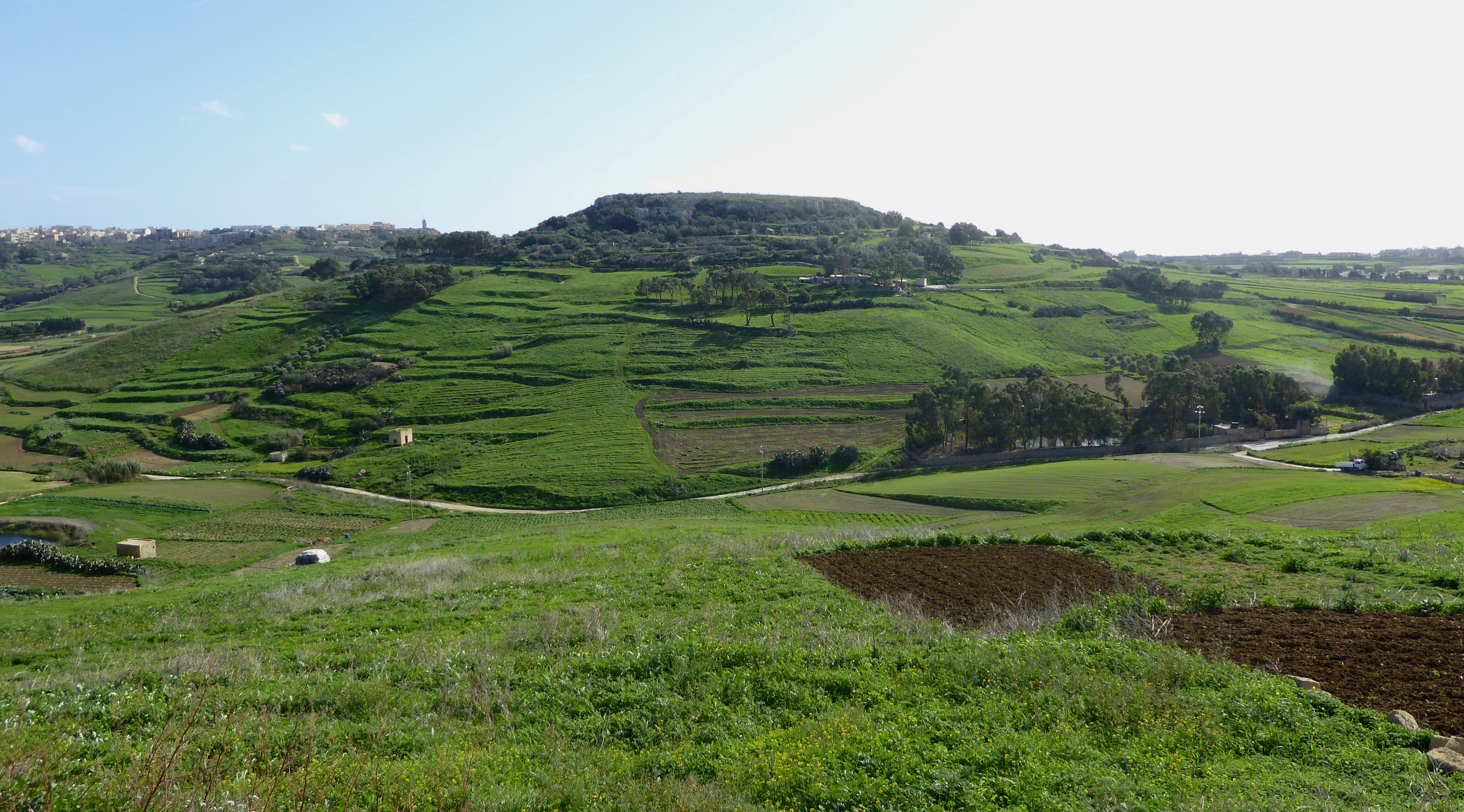
- The hill that the site stands on

- Location within Malta
- 36°2′30″N 14°16′24″E
- Location: Xaghra

History
- Built: 1500 BC

Site notes
- Elevation: 472 ft (144 m)
- Area: 19,689 Square Metres

Nuffara (Maltese: In-Nuffara) is an archeological site in Xaghra, Gozo, Malta. The site itself is located on a plateau close to the Ġgantija site. Although most of the remains have eroded, some grain storage pits can still be seen by visitors. A storage pit was cleared in 1961, producing a large amount of sherds. The site is believed to have been a major village used during 1500BCE to 700BCE.
