= Ortelli =

Ortelli is a surname and may refer to:

- Arnoldo Ortelli, Swiss footballer
- Guillermo Ortelli (born 1973), Argentine racing car driver
- Stéphane Ortelli (born 1970), Monegasque racing driver
- Toni Ortelli (1904–2000), Italian alpinist, conductor and composer
- Vito Ortelli (1921–2017), Italian racing cyclist

== See also ==
- Orotelli
- Sportelli
- Tortelli
