= Maymuna Abu Bakr =

Yemeni lyricist

Maymuna Abu Bakr (born 1948) is a Yemeni poet, songwriter and television director, the first Yemeni woman to publish a poetry collection in southern Yemen.

Maymuna Abu Bakr was born in Mukalla. She holds degrees in sociology and English, and trained in television direction in Egypt.

== Works ==
- Khuyut fi-l-shafaq [Threads in the twilight], Aden: Dar al-Tali'a.
