= Maïmouna Guerresi =

Italian multimedia artist

Maïmouna Guerresi (born Patrizia Guerresi; 1951 in Italy) is an Italian-Senegalese multimedia artist working with photography, sculpture, video, and installation. Her work incorporates Afro-Asian themes and symbolism with traditional European iconography.

== Life ==
Born as Patrizia Guerresi in Italy to a religious Catholic family, in 1991, Guerresi traveled in Africa and converted to Sufi Islam in Senegal. Acknowledging a new identity and new direction for her work, she adopted the name Maïmouna. Guerresi lives and works in Verona and Milan, Italy, New York City and Dakar, Senegal.

== Work ==
Guerresi's work presents an intimate perspective on the spirituality of human beings and their relationship to their inner mystical dimension. West African expressions of Sufism in particular are an inspiration for Guerresi's work. Guerresi's images are delicate narratives with fluid sequencing, and an appreciation of shared humanity beyond borders – psychological, cultural, religious and political. Recurrent metaphors such as milk, light, the hijab, trees, and contrasting white and black create awareness of the vital unifying qualities of Islamic spirituality, while Guerresi's work's embrace of hybrid spirituality and African, Asian, and European cultural ancestry ultimately reflects that of her global approach to both art and life.

== Collections ==
The artist's work is found in private and public collections throughout the world including: Smithsonian National Museum of African Art, Washington, D.C.; Los Angeles County Museum of Art; Minneapolis Institute of Art; Hood Museum of Art, Dartmouth College, Hanover, New Hampshire; and the Museum of African Contemporary Art Al Maaden.

== Select exhibitions ==
Her work has been extensively exhibited in solo and group shows all over Europe, Africa, the United States, Asia, and the Middle East. Guerresi was invited to participate in the Italian pavilion at the Venice Biennale in 1982-1986-2011 as well as at the 1987 Documenta K18 in Kassel, Germany.

More recent museum shows include: Atlanta Contemporary Art Center, USA, 2004; Biennal “Les Rencontres de Bamako” the National Museum of Bamako, Mali, 2009; Central Electrique, Brussels, 2010; Fondation Boghossian, Villa Empain, Brussels, 2011; French Institute, Fez, Morocco, 2011; KIASMA Museum of Contemporary Art, Helsinki, Finland, 2011; National Institute of Design in Ahmedabad, India 2012; Cultural Institute of Islam, Paris, France, 2013; Pole de la Photographie, France; Camhane Art Center, collateral exhibition for the Istanbul Biennal Turkey, 2013; F.A.R Museum in Rimini, Italy, 2013; Biennale Chobi Mela, Dhakka, Bangladesh, 2013; National Museum of Bahrain, UAE, 2014; National Museum of Sharjah, UAE, 2014; Re-signification, Museo Bardini, Florence, 2015; Islamic Art Now, Part II: Contemporary Art from the Middle East, Los Angeles County Museum of Art, Los Angeles, 2016; The Fall: Awa and Adama, Mariane Ibrahim Gallery, Chicago, 2022; Villes Nouvelles and Ancient Shadows / Sebaatou Rijal, Aga Khan Museum and Aga Khan Park, Toronto, 2022; Ruh | Spirito | Roots of Spirituality, KYOTOGRAPHIE, Kyoto, 2023; Being and belonging, Royal Ontario Museum, Toronto 2023; Nur/Luce/, Triggiano, Bari, 2023; A Spiritual and Political Journey, Museo Ettore Fico, Torino, 2023; A WORLD IN COMMON: Contemporary African Photography, Tate Modern, London, 2024.

Guerresi participated in the exhibition I Am. . .Contemporary Women Artists of Africa at the Smithsonian National Museum of African Art from June 2019-April 2022.

== Publications ==
- Guerresi, Maïmouna. Inner Constellations, 2015. ISBN 0990380882
