= Giovanni Pietro Francesco Agius de Soldanis =

Maltese lawyer, historian, and linguist (1712–1770)

Canon Giovanni Pietro Francesco Agius de Soldanis
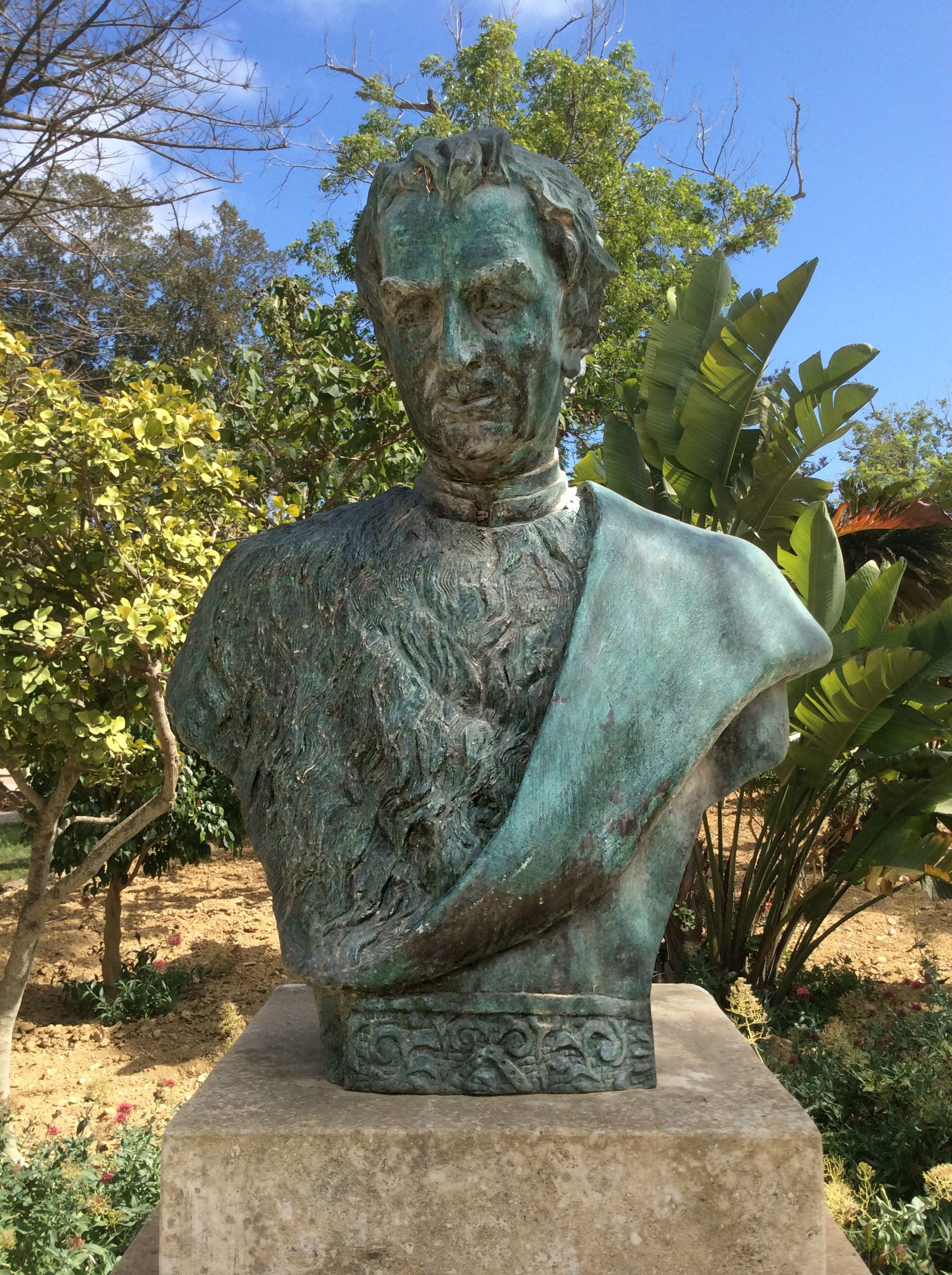
- Bust of de Soldanis at the Villa Rundle gardens
- Born: Ġann Piet Franġisk Agius; 1 November 1712; Rabat, Gozo, Hospitaller Malta
- Died: 30 January 1770 (aged 57)
- Resting place: Collegiate Parish Church of St Paul's Shipwreck, Valletta
- Education: Collegium Melitense, Valletta; University of Padua
- Occupation: Priest · Lawyer · Librarian
- Parents: Andrea Hagius (father); Valenzia Sultana (mother)

Canon Giovanni Pietro Francesco Agius de Soldanis (Maltese: Ġann Piet Franġisk Agius de Soldanis, 30 October 1712 – 30 January 1770), often called de Soldanis (Maltese: Sultana), was a Maltese linguist, historian and cleric from the island of Gozo. He wrote the first lexicon and systematic grammar of the Maltese language, and he was the first librarian of the Bibliotheca Publica, the precursor of the National Library of Malta.

== Life ==
De Soldanis was born on 1 November 1712 in Rabat, Gozo, to Andrea Hagius and Valenzia Sultana. He was baptised in the Parish Church of St. George the following day. He was born Giovanni Pietro Francesco Agius, but he later added de Soldanis to his name, a Latinized version of his mother's surname Sultana, and he is now commonly known by that name.

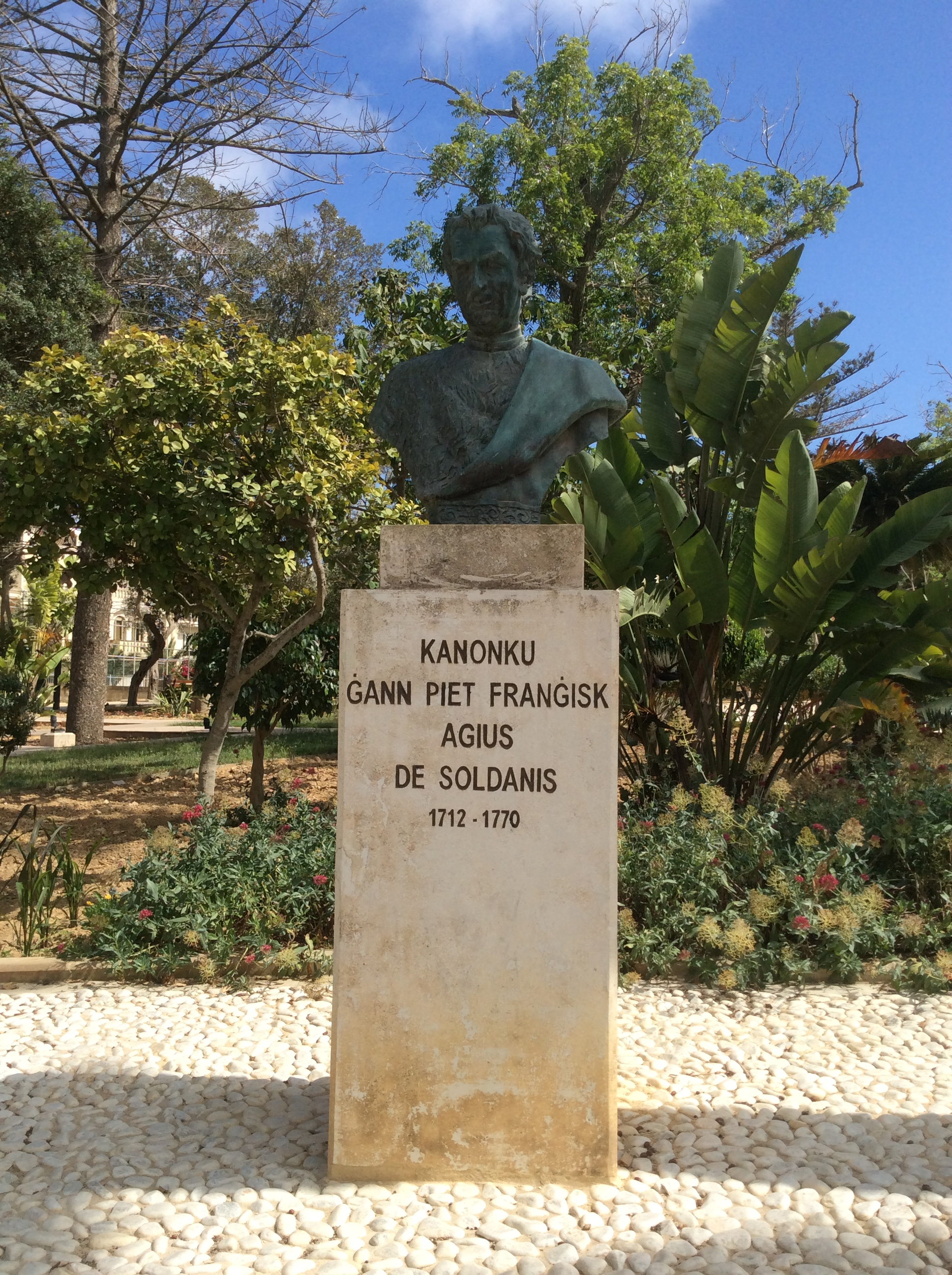
Monument of de Soldanis at Villa Rundle Gardens in Victoria, Gozo

De Soldanis was privately educated by a Capuchin friar at the convent of Our Lady of Graces. He later studied literature, philosophy, theology and law at the Collegium Melitense in Valletta. De Soldanis was appointed canon of the Gozo Matrice by Bishop Paul Alphéran de Bussan in 1729, and he was ordained priest six years later in 1735.

De Soldanis was interested in history, culture, archaeology and the Maltese language. He had an extensive library and a museum in his house, which contained various old coins and medals, inscriptions, pottery and statues. He wrote several manuscripts in a number of languages, including Maltese, Italian and French. He published some of his works in Rome, Naples, Venice and Avignon, but he never published anything in Malta since there was no printing press at the time.

In 1753, he was appointed quaresimalista of Gozo, the official preacher of Advent and Lenten sermons at the Matrice, which was considered to be a position of privilege. Due to the influence of the bishop's brother, De Soldanis traveled throughout Italy and France in the 1750s. At this point, he studied at the University of Padua and graduated as a lawyer. He also became a member of the Accademia degli Apatisti in Florence, the Accademia Botanica of Cortona, and the Accademia di Buongusto and the Accademia degli Erranti in Palermo.

In 1758, de Soldanis returned to Gozo, but he moved to mainland Malta in 1763, when the knight Louis Guérin de Tencin chose him as the first librarian of the Bibliotheca Publica in Valletta, the precursor of the National Library of Malta.

De Soldanis' health began to deteriorate in 1768. He died on 30 January 1770, and he was buried at the Collegiate Parish Church of St Paul's Shipwreck in Valletta.

De Soldanis owned a Muslim boy named Alì as a slave; in his writings de Soldanis noted that Alì's mother and six brothers were also enslaved in Malta and that he resisted pressure to convert to Christianity.

== Works ==
=== Maltese language ===
Throughout his life, De Soldanis wrote a number of works about the Maltese language, which was his main area of interest. He wrote the first grammar of the Maltese language in 1750, after he was informed that the Portuguese knight Almeida wanted such a grammar to be published. The book was entitled Della Lingua Punica presentemente usata da Maltesi, ovvero Nuovi Documenti li quali possono servire di lume all'antica Lingua Etrusca, stesi in due dissertazioni, and it was published in Rome. In this work, de Soldanis hypothesizes that Maltese originates from the Punic language which he thought descended from the Etruscan language. This hypothesis was later disproven, and Maltese is now regarded as descended from Siculo-Arabic.

From 1750 to 1762, de Soldanis worked on a second grammar entitled Nuova Scuola della Lingua Punica, but it was never published. He also wrote a four-volume Maltese-Latin-Italian dictionary entitled Damma tal-Kliem Kartaginis mscerred fel fomm tal Maltin u Ghaucin between 1750 and 1767. Although it also remained unpublished, this is regarded as his most influential work about the Maltese language, since it presents a unique picture of mid-18th century Maltese.

=== Other works ===
Apart from studies on the Maltese language, de Soldanis also wrote works relating to history, archaeology and other topics related to Malta and Gozo. His magnum opus is Il Gozo Antico-Moderno e Sacro-Profano, a two-volume manuscript dealing with the history of Gozo completed in 1746. The manuscript served as the basis for further studies on Gozo, but it remained unpublished until 1936, when the Government Press published a translation in Maltese by Giuseppe Farrugia Gioioso. A translation in English by Anthony Mercieca was published in 1999.

In 1751, de Soldanis published Mustafà Bassà di Rodi schiavo in Malta, o sia la di lui congiura all'occupazione di Malta descritta da Michele Acciard, dealing with the Conspiracy of the Slaves which had occurred two years earlier. This book landed him in trouble with Grand Master Manuel Pinto da Fonseca, since in it he attacked the Order of St. John and argued for the rights of the Maltese. De Soldanis had to go to Rome to defend himself in front of Pope Benedict XIV, but he returned to Malta in 1752 and was forgiven by Pinto.

De Soldanis also wrote a series of dialogues, which are now regarded as having linguistic and socio-cultural importance.

Many of De Soldanis' works and manuscripts are now found at the National Library of Malta.

== Commemorations ==
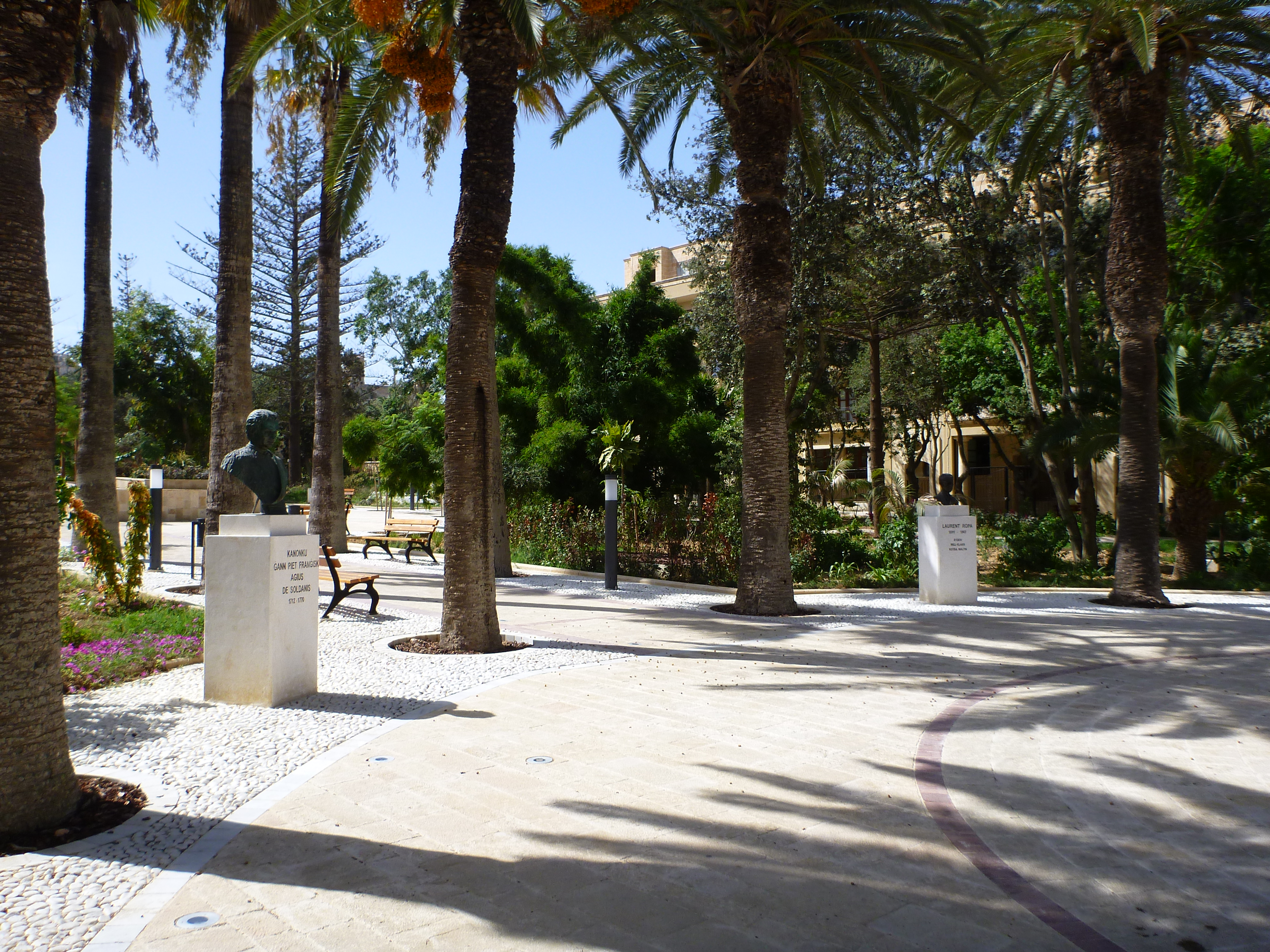
Bust of de Soldanis (left) at Villa Rundle Gardens

Agius de Soldanis Girls' Junior Lyceum and Secondary School in Victoria, Gozo, the only girls' school in Gozo and one of the largest schools in Malta, is named after de Soldanis. His bust is found in Villa Rundle Gardens in Victoria.

The 300th anniversary of de Soldanis' birth was celebrated in 2012 with exhibitions and other events in Victoria and Valletta. A plaque in his honour was unveiled at St. George's Square, Victoria in 2013.
