= Villa Rundle =

Garden in Malta

Coordinates: 36.0433°N 14.2425°E

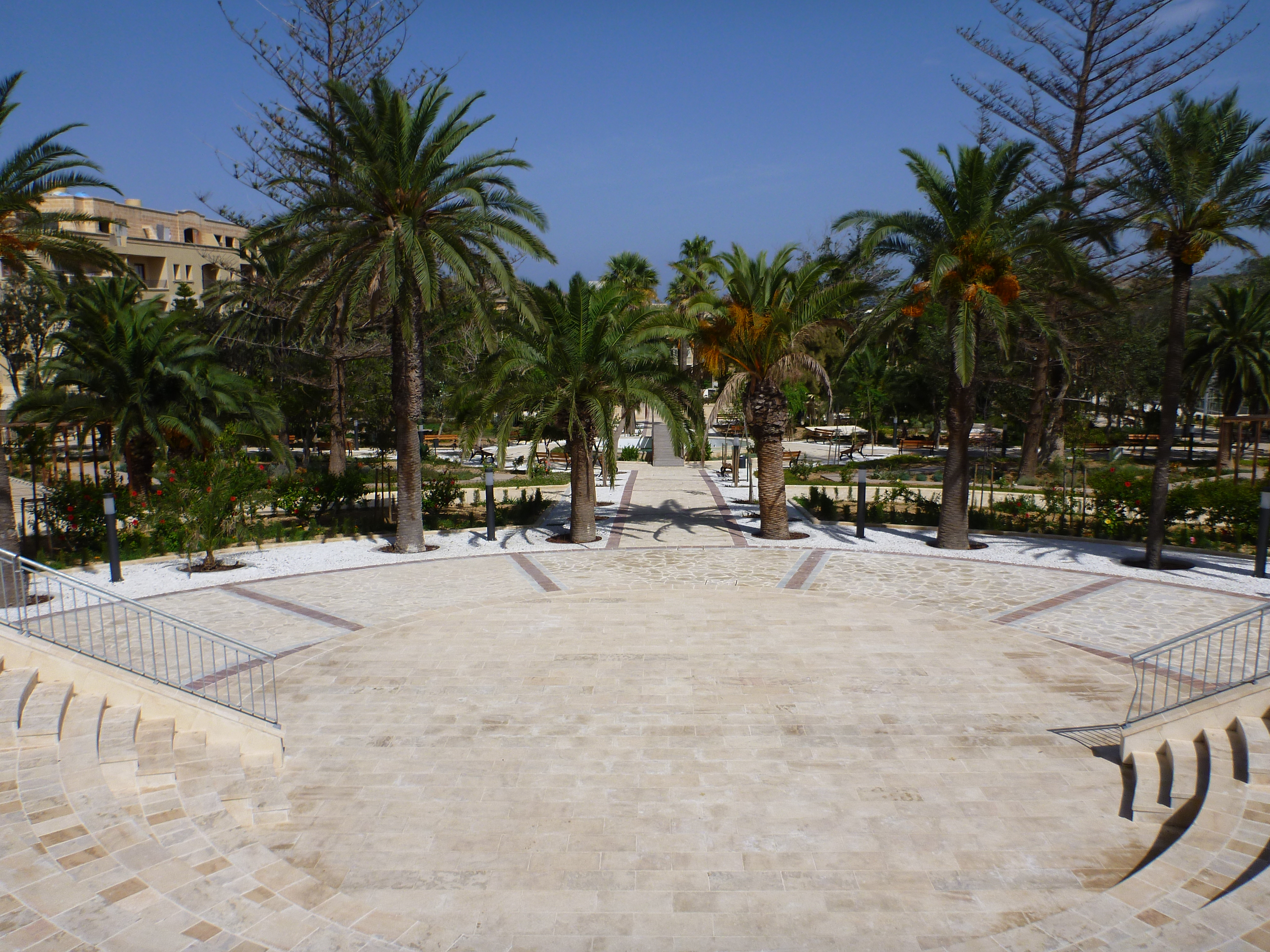
View of the Villa Rundle Garden

Villa Rundle Garden is a garden located in the lower part of Republic Street, Victoria, Gozo, Malta. The garden was planted by, and named, after the British General Leslie Rundle around 1915, and has a variety of native and imported trees, such as Ficus nitida and Canary palms. The trees give visitors a shade from the sun.
