= Newwiela Point =

Southernmost part of Gozo

Newwiela Point Ras in-newwiela (Maltese)
- Cape
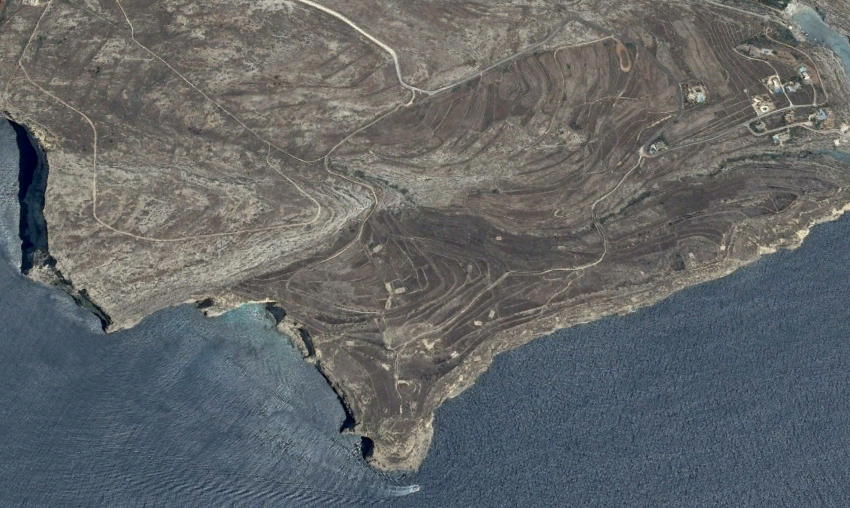
- Newwiela Point from a satellite image.

- Coordinates: 36°0′44″N 14°15′41″E
- Location: Gozo, Malta
- Offshore water bodies: Mediterranean Sea
- Elevation: 45 m (148 ft)
- Highest elevation: 213 feet (65 m)

Newwiela Point (Maltese: Ras in-newwiela) is a geographical cape located on the southern coast of Gozo, the second largest island of Malta. It is the southernmost point of the whole island. It is commonly known as one of the largest dive sites in the island with its average depth being around 30 meters. The cape is largely flat but is surrounding with a steep drop-off. Two caves may also be found within the surrounding cliffs.
