= Gozo Museum of Archaeology =

Coordinates: 36°2′45″N 14°14′22.5″E

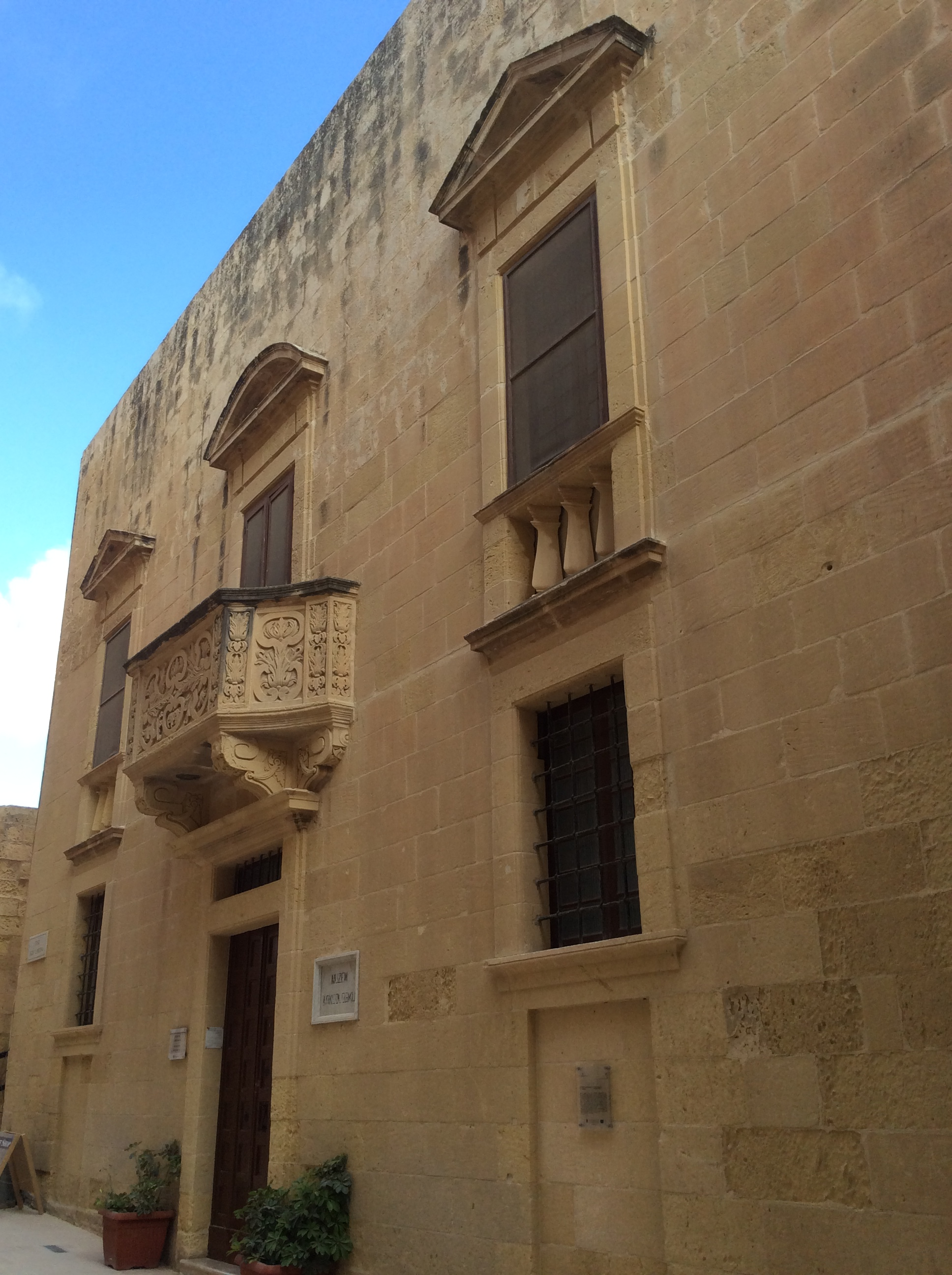
Casa Bondi, which houses the Gozo Museum of Archaeology

The Gozo Museum of Archaeology (Maltese: Il-Mużew tal-Arkeoloġija ta' Għawdex) is a museum in the Cittadella, the oldest part of the city, of Victoria in Gozo, Malta. The museum of Archaeology was opened in 1960 as the first public museum in Gozo and was known as the Gozo Museum. The museum was redesigned and reopened in 1986 as the Archaeology Museum of Gozo. Today it is known as the Gozo Museum of Archaeology or the National Museum of Archaeology. The museum features archaeological artifacts and relics and displays covering the cultural history of the Island of Gozo from the prehistoric era to the early modern period. Its exhibits include the Maymūnah Stone.

The museum is housed in a 17th-century house which was originally known as Casa Bondi. It was sold to the Government by the Bondi family in 1937. It is a two-storey building with a symmetrical austere façade, with a carved stone balcony above the front door. The building is listed on the National Inventory of the Cultural Property of the Maltese Islands.

== See also ==
- List of museums in Malta
