= List of museums in Malta =

This is a list of museums in Malta.

- Abbatija Tad-Dejr
- Bir Mula Heritage
- Borġ in-Nadur
- Casa Rocca Piccola
- Domvs Romana
- Fort Rinella
- Fortifications Interpretation Centre
- Ġgantija
- Għar Dalam
- Gozo Museum of Archaeology
- Gran Castello Historic House
- Ħaġar Qim
- Ħal Saflieni Hypogeum
- Lascaris War Rooms
- Malta at War Museum
- Malta Classic Car Museum
- Malta Aviation Museum
- Malta Maritime Museum
- Malta Postal Museum
- Mdina Cathedral Museum
- Mnajdra Temples
- MUŻA
- National Museum of Archaeology
- National Museum of Ethnography
- National Museum of Natural History
- National War Museum
- Natural Science Museum
- Old Prison
- Palace Armoury
- Palazzo Falson
- Police Museum
- Saluting Battery
- Skorba Temples
- St. Paul's Catacombs
- Ta' Ħaġrat Temples
- Ta' Kola Windmill
- Tarxien Temples
- The State Rooms
- Tunnara Museum
- Wignacourt Museum
- Wignacourt Tower
- Żabbar Sanctuary Museum

== See also ==
- List of museums
- History of Malta
- Tourism in Malta
- Culture of Malta
