= Gozo Aqueduct =

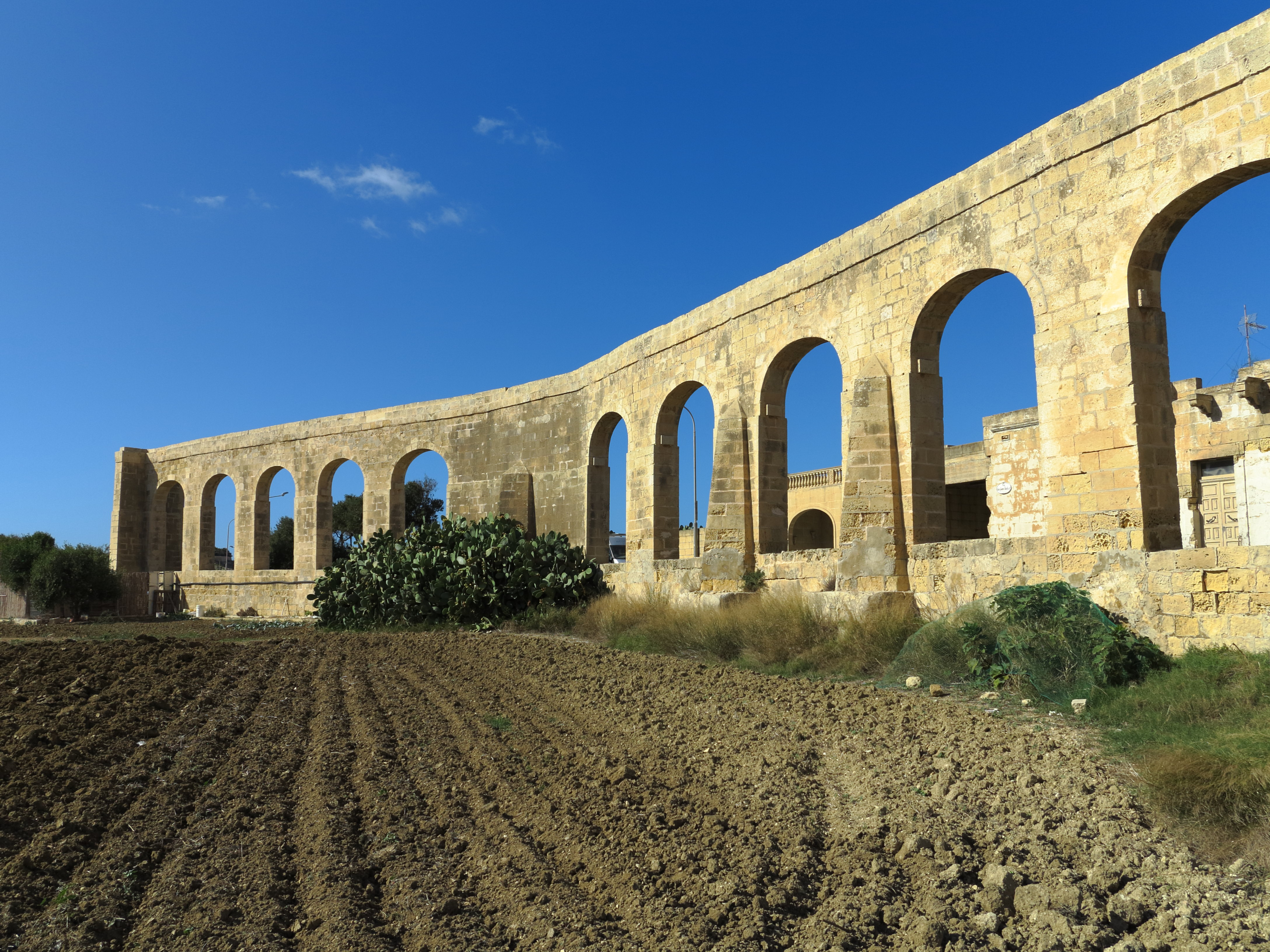
- A surviving section of the Gozo Aqueduct in Victoria
- Coordinates: 36°2′56.5″N 14°13′38.4″E
- Begins: Kerċem
- Ends: Victoria

History
- Construction start: 1839
- Opened: 1843

Location
- Interactive map of Gozo Aqueduct

The Gozo Aqueduct is an aqueduct on the island of Gozo, Malta. It was built by the British between 1839 and 1843 to transport water from Għar Ilma in the limits of Kerċem to Victoria. A reservoir was built within the ditch of the Cittadella to store water which most probably stored water coming from the Cittadella itself. An obelisk was built near the reservoirs to commemorate the opening of the aqueduct.

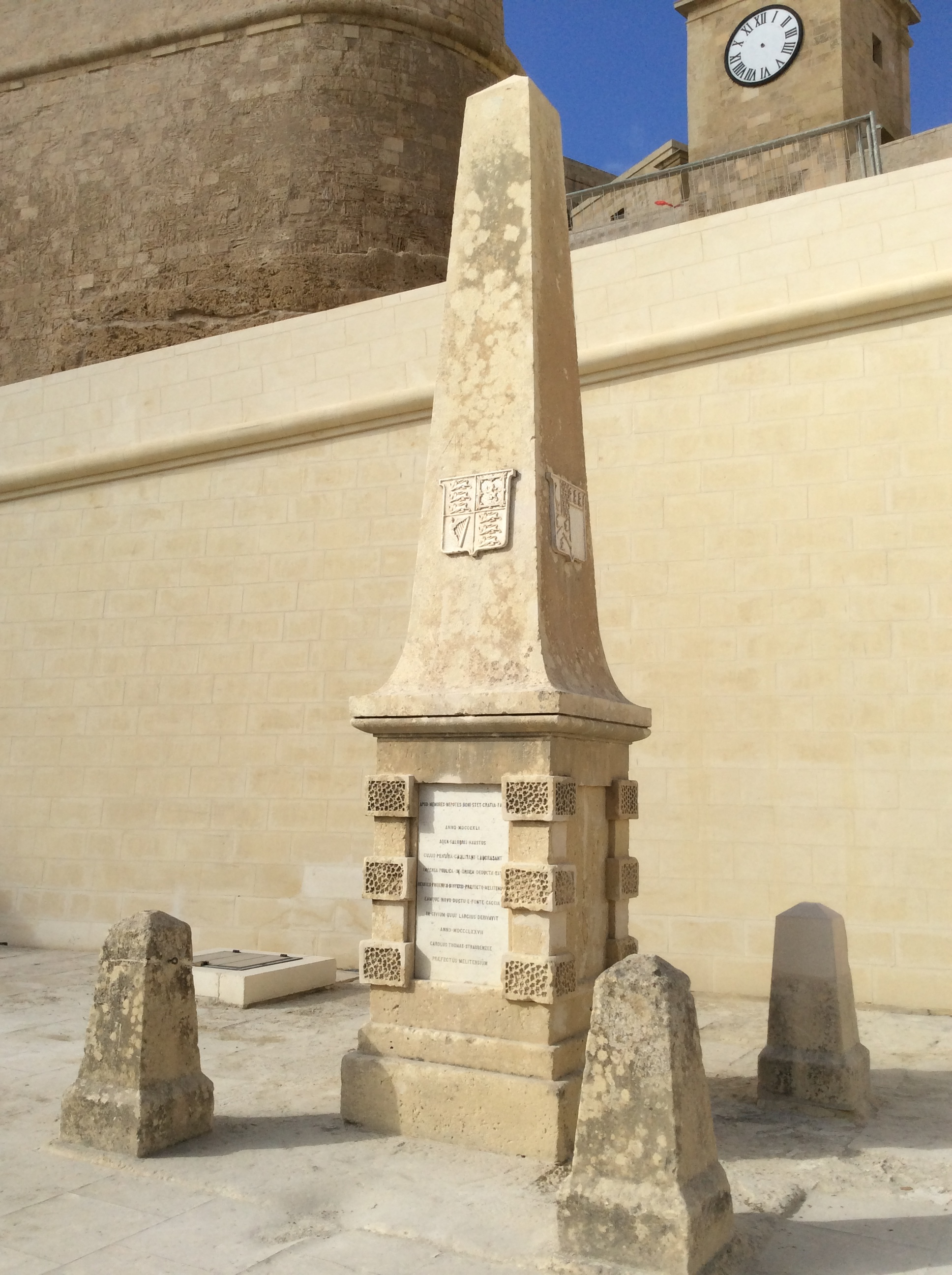
Commemorative obelisk

The aqueduct fell into a state of disrepair after it was replaced by a system of pipes and electrical pumps. Large sections of it were lost in a series of collapses, the latest of which occurred during a storm in the 1980s. Despite this, significant portions of the aqueduct's arches still stand, and they are regarded to have value as a ruin.

In 2019, it was reported that the Ministry for Gozo had plans to reconstruct the entire aqueduct, a project which would have involved the dismantling of the surviving arches. The project's planning application was suspended after opposition by the Superintendence for Cultural Heritage and the Environment and Resources Authority.

== See also ==
- Wignacourt Aqueduct
