= Malta Aviation Museum =

Aerospace museum in Ta'Qali, Malta

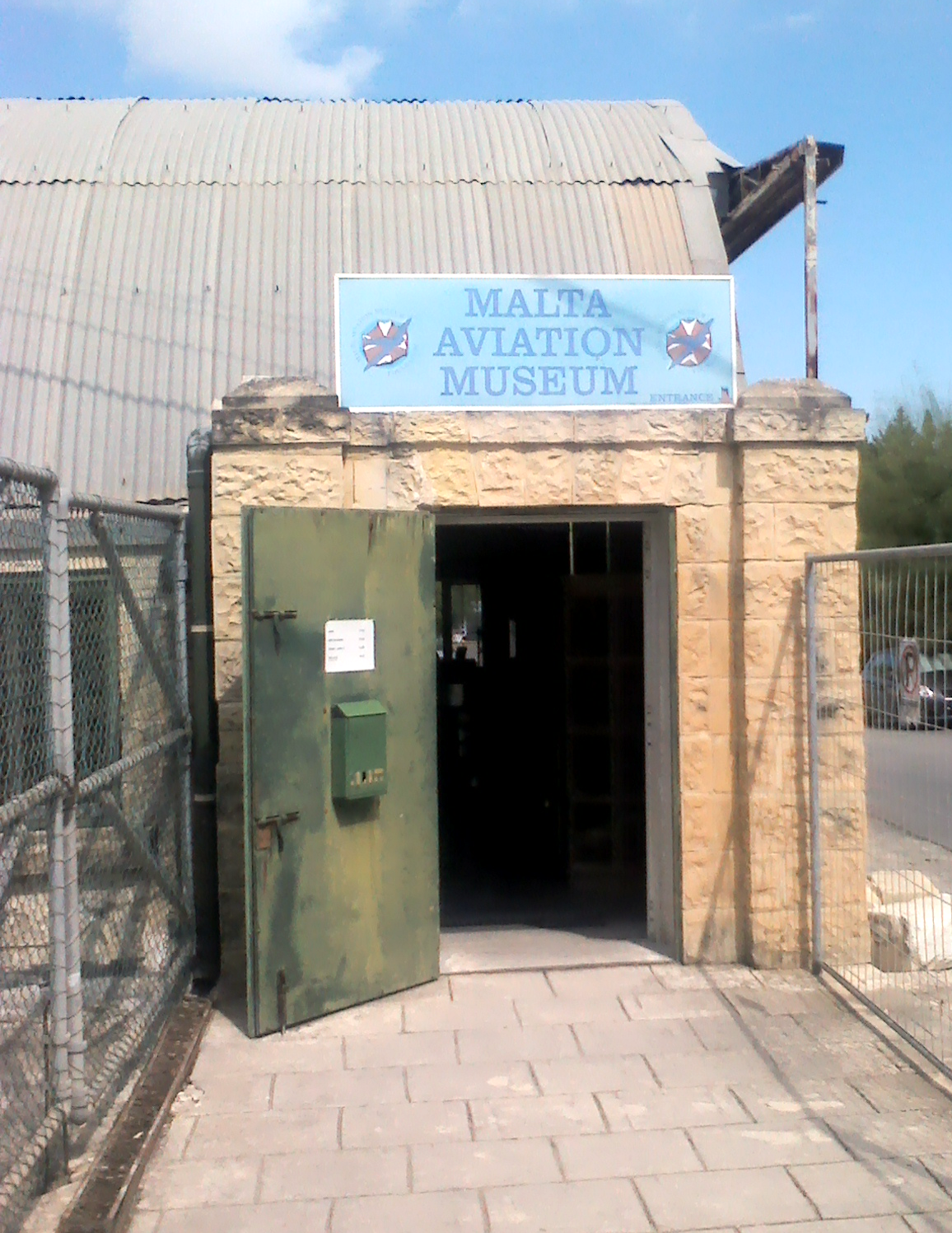
- Malta Aviation Museum entrance (2015)
- Established: 1994
- Location: Ta'Qali, Malta
- Coordinates: 35.8935°N 14.4162°E
- Director: Ray Polidano
- Website: http://www.maltaaviationmuseum.com

Malta Aviation Museum is an aircraft museum situated on the site of the former Royal Air Force airfield RAF Ta Kali in the village of Ta'Qali, on the island of Malta. The museum, based in three hangars, covers the history of aviation on the island with exhibits, particularly from the Second World War and post-war periods. The museum is involved in the preservation and restoration of aircraft, some of which are in airworthy condition.

The museum received two Romney huts from the former RAF Luqa in 2003. In 2021, a new Main Exhibition Hangar was funded by the EU.

== List of exhibits ==
=== Main Exhibition Hangar ===
Exhibits include

- Gloster Meteor F8 and NF14
- Douglas Dakota
- Cessna Birddog
- North American Texan
- Piper Cub
- Fiat G.91
- English Electric Lightning Cockpit
- Agusta-Bell 47G helicopter
- Agusta-Bell AB 212 helicopter

=== Air Battle of Malta Memorial Hangar ===
This hangar, purpose-built and opened in 2005, features airframes from the Second World War period, several examples restored from casualties of the Battle of Malta.

- de Havilland Tiger Moth
- Hawker Hurricane IIa Z3055
- Supermarine Spitfire IX (EN199)
- Fairey Swordfish (fuselage skeleton)
- Reggiane Re.2001 Falco II (Wreckage - Only aircraft of the type in existence today)

=== Romney Exhibition Hangar ===
The space, which includes the museum entrance and restoration workshop, has exhibits including:

- de Havilland Vampire T.11
- Link Trainer
- Hawker Sea Hawk

== Gallery ==
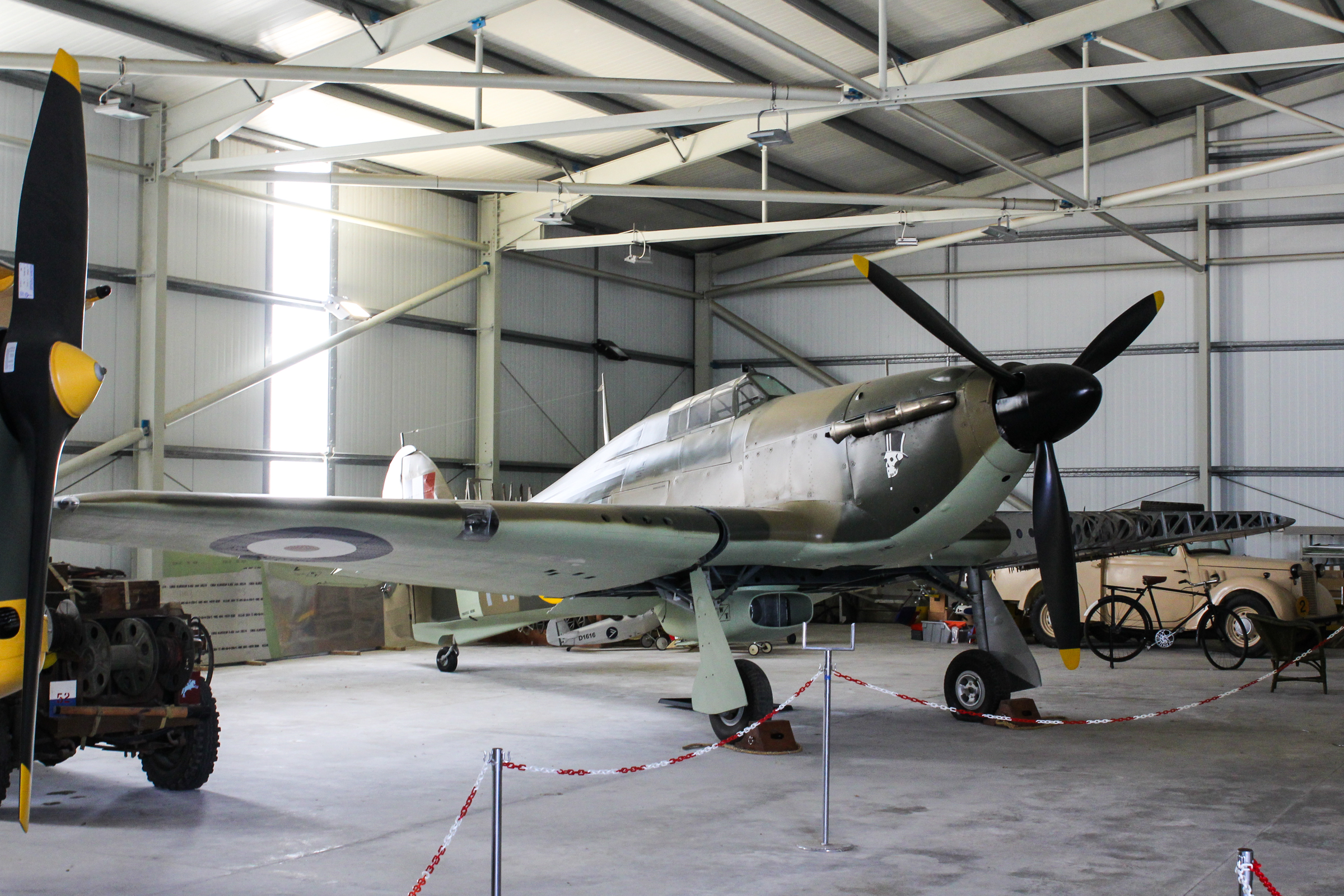
Hawker Hurricane Z3055

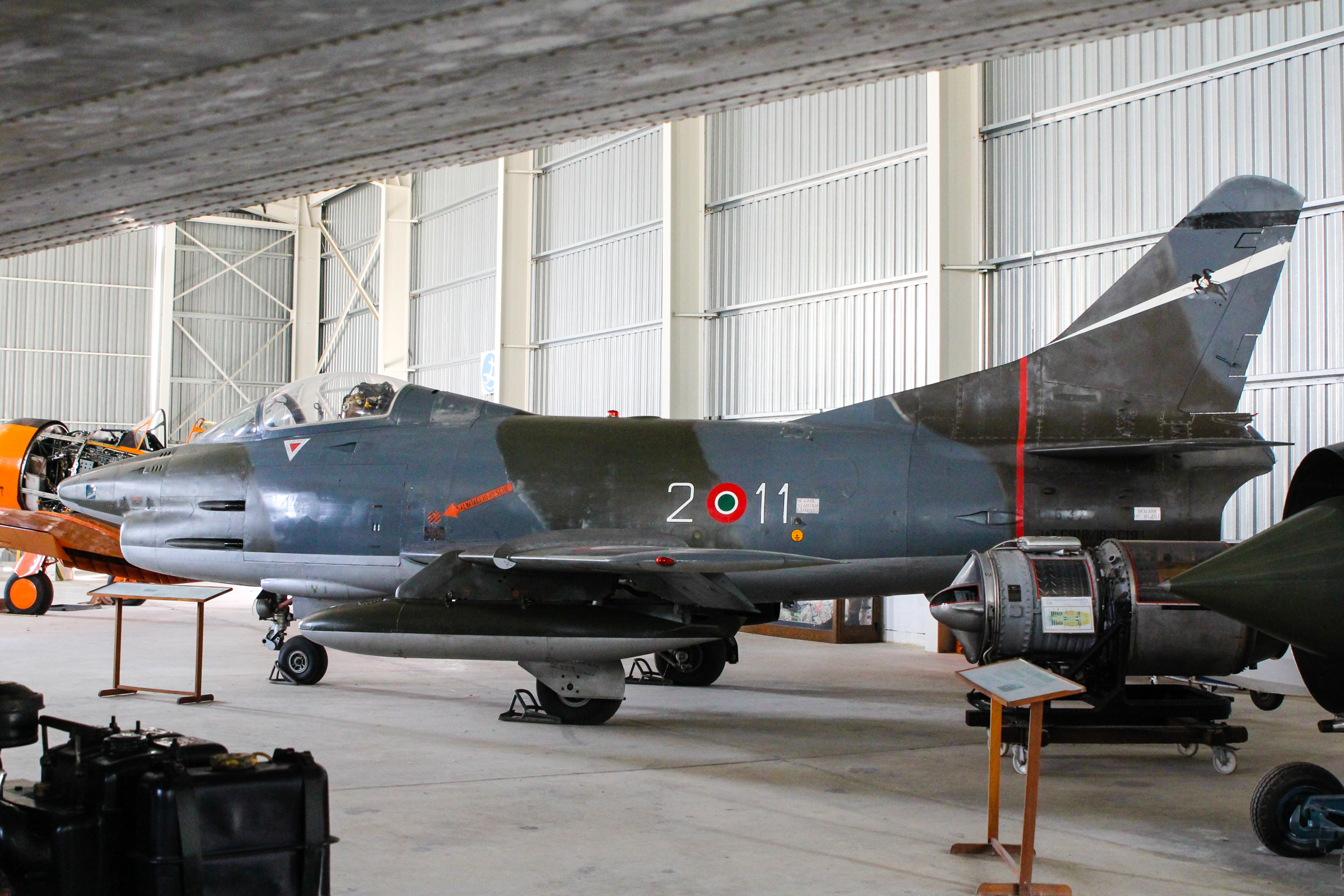
Fiat G.91R/1B

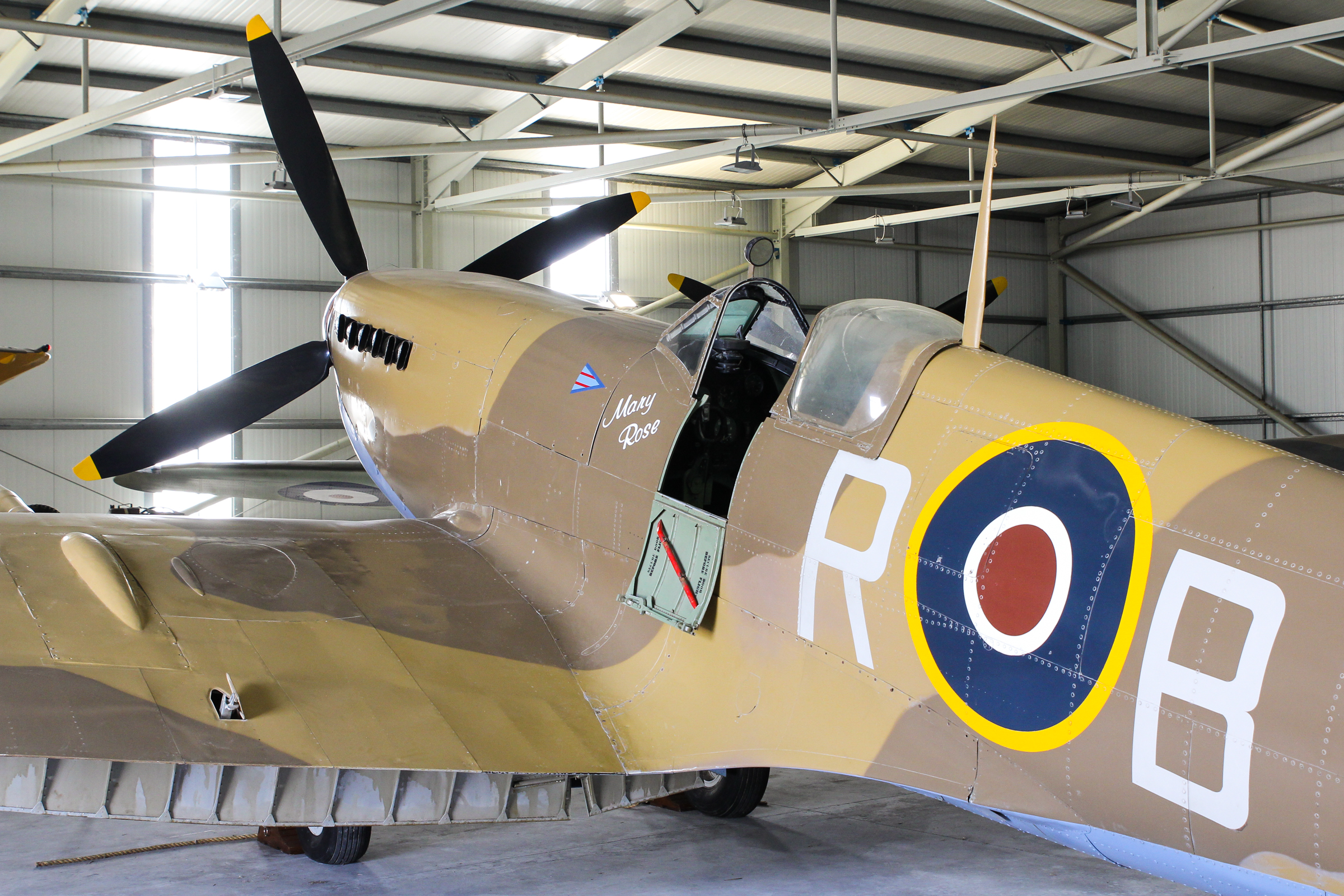
Supermarine Spitfire F Mk.IXe EN199

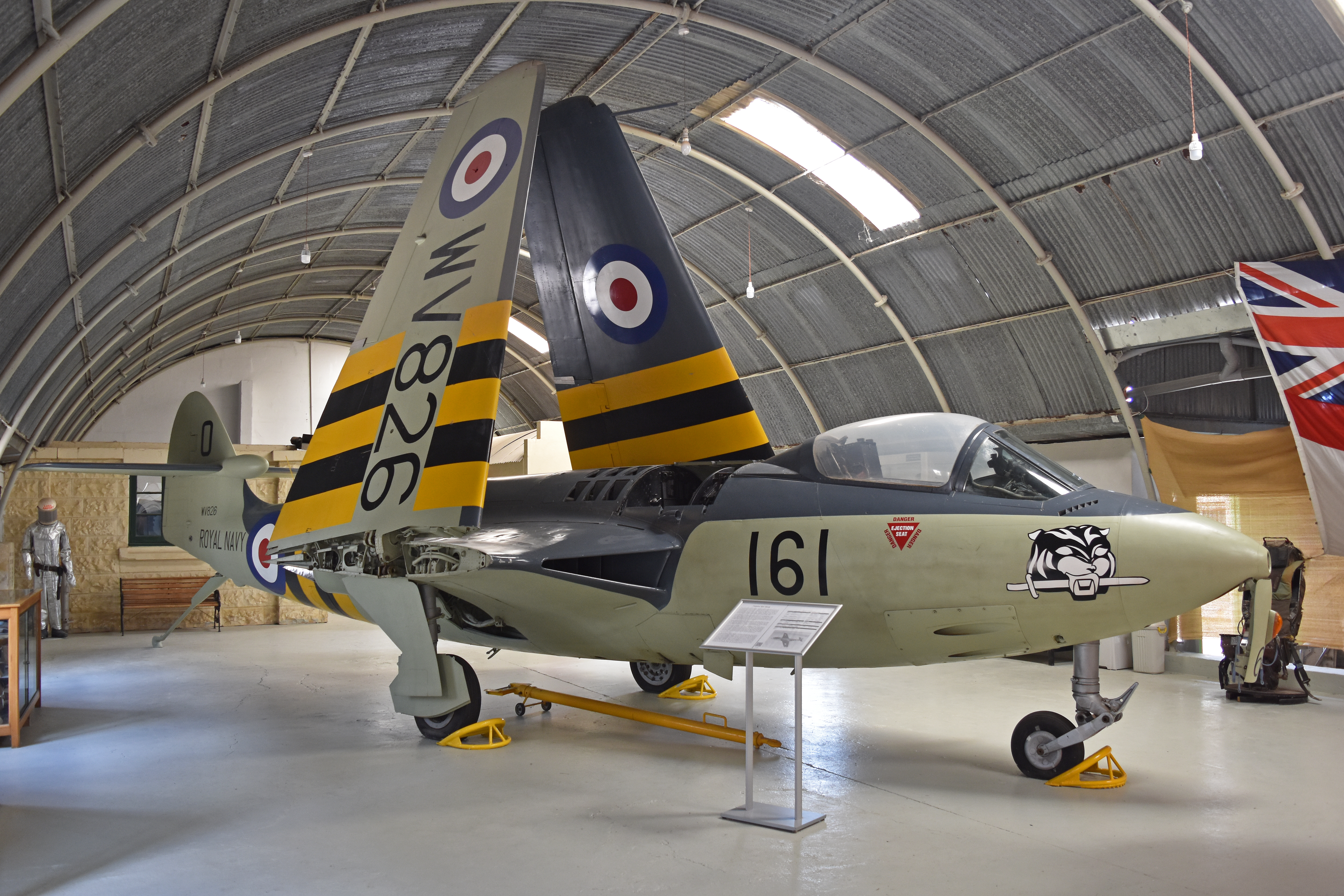
Hawker Sea Hawk FGA.6 WV826

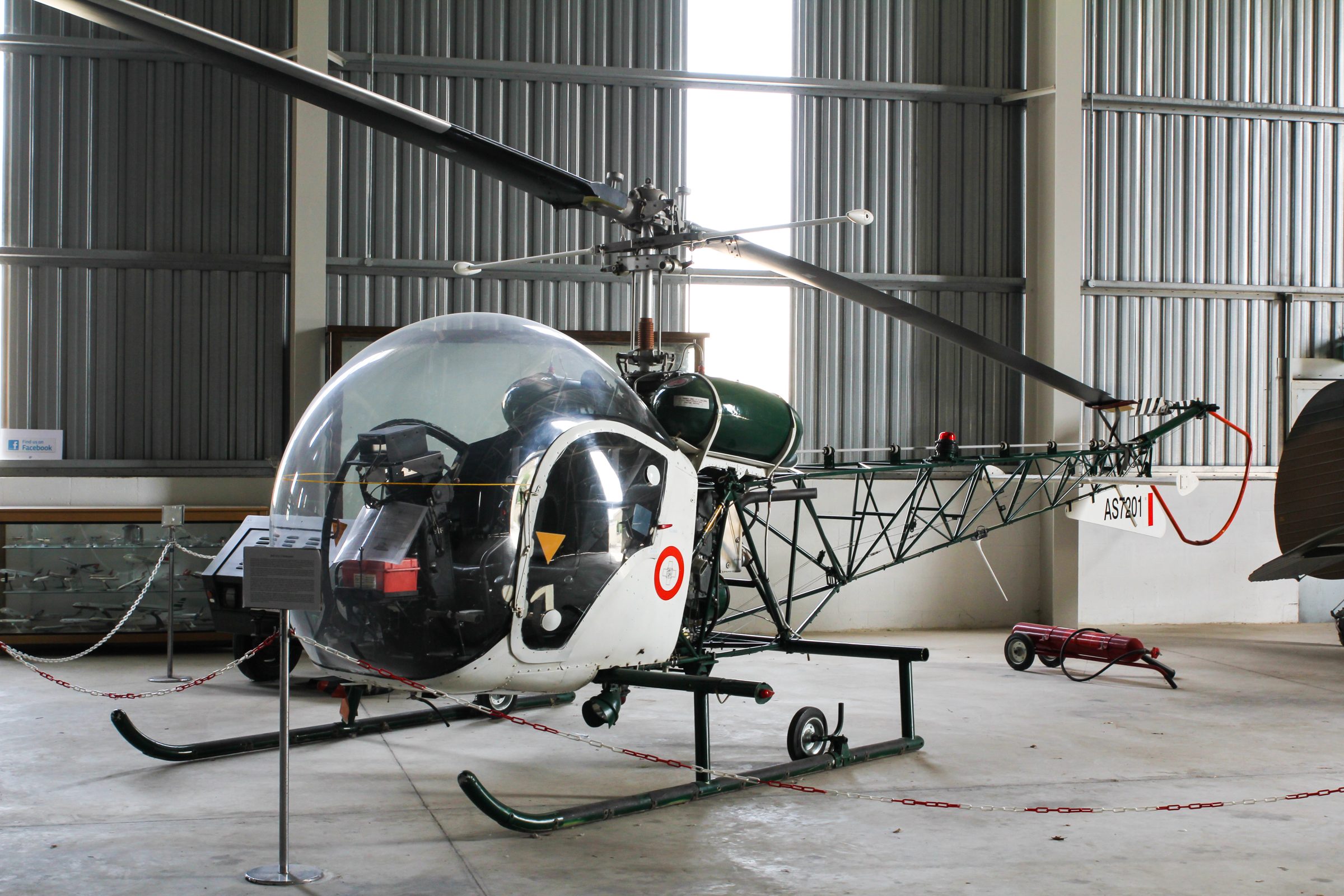
Armed Forces of Malta Agusta Bell 47G-2 AS7201

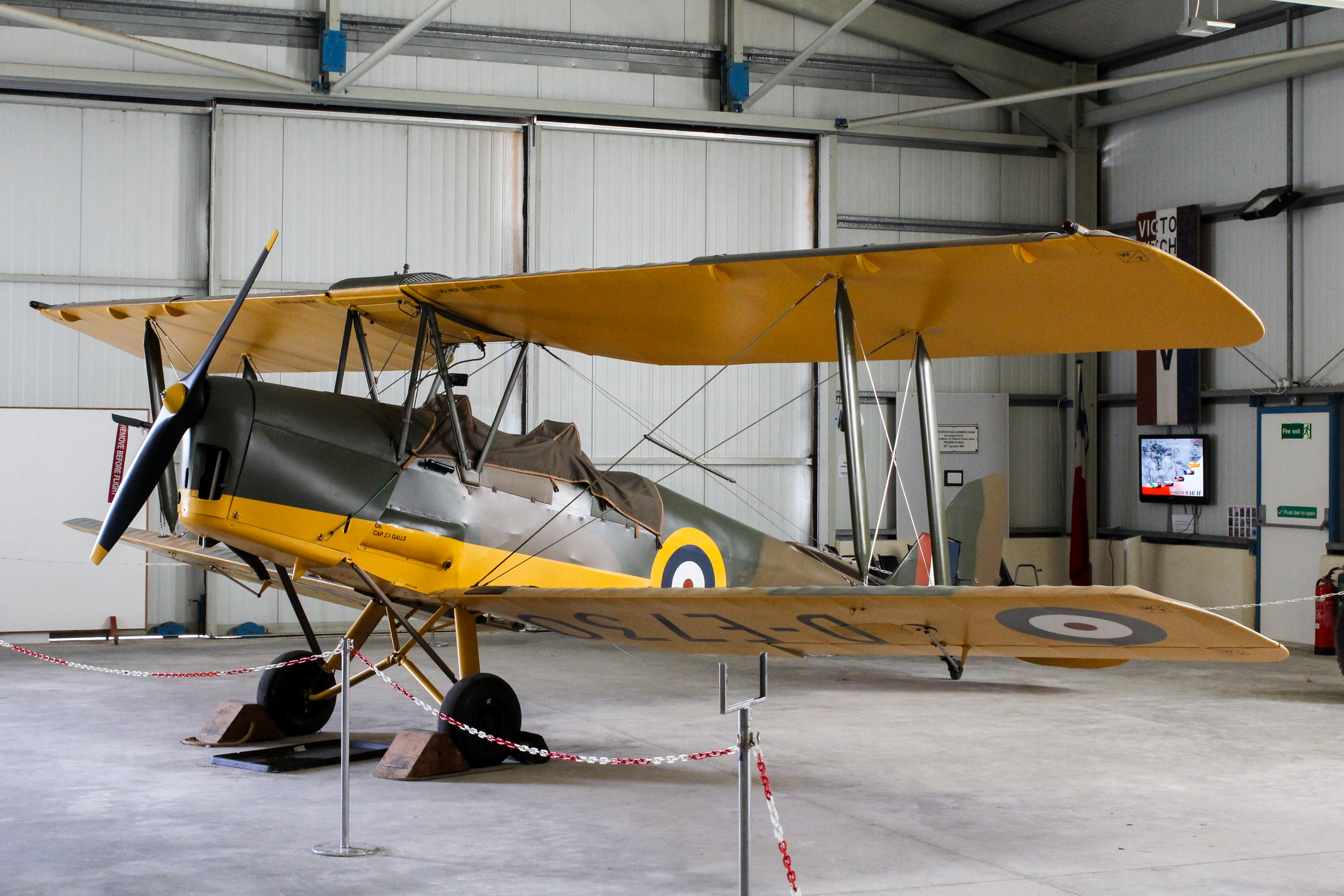
de Havilland DH 82A Tiger Moth

== See also ==
- List of museums in Malta
- List of aerospace museums

== Bibliography ==
- Ogden, Bob. Aviation Museums and Collections of Mainland Europe. 2006. Air-Britain (Historians) Limited. Tonbridge, Kent. ISBN 0-85130-375-7.
