= Malta at War Museum =

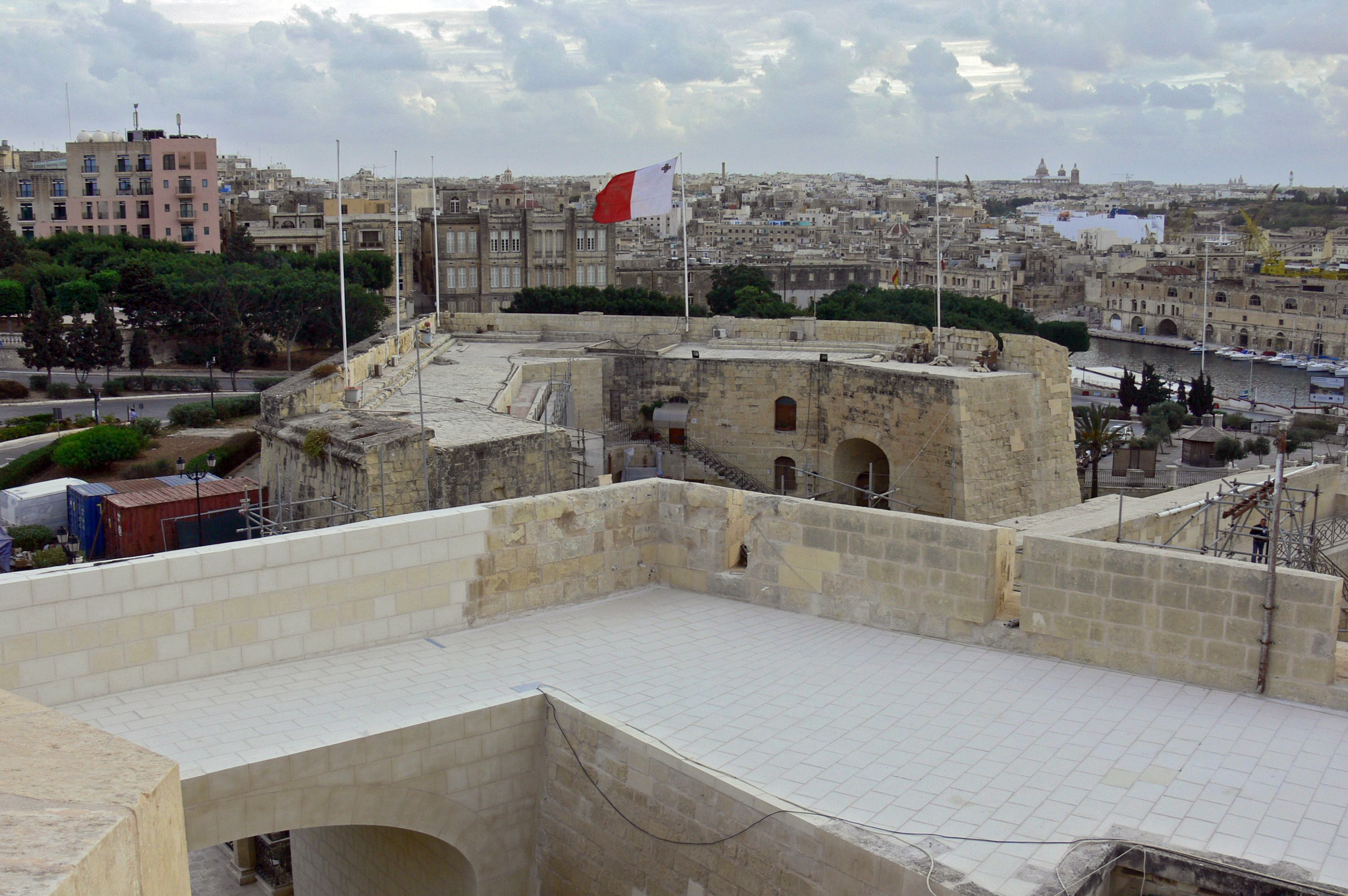
- Couvre Porte Counterguard
- Location: Birgu, Malta
- Coordinates: 35°53′7.5″N 14°31′21.6″E
- Type: War museum
- Owner: Fondazzjoni Wirt Artna
- Website: www.maltaatwarmuseum.com

The Malta at War Museum is a museum in Birgu, Malta, which is dedicated to Malta's role in World War II. The museum is housed within a barrack block and a rock-hewn air-raid shelter within Couvre Porte Counterguard.

== Location ==
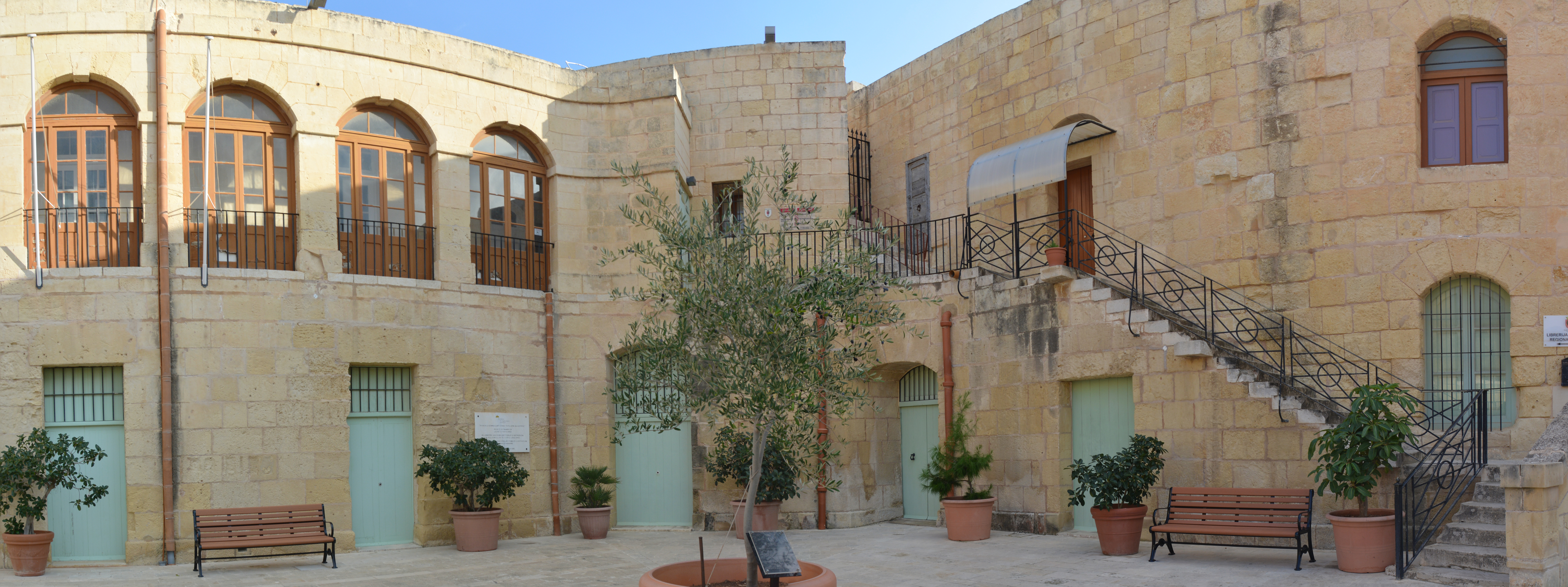
Inside of the courtyard of the counterguard, next of the Museum entrance

The museum is housed within the Couvre Porte, a 17th-century counterguard forming part of the fortifications of Birgu. In the 18th century, casemates were built within the counterguard, and these were later converted into the barracks. During World War II, the barracks were used as a police headquarters, and later as a civil defence centre. At this point, air-raid shelters for the population of Birgu were dug in the rocks beneath the counterguard. Today, the barracks and shelters all form part of the museum.

== Collections ==
The Malta at War Museum's collection consists of memorabilia such as weapons, uniforms, medals, documents and other items. It also features original film footage of the war, such as the 1943 propaganda film Malta G.C.

The museum was renovated and enlarged between September 2011 and April 2012. It is currently open to visitors from Monday to Saturday.

== See also ==
- List of museums in Malta
