= National Museum of Natural History, Malta =

National Museum of Natural History
- Mużew Nazzjonali tal-Istorja Naturali
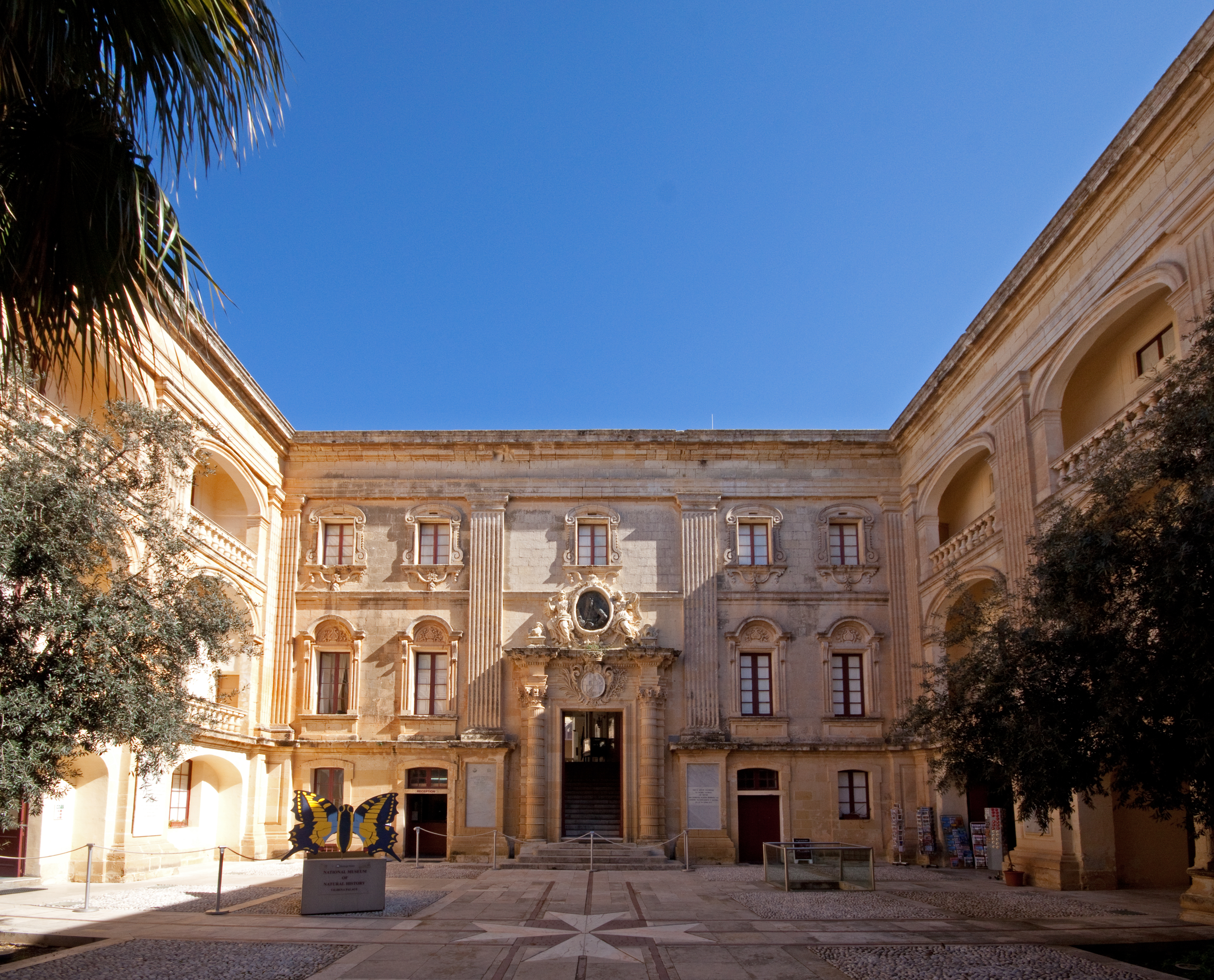
- The courtyard of Palazzo Vilhena, which houses the museum
- Established: 22 June 1973
- Location: Palazzo Vilhena, Mdina, Malta
- Coordinates: 35.885°N 14.4037°E
- Type: natural history museum

The National Museum of Natural History (Maltese: Mużew Nazzjonali tal-Istorja Naturali) is a natural history museum in the mediaeval walled city of Mdina, Malta. It is housed in Palazzo Vilhena, a French Baroque palace rebuilt in 1726 by Grand Master Antonio Manoel de Vilhena to designs of Charles François de Mondion. The museum opened to the public in 1973, and is run by Heritage Malta.

The museum gives the visitor an overview of Maltese ecosystems (both on ground and under water), focusing on endemic plants and birds of the Islands, such as the Maltese Centaury and Blue Rock Thrush.

This museum display ranks a large variety of minerals, fossils, insects, reptiles, birds, mammals, fish and sections about Geology and Palaeontology.

== Apollo 17 Goodwill Moon Rock ==
On Tuesday May 18, 2004, Malta's Apollo 17 Goodwill Moon rock was stolen from the Museum. According to an Associated Press story the Moon rock has a value of 5 million dollars (U.S), making it one of the largest valued thefts in Malta's history. The Moon rock has not been recovered.

== See also ==
- List of museums in Malta
