= Gran Castello Historic House =

Coordinates: 36°2′47.5″N 14°14′23.3″E

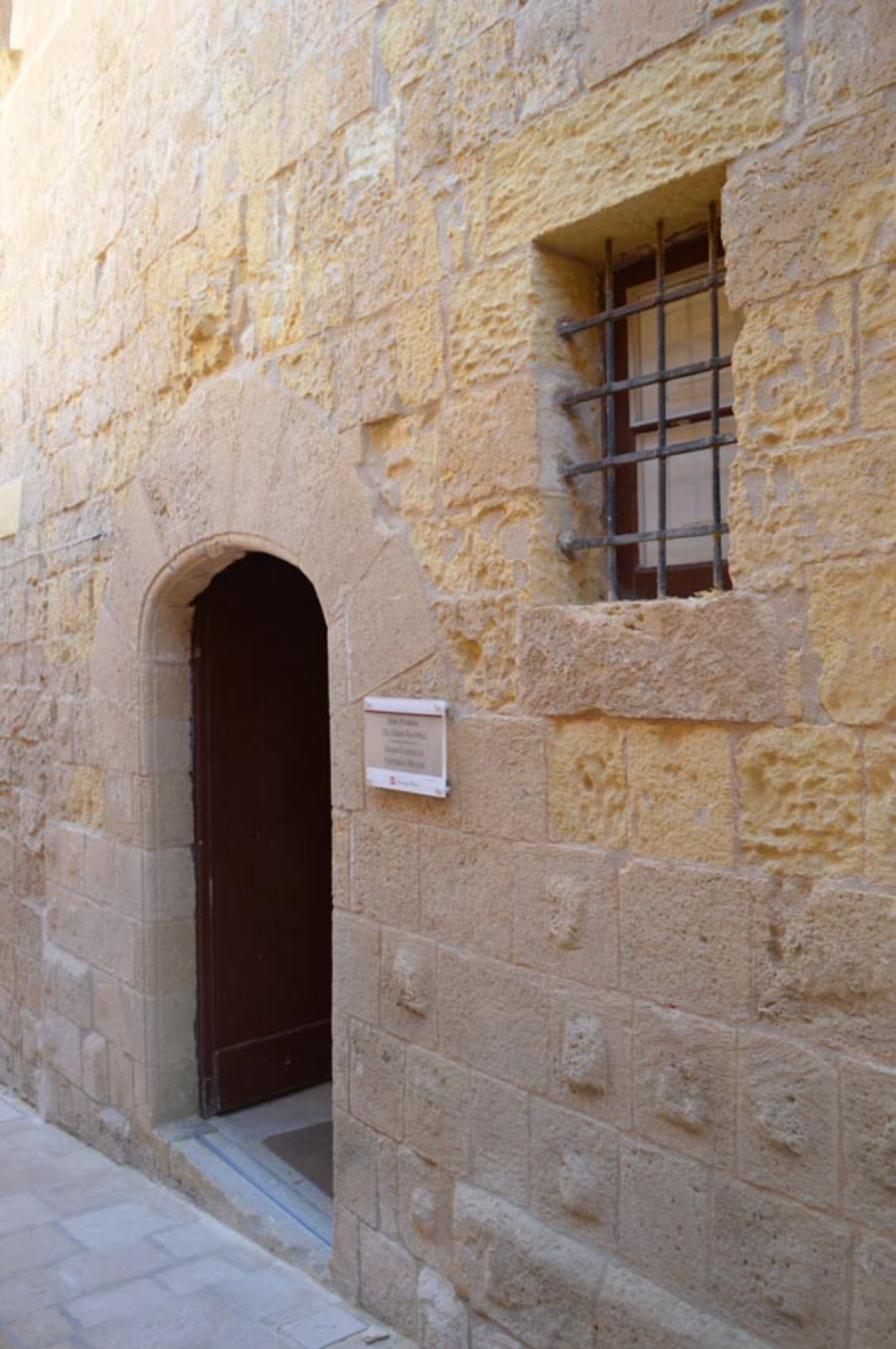
Entrance to Gran Castello Historic House

The Gran Castello Historic House (Maltese: Dar Storika tal-Gran Kastell), formerly known as the Folklore Museum, is a historic house museum dedicated to Gozitan folklore in Victoria, Gozo, Malta. It is located within a cluster of 16th-century houses in the Cittadella, the oldest part of the city of Victoria; the houses were rehabilitated as a museum in 1983.

The museum's collections relate to the domestic, rural and traditional ways of life in the agrarian economy of the Maltese Islands and the many skills, crafts and traditions that have shaped everyday life on the islands over the centuries.

The architectural features of the buildings housing the museum are in Sicilian style, and may owe something to the influence of the Chiaramonte family of Sicily and southern Italy when they were Counts of Malta in the late 14th century. Delicate baroque façades countervail the relative plainness of the interiors.

It was renamed from Folklore Museum to Gran Castello Historic House museum in 2016, during the restoration of the Cittadella.

== See also ==
- List of museums in Malta
