= Old Prison (Victoria) =

Coordinates: 36°2′46.4″N 14°14′21.1″E

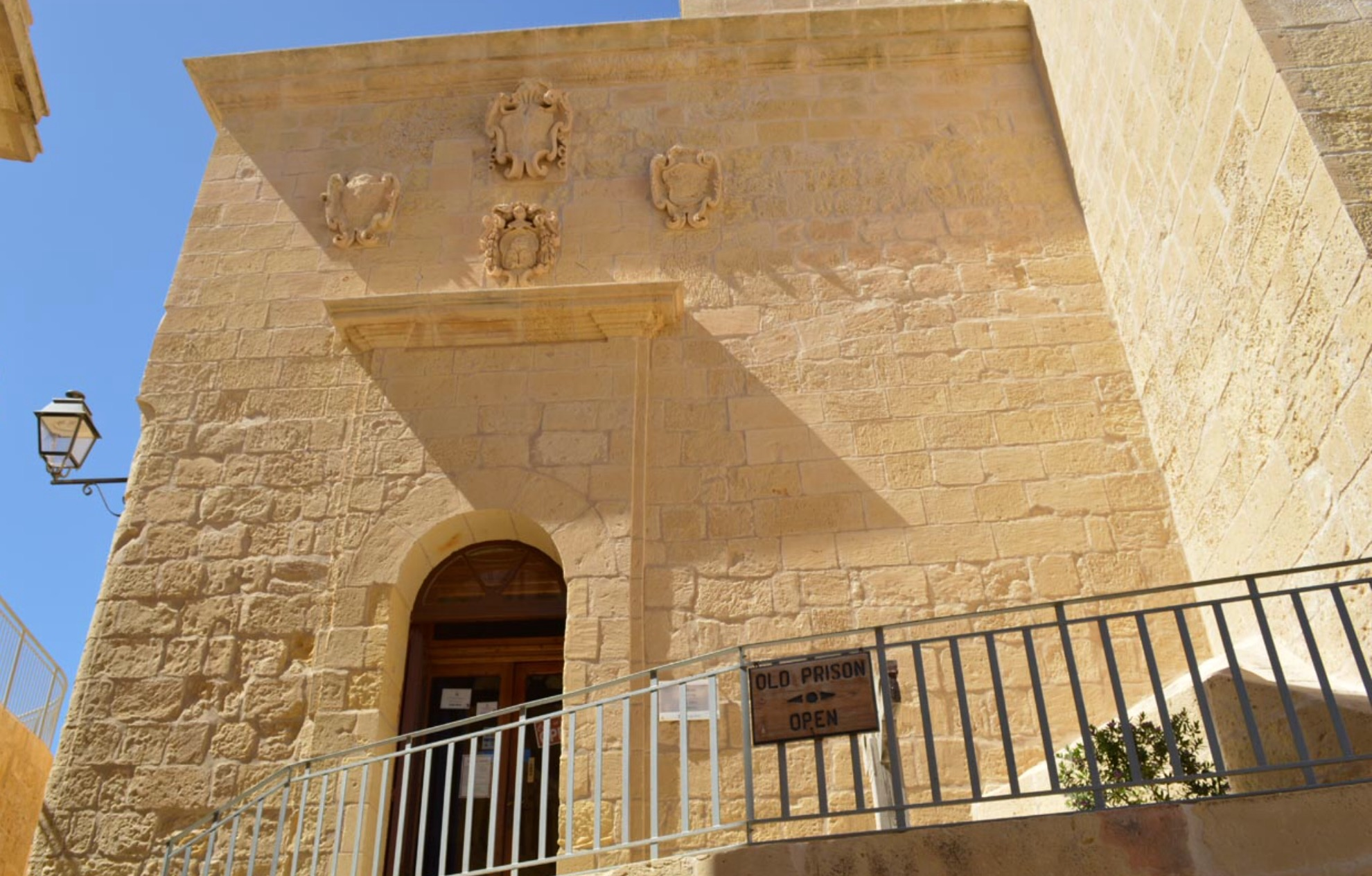
Old Prison

The Old Prison is located in the Citadella of Victoria, Gozo, adjacent to the Courts of Justice to which it was originally connected. Today, the prison complex is divided into two different buildings: the entrance hall, which had been a common cell in the 19th century, and a free-standing block with six individual cells.

The prison was active from the mid-16th century until 1962.

First, it used to host the rowdiest or most riotous knights, as a place to cool down. Its most notable knight imprisoned there was Fra Jean Parisot de Valette who was imprisoned there for four months in 1538 after attacking a man.

The site is well preserved in its original state, and a large amount of graffiti is etched into the limestone walls. Representations are often of ships, hand-prints, crosses, names, dates, games, and anthropomorphic figures.

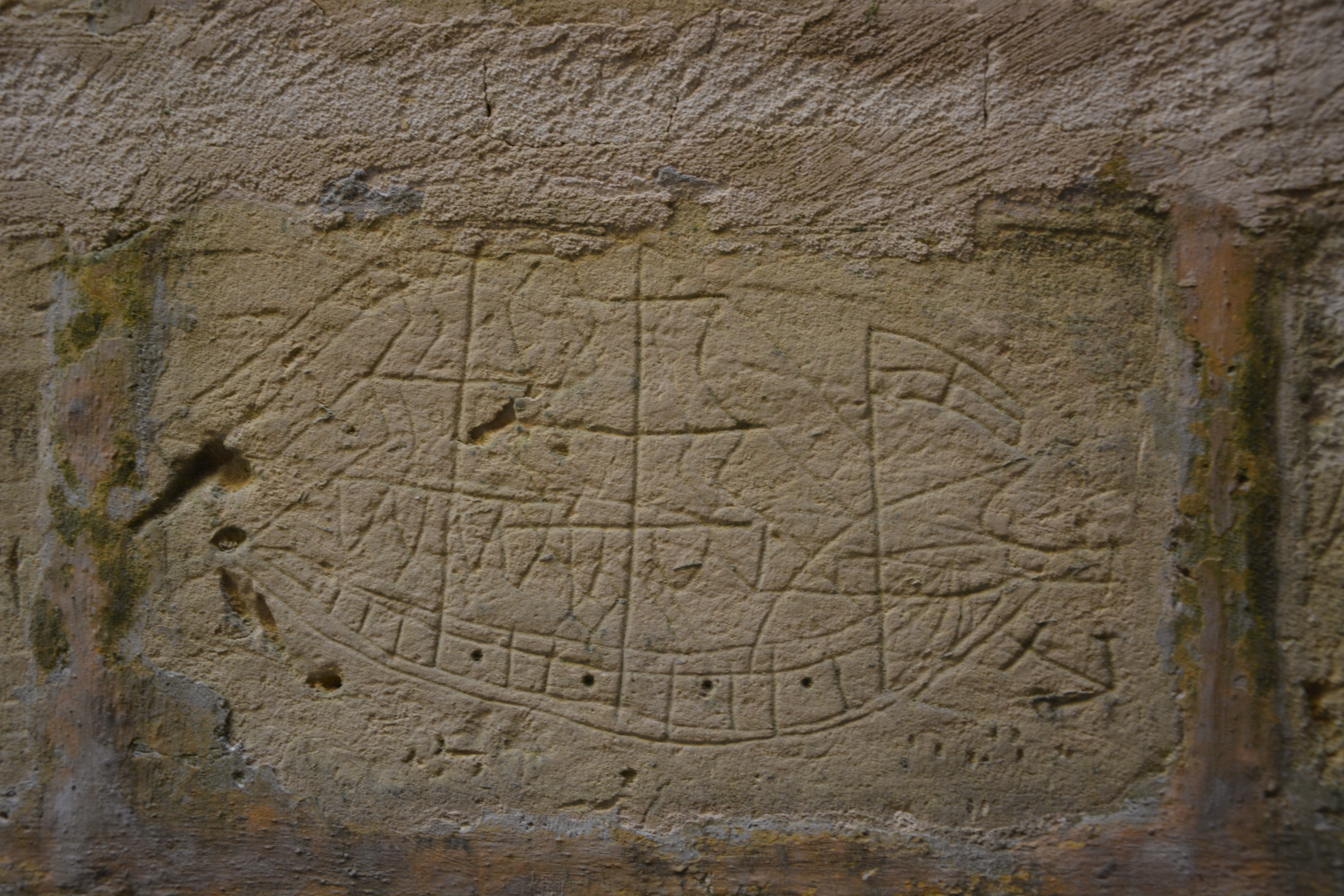
Graffiti etched into the walls by the prisoners

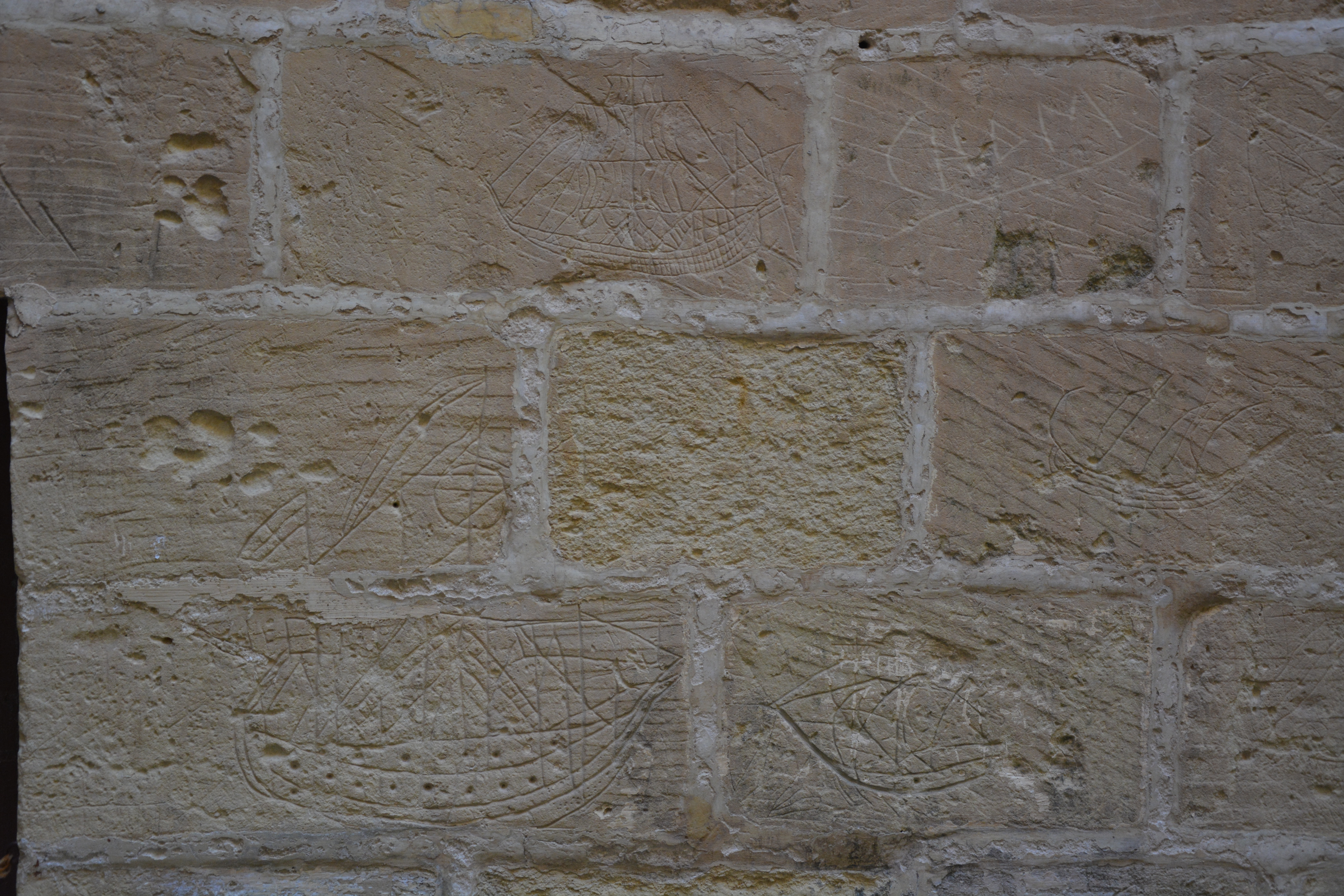
Graffiti etched into the walls by the prisoners
