= Byzantine Malta =

Period of Maltese history from 535 CE to 870 CE

Malta (Ancient Greek: Μελέτης, Melétēs) was ruled by the Byzantine Empire, from the time of the Byzantine conquest of Sicily in 535–6 to 869–870, when the islands were occupied by Arabs. Evidence for the three centuries of Byzantine rule in Malta is very limited, and at times ambiguous. Historians theorise that Byzantine Malta was exposed to the same phenomena affecting the Central Mediterranean, namely a considerable influx of Greek settlers and Hellenic culture, administrative changes brought about by the reorganisation of Sicily along the lines of a Byzantine theme, and significant naval activity in the Mediterranean following the rise of Islam.

Byzantine sources are scant on the Maltese islands, although a handful of records group them together as the Gaudomelete (Γαυδομελέτη, Gaudomelétē), a term that first appears in the pseudoepigraphical Acts of Peter and Paul. The islands were a place of relegation and exile. With Muslim expansion in North Africa, Malta shifted from a military base and trade post linking Sicily and the other Byzantine possessions in the Italian Peninsula to the Exarchate of Africa, to an outlying satellite and guardpost of the Byzantine Theme of Sicily.

Historians have concluded that Malta played a limited strategic role in the Byzantine Empire. The subsequent Arab conquest led to a complete break between the Byzantine era and later periods. While there are studies about alleged Byzantine or Christian survival, the sparseness of evidence implies a weak case for a lasting Byzantine legacy in Malta.

== Background ==
The earliest mentions of Malta in this era are scant, and usually inferred in passages relating to Sicily. In a passage by Victor Vitensis, Bishop of Vita, historians infer that towards the end of the fifth century, the Maltese islands were conquered by Vandals from their Kingdom in North Africa, and then handed to Odoacre, the Ostrogothic king of Italy. (Note: "Post cuius (sc. Valentiniani), mortem totius Africae ambitum obtinuit (Geisericus), nec non et insulas maximas Sardiniam, Siciliam, Corsicam, Ebusum, Maioricam, Minoricam vel alias multa superbia sibi consueta defendit. Quarum unam illarum id est Siciliam Oduacro Italiae regi postmodum tributario iure concessit; ex qua eis Oduacar singulis quibusque temporibus ut dominis tributa dependit, aliquam tamen sibi reservantibus partem." - Victor Vitensis, Historia Persecutionis Africae Provinciae.) Historians theorise that Malta remained in Vandal hands from around 455 to 476, and then granted to Odoacre as tribute, before passing on to Theodoric after this defeat of Odoacre in 493. (Note: Amari erroneously associates a donation of property worth 200 solidi by Odoacre in 489 AD with Malta. However, the text of the donation appears quite clearly to refer to the Dalmatian island of Meleda, the modern Mljet.)

There is no evidence of a Bishop of Malta before 553, with no record appearing of a Maltese bishop attending any council in Vandal Africa. However, as no episcopal lists survive from Africa, historians are unable to assess whether Malta had a bishop or whether the islands formed part of the African church at this early stage.

Malta suffers from a lack of attention in Byzantine sources, translating into a long-lasting perception amongst historians that the archipelago lay at the margins of the strategic, political and military interests of the Byzantine Empire. This view was only overturned in recent years, following advances in Maltese archaeology. Analysis of ceramics found that the Byzantines still sent navies into the Western Mediterranean well into the 9th century – confirming that Malta was a strategic stepping stone in the defence system around North Africa, Sicily and the Balearics. Although occasionally raided by Arabs naval forces, Malta – together with Sardinia and the Balearics - provided the Byzantines with a good strategic base in the central and western Mediterranean, enabling them to maintain an economic and military presence.

The trade volume into the Maltese islands was not only military in nature. Local political elites were also supplied with Eastern Mediterranean goods. Sigillographic evidence concludes Maltese elites included archontes, (Note: Based on the finding of an 8th or 9th century seal belonging to an archon named Teophilaktos.) bishops and members of the ecclesiastical communities. The islands' commercial vitality, reflecting their strategic position in the Mediterranean, and a degree of autonomy which probably allowed the elites to bridge the gap between Muslim Africa and "Byzantine Italies." Maltese elites took on an active stance and engaged in political and trade exchanges with Muslim communities in North Africa – proven by finds of Umayyad coins on the islands and the finding of a seal belonging to Niketas – archon and droungarios of Malta – in Tunisia.

== Early Byzantine sources on Malta ==
=== Justinianic period ===
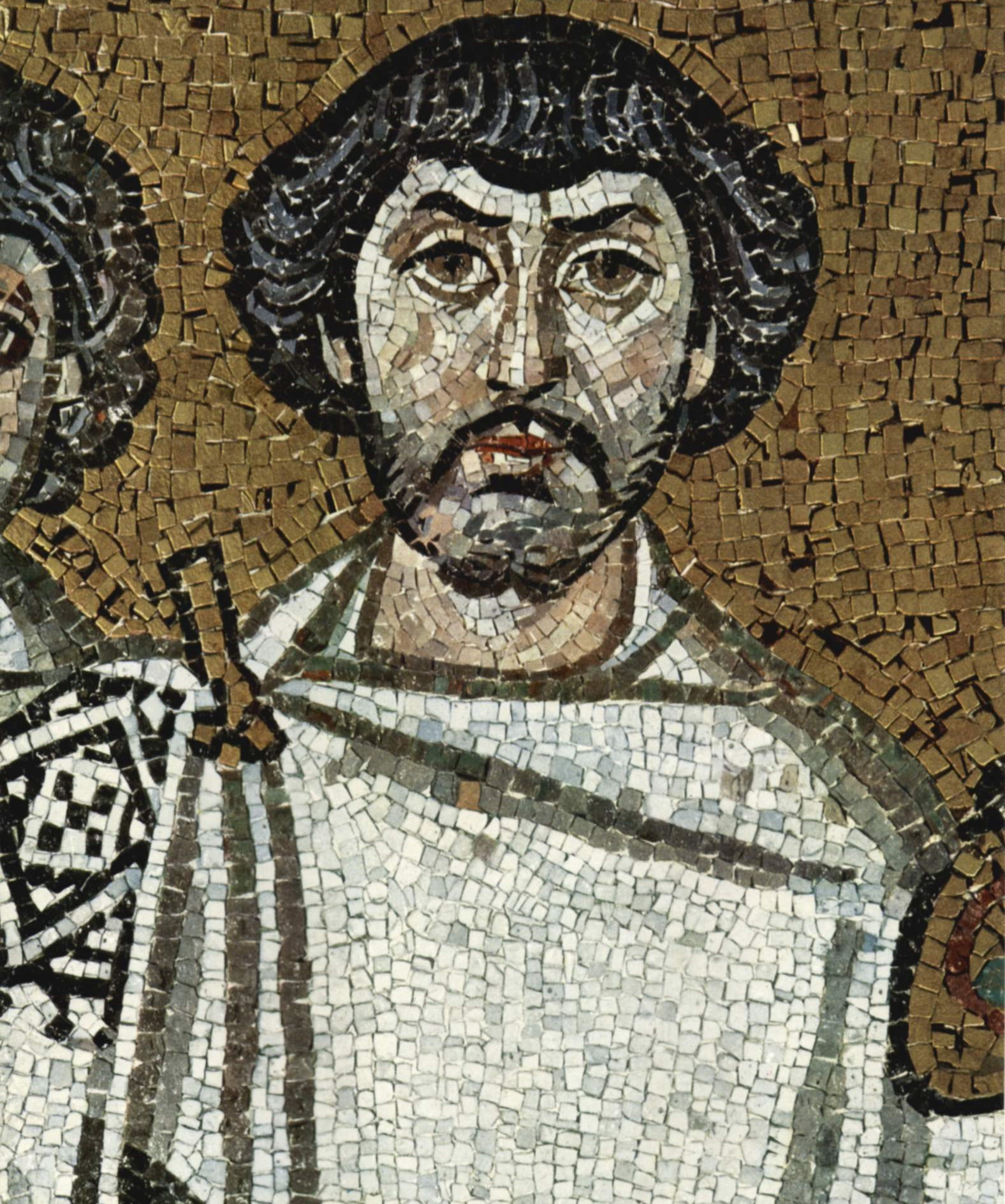
A member of the retinue of Emperor Justinian I in the mosaic in the Church of San Vitale, Ravenna, which is usually identified with Belisarius

One of the earliest mentions of the Maltese islands can be found in a list of donations by Emperor Constatine I in the early fourth century, which includes a grant to the Lateran baptistery of a massa with revenues of 222 solidi which was apparently (Note: If the corrupt Mengaulus represents the island of Gozo.) located on the island of Gozo. However, the first proper mention of Medieval Malta in the context of the Eastern Roman Empire is found in Procopius' Bellum Vandalicum detailing the Byzantine campaign in North Africa. The Byzantine general Belisarius is described "touching at" Malta in 533, while the Roman expeditionary force was sailing from Kaukana to North Africa. (Note: "But when the servant had come before him and told him the whole story, Belisarius rejoiced greatly, heaped praise upon Procopius and gave orders for the departure to be signalled by trumpets. Having set sail quickly, they touched at (Greek: προσέσχον) the islands of Gozo and Malta, which separate the Adriatic from the Tyrrhenian Seas. There a strong east wind arose for them and carried the ships the following day to that part of the African coast which the Romans call in their own tongue the Head of the Shallows. "- Procopius, Bellum Vandalicum.) However, the Greek verb used can mean either "landed" or "approached." In the same passage, Procopius describes Malta as dividing the Adriatic and Tyrrhenian seas, indicating that the islands might have lain on a maritime border separating Vandal and Byzantine spheres. The passage does not say that Belisarius conquered the islands, or that the Maltese islands were already in Byzantine hands. In fact, Malta is not included in the Synecdmus of Hierocles, which details a list of cities belonging to the Empire in 527/8.

Malta probably passed on to the Byzantines around the time of their conquest of Sicily in 535. A further quote in Procopius' Bellum Gothicum describing the war against the Gothic kingdom of Italy, suggests that Malta formed part of the Empire by 544, although it does not mention the islands specifically. (Note: "Some of the surviving Libyans fled to the (fortified) cities, others to Sicily and the other islands."- Procopius, Bellum Gothicum.) The final reference in Procopius regarding Malta refers to 550, regarding the voyage of Artabanes to Sicily. Appointed magister militum per Thracias, Artabanes was sent to replace the aged senator Liberius in command of an expedition under way against Sicily, which had recently been overrun by the Ostrogoth king Totila. Artabanes failed to catch up with the expedition before it sailed for Sicily, and his own fleet was driven back and scattered by severe storms in the Ionian Sea, with Artabanes himself being unexpectedly saved after landing in Malta. (Note: "But one ship, that on which Artabanes himself was sailing, had its mast broken off in the heavy sea. Although it had got into such a dangerous position, it was carried by the surge and followed the swell until it reached the island called Melita. And so it came about that Artabanes was unexpectedly saved."- Procopius, Bellum Gothicum.) Although there are suggestions that Artabanes reached Meleda instead of Malta, both the manuscript's tradition and geographic probability favour Malta.

Other sources on Malta from the Justinian dynasty are limited, with few details on the islands' history. The sixth-century writer Arator described Malta as a statio, a port of call for ships, although this is used in reference to St. Paul's shipwreck on the islands, and should not be used to infer the naval status of Malta, although reference to the harbours of Malta and Gozo are found in later Arabic texts.

=== Bishops of Malta ===
Fragments of mid-9th century Byzantine oil lamps, found in Mdina, Malta.

In 553, Julianus, Bishop of Malta (Latin: Iulianus episcopus Melitensis) is mentioned in Constitutum de Tribus Capitulis of Pope Virgilius, however there may be some ambiguity regarding the name and link with Malta due to inconsistencies in the names in different manuscripts. The first reference of a Bishop of Malta appears in three letters from Pope Gregory I, with the Pope asking Bishop Lucillus of Malta in 592 to ensure that the Maltese clergy holding lands belonging to the African church should pay the tax due on them. The lands are assumed by historians to be in Malta, and their link with the African church may be linked with Vandalic rule in the previous century. The second letter, dated October 598, asks the Bishop of Syracuse to depose Lucillus for an unspecified crime, to punish his accomplices by putting them in monasteries and removing their honours. A phrase about the demotion of soldiers implies that Malta had a military garrison at the time. Pope Gregory then asks the Bishop of Syracuse to instruct the clerus and the populus to elect a new bishop. The third letter, dated to September or October 599, asks Romanus the defensor Siciliae, to make sure that Lucillus and his son hand over the property taken from the church to the new bishop, Traianus. While there appears not to be enough evidence to cast Malta as a suffragan bishopric of Syracuse this early, the letters appear to reveal close ecclesiastical and administrative bonds between the Maltese see and the Syracuse bishopric. Malta may have been similarly linked with the secular administration of Sicily, as suggested by a civil geographic list compiled by George of Cyprus around c. 603 - c. 606.

=== Byzantine exiles in Malta ===
Malta was used as a place for exiles, as found in passages from two historians. In the Historia syntomos, Patriarch Nikephoros details how Emperor Heraclius sent Theodorus, a magister by rank, to the island of Gaudomelete, ordering the dux of the place to amputate one of his feet upon arrival. This reveals that by 637, the date of the revolt which led to the exile of John Athalarichos and Theodorus, Malta may have been governed by military officers, similar to the way Sicily and Italy were being ruled. The chronicler Theophanes describes how in 790, Emperor Constantine VI punished the leaders of the revolt in the Armeniac Theme by branding their faces and exiling the leaders to Sicily and "the other islands."

== Administration ==
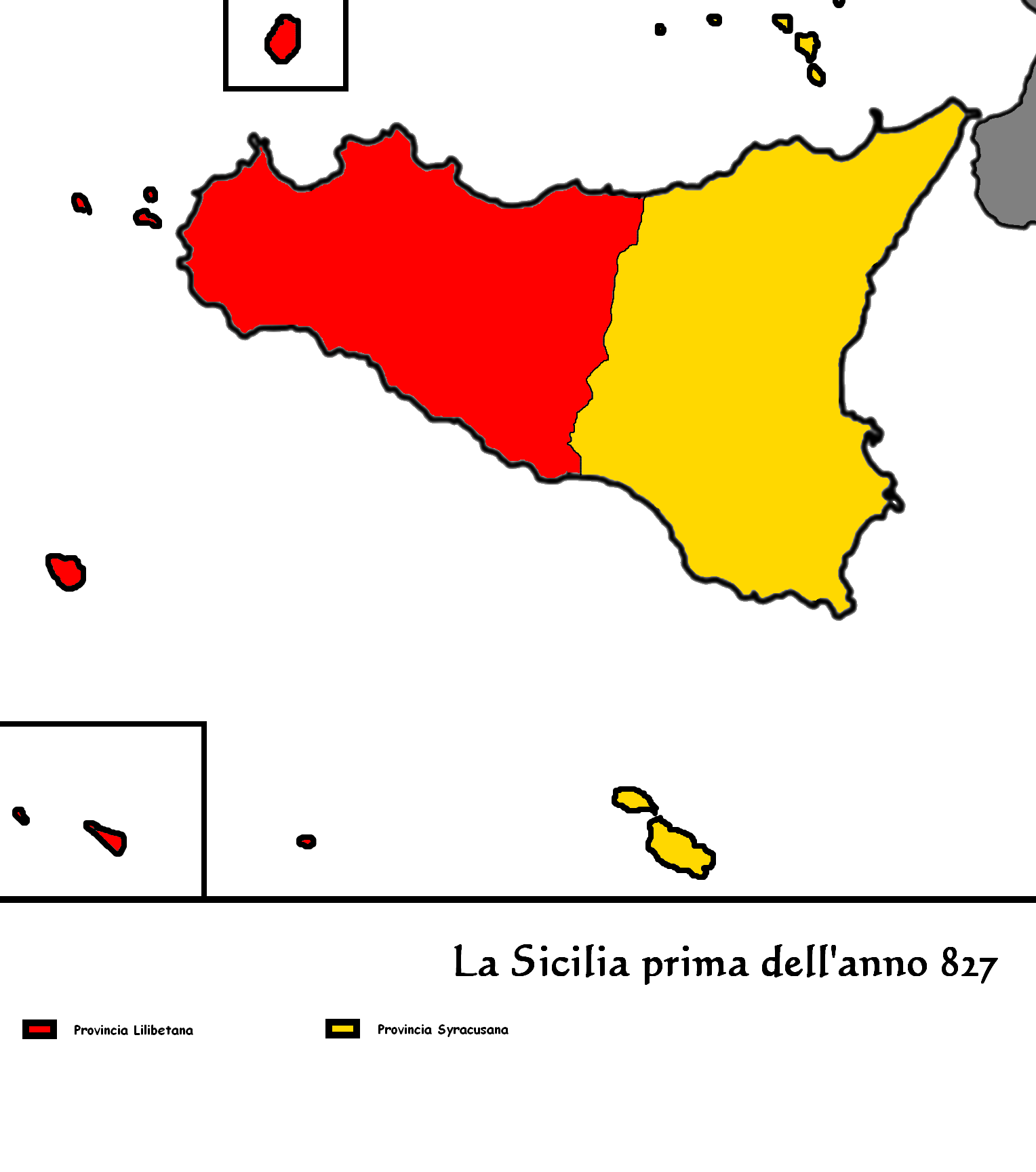
Malta formed part of the Syracusan administrative province (in yellow) within the theme of Sikelia in 663.

=== Secular government ===
A seal dated to the eight century was found in Tunis, belonging to Nicetas, archon and droungarios of Malta, (Ancient Greek: + Νικήτᾀ δρονγγ'[αρίῳ]ς [καὶ] ἄρχοντ[ι] Μελέτ᾿[ης], + Nikētas dronggariōs kaì árkhonti Melétēs) with historians deducing that Malta may have been ruled by a high-ranking naval official, in command of a small fleet. Other historians have gone beyond this analysis, saying that Malta was the base of an important naval squadron under direct imperial, rather than thematic, control. However, the lack of evidence and sources, as well as historical close links between Sicily and Malta, are seen to count against both the existence of such a governing structure for Malta, as well as the existence of an important Byzantine naval base on the islands. A case could be made, however, for a Byzantine official being both the land army commander of a droungos, who had also taken over the role of an archon, or civil governor of a town.

Recent excavations have shed more light on Malta's role as a trading post, with regional political powers having strong vested interests in Malta during the 8th century. The islands are seen to act as a somehow privileged territory, acting as a bridge between North Africa and the south of Italy. Malta was capable of importing large amounts of goods from far off regions, and of links with both Byzantine and Arab trading networks. Urban cores, such as Melite, were comparatively affluent, politically powerful and enjoyed access to various imported goods, while peripheral areas such as Safi, had access to more basic material culture.

=== Ecclesiastical government ===
Historians contend that the transfer of Sicilian dioceses from the Patriarchate of Rome to Constantinople, and the elevation of Syracuse to metropolitan status, obscure the ecclesiastical organisation of Malta during this period. No Bishops of Malta appeared at Roman synods or in Ecumenical councils in the East in the seventh, eight or ninth century. A Maltese bishop named Manas may have attended the Eight Ecumenical Council held in Constantinople in 869-870, and is identified with a Maltese bishop held as a captive in Palermo by the Aghlabids in 878. However, no Maltese bishop is identified in the council's acts, making historians' identification unwarranted.

In at least seven notitiae, the bishopric of Malta is classified as a bishopric under the metropolitan see of Syracuse, or belonging to the province of Sicily. Notitia X and Notitia III specifically mention protopopes appointed for Melite in the 12th and 13th centuries, and X mentions one, Nikolaos, and his wife, Milo, by name. Fiorini and Vella note that it was sometimes the Byzantine practice to appoint a protopope (Ancient Greek: πρτωπαπάς) to vacant dioceses, and the authors see this as evidence of continuity of Byzantine ecclesiastical hierarchy, in an albeit truncated form, under the period of Muslim rule; a Christian "bishop" (ἐπίσκοπος, epískopos) found on the island after its conquest by Roger II of Sicily was probably actually such a protopope instead.

==== Byzantine Basilica at Tas-Silġ ====
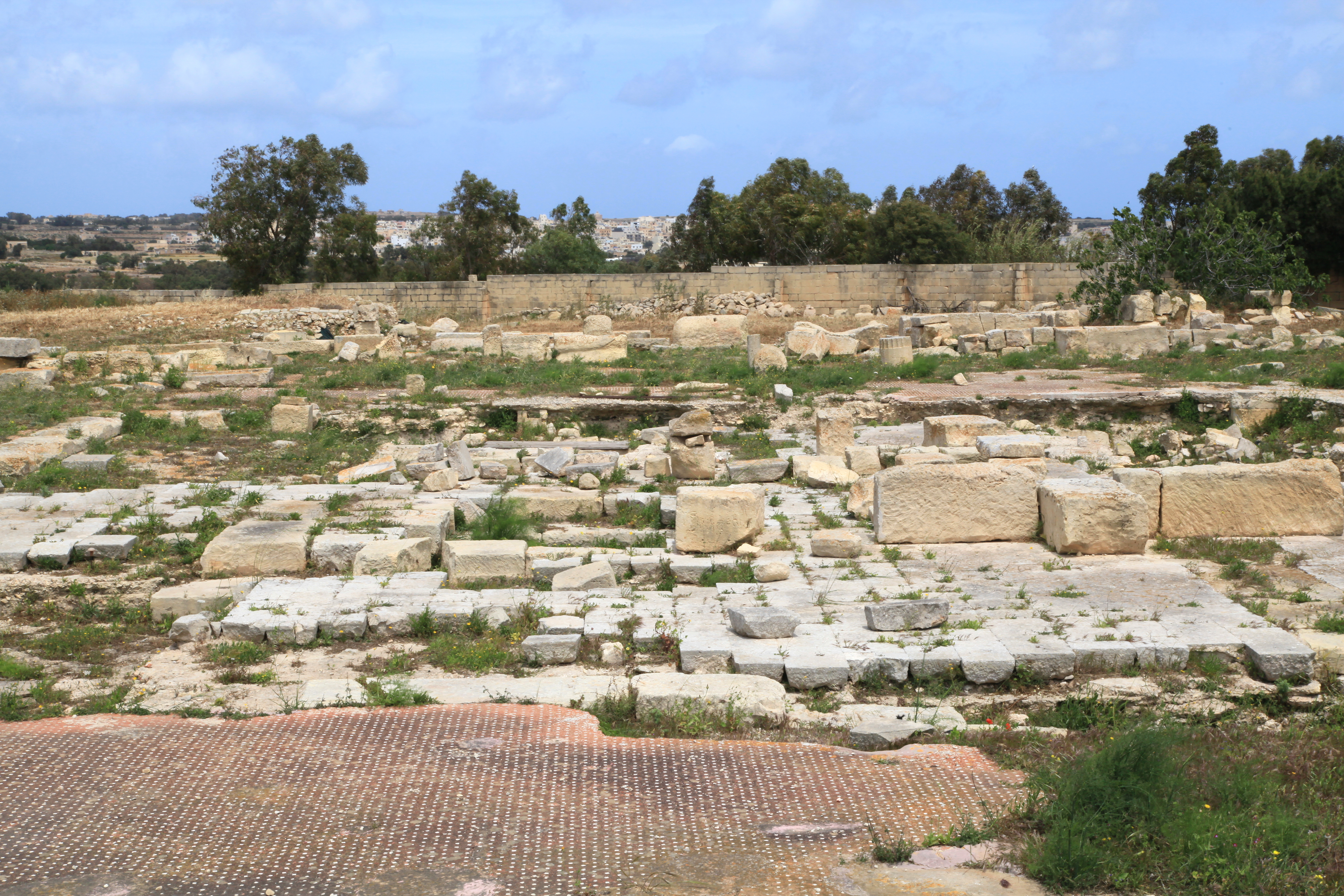
Remains of the Byzantine basilica at Tas-Silġ.

The Hellenistic temple at the multi-period sanctuary site at Tas-Silġ, between Żejtun and Marsaxlokk, was converted into a Christian basilica. The basilica was built in the porticoed courtyard of the temple, which was roofed over. The square building had three naves with an apse at the eastern end. The prehistoric megalithic temple was reused as a baptistery, with the font placed in the middle of the ancient structure. The church, or at least its structure, remained in use until the 8th-9th centuries. A fortified wall with at least one tower was built around part of the site, possibly as a response to the Arab threat. More than two hundred Byzantine coins were found in the drain of the baptismal font, dating from the mid-4th century, the reforms by Justinian (538-9) and a gold coin dated to Constantine IV.

== Culture ==
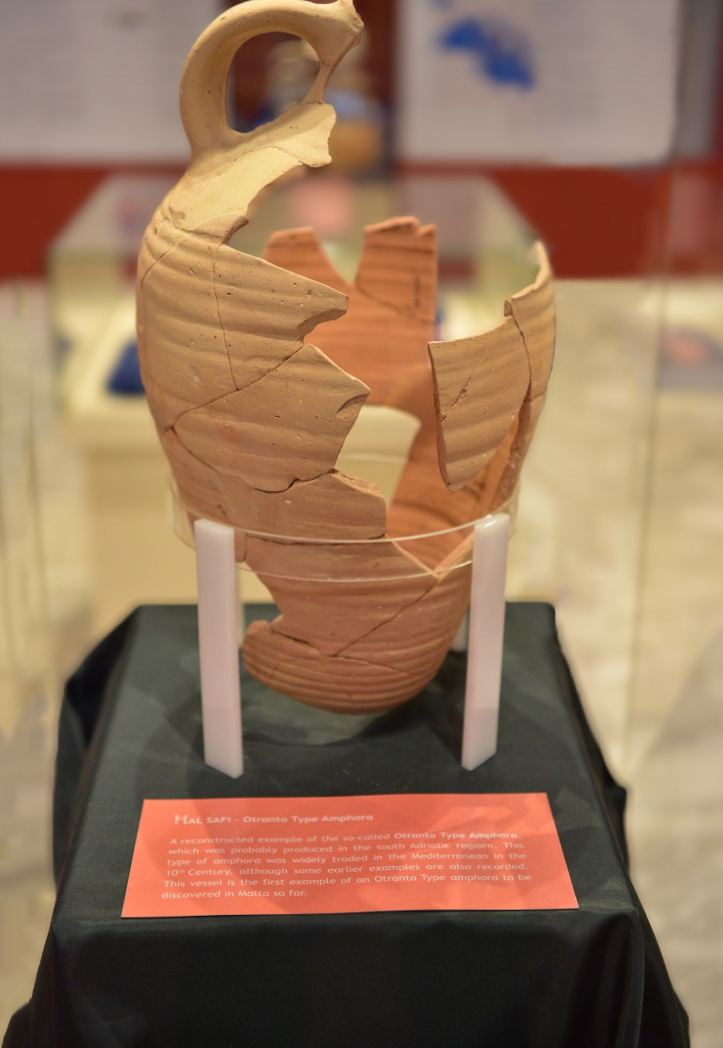
Fragments of a 10th century Otranto-type amphora, found in Ħal Safi, Malta. Such pottery finds confirm continued trade links with Byzantine Southern Italy well into the Arab period.

The architectural and artistic style prevalent in Malta was not that of Constantinople proper but rather the Byzantine styles of Sicily. Pottery has been discovered with distinctively Otranto-type amphorae markers, that further testify to the close ties between Malta and Southern Italy. The number of Greek inscriptions found in Malta and Gozo lead historians to believe that a degree of Hellenisation occurred, in a similar manner to the process seen in Sicily. The inscriptions, and the catacombs in which they were mostly found, usually date from the third to the fifth century.

The basilica at Tas-Silġ was expanded, modified and reutilised to include a fortified settlement linked with Marsaxlokk harbour below. Ceramic remains from Tas-Silġ span from the sixth to the ninth century, evidence that the harbour and settlement had links over centuries with various parts of the Mediterranean. This is also confirmed by finds of a spatheion amphora in Grand Harbour, and late Roman amphorae in Marsascala, and other remains at Ta' Xbiex, Manoel Island, Sliema creek and Mistra Bay. The quantity of remains leads historians to infer widespread use of Maltese harbours during the Byzantine era.

In 1768, 260 late Roman North African amphorae were found stacked in a chamber of the Kortin (Note: Gambin identifies the area around the Marsa Power Station as the likely area for these warehouses, coinciding with the names Kortin, Qortin and Cortino.) warehouses, twenty four of which had graffiti of a religious nature on them. Given the distance from the main town, historians assume that these warehouse facilities were used for redistribution towards other harbours in the Central Mediterranean. Large quantities of Byzantine era pottery were also found at the Kortin promontory in Marsa, with traces of a fire leading excavators to assume that the buildings and the quay were abandoned in late eight or early ninth century, with the date established due to the presence of globular amphorae on site. The presence of earlier ceramics at the same level may indicate an earlier abandoning.

Warehouses in the inner harbour at Marsa were abandoned earlier than those in Kortin, due to silting, with no evidence of use found by the fifth or sixth century. Due to the silting, the main maritime activity probably concentrated on the Kortin area, a hypothesis which is confirmed by a number of later burial sites.

Other burial remains linked with the Byzantine era are a number of catacombs, including St. Paul's catacombs, the Abbatija Tad-Dejr hypogeal complex, and Tal-Barrani.

== Muslim conquest ==
Malta's strategic location between the Byzantine Empire (in orange) and Aghlabid Emirate of Ifriqiya (in green), c. 867.

With the loss of the Byzantine Exarchate of Africa first, and eventually the loss of Sicily, Malta found itself in an increasingly politically fragmented Mediterranean. Malta lost out on its position between the Aegean and North Africa when the Byzantine Empire lost the grain producing provinces of Africa. The islands experienced a less favourable economic situation, the abandonment of the Marsa main port and warehouses, as well as Arab raids. These led to a decreased potential for transhipment of goods through Malta and the provision of maritime services.

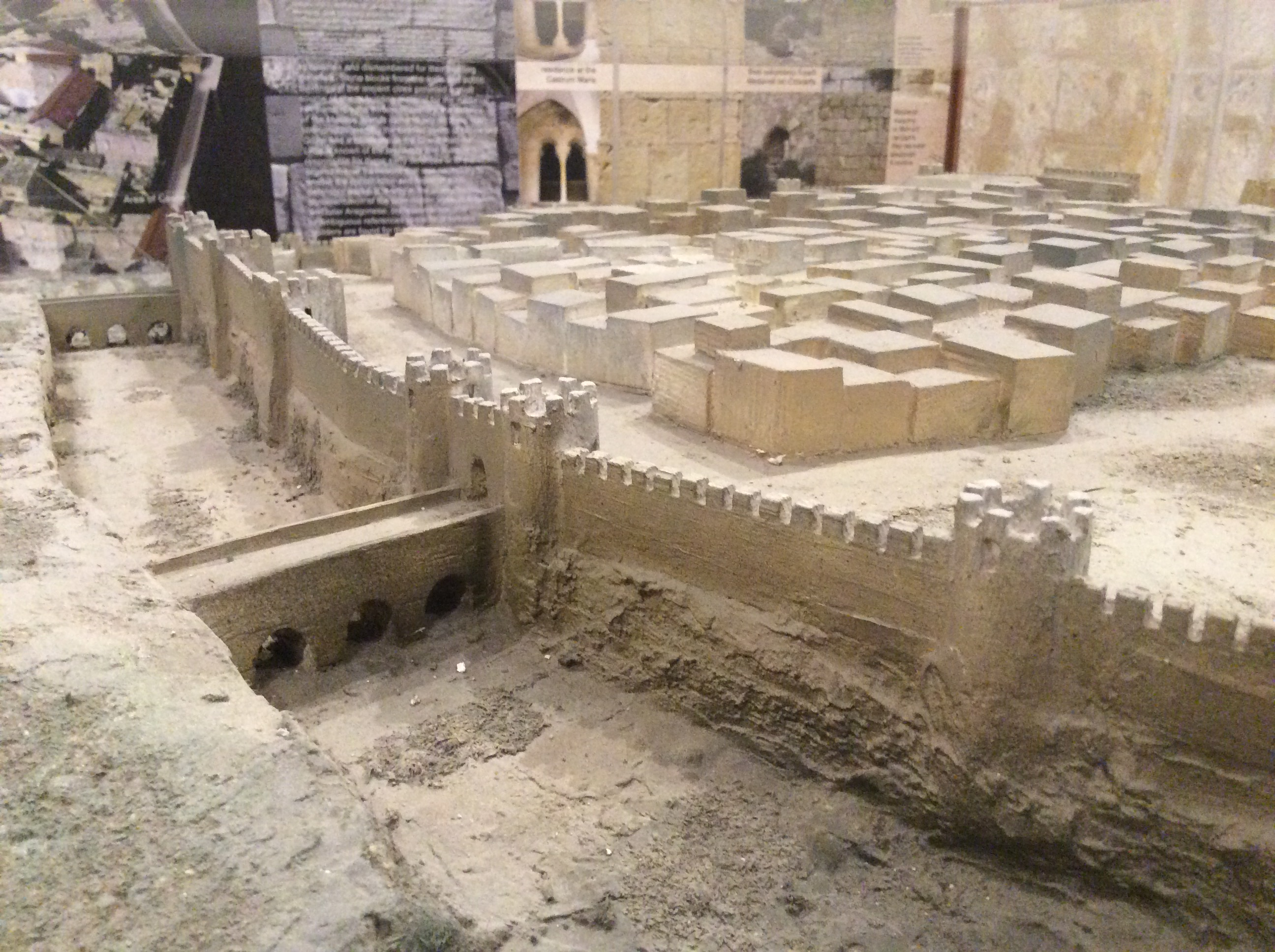
A possible reconstruction of the Roman walls of Melite.

This new geopolitical fragmentation was mirrored by developments in Malta, as rural settlement sites were either abandoned or witnessed serious declines in the eight and ninth centuries, with burial sites across the islands being abandoned, implying the abandonment of open spaces in rural and coastal areas and a move to fortified nuclei. The main urban centre of the island, Melite, was heavily modified during this period, with changes including the strengthening of fortifications and the addition of a fortress within the town.

From the second half of the seventh century onward, Muslim raiders were active in the Central Mediterranean. Although its strategic position meant that Malta came under increasing pressure, there are no references to raids on Malta before the ninth century. There is a reference to a probable raid on Malta in the chronicles of Ibn al-Athir in 835-836, saying that Abu Iqal, from the al-Aghlab dynasty, prepared an expedition which attacked the islands near Sicily and obtained great plunder. This attack is usually taken to be nothing more than a reconnaissance raid, as historians view the attack to be too early for a definitive conquest of Malta. All Greek and Arab sources agree that the conquest of Malta occurred later.

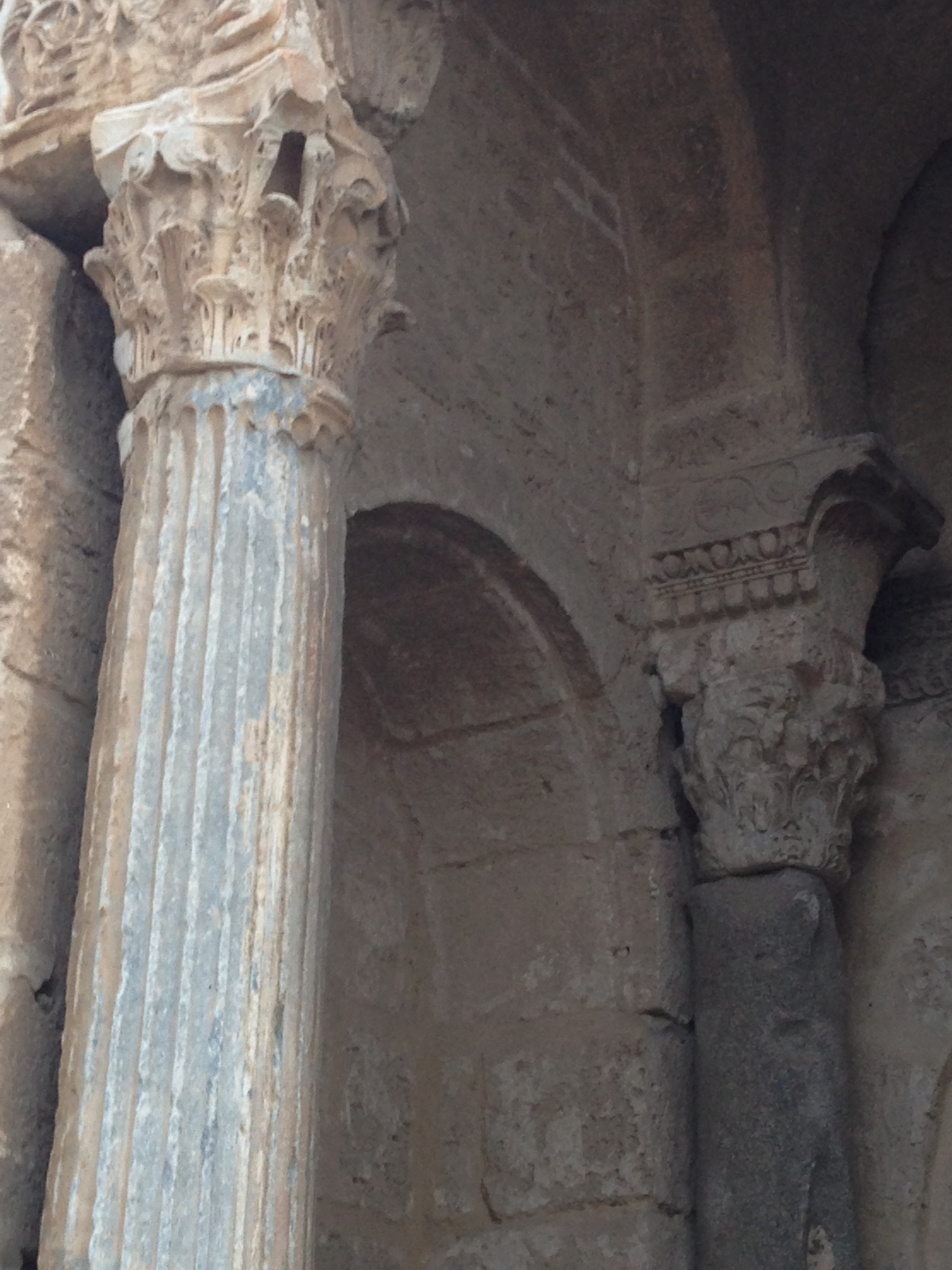
The marble and columns found in the Ribat of Sousse were pillaged from Malta in 870.

Of all the islands around Sicily, Malta was the last to remain in Byzantine hands, and in 869 a fleet under Ahmad ibn Umar ibn Ubaydallah ibn al-Aghlab al-Habashi attacked it. The Byzantines, having received timely reinforcements, resisted successfully at first, but in 870 Muhammad sent a fleet from Sicily to the island, and the capital Melite fell on 29 August 870. The local governor was captured, the town was plundered—Ahmad al-Habashi reportedly took along the local cathedral's marble columns to decorate his palace—and its fortifications razed. The fall of Malta had important ramifications for the defence of what remained of Byzantine Sicily: with Reggio Calabria and now Malta in their hands, the Muslims completed their encirclement of Sicily, and could easily interdict any aid sent from the east.

Ibn Khaldun reports that the conquest of Malta by the Aghlabids happened as early as 868. Ibn al-Khatib dates the conquest of Malta, and the capture of its "king" between 11 February and 12 March 875, while Al-Nuwayri refers to the same general period, without giving a specific date. Ibn al-Athir recounts that in 869-870, the Emir of Sicily sent an army to Malta, as the island was being besieged by the Byzantines who then fled. This date is also confirmed by a Greek chronicle from Cassano, Calabria, saying that the island of Melite surrendered on 29 August 870. This date is again confirmed in another Arab source, the Kitab al-'Uyun, which says that Malta was conquered by Abdallah I, and gives the date for the conquest to be three days before Ramadan 256 AH, that is, 28 August 870. Historians explain the slight discrepancy due to uncertainties in lunar observations relating to the Islamic calendar.

The siege of Melite (modern Mdina) was initially led by Halaf al-Hādim, a renowned engineer, but he was killed and replaced by Sawāda Ibn Muḥammad. The city withstood the siege for some weeks or months, but it ultimately fell to the invaders, and its inhabitants were massacred and the city was sacked.

However, Ibn al-Athir states that by 870 Malta was already a Muslim settlement, and that the Arab-held island was being besieged by a Byzantine fleet. After a relief force was sent from Muslim Sicily, the Byzantines retreated without a fight on 28 Ramadan 256 (29 August 870). Some historians surmise that the local population sided with the Byzantine fleet, breaking a prior covenant with the Arab rulers, such that the Muslims then retaliated, imprisoned the bishop, and destroyed the islands' churches.

The use of marble from the churches of Melite in the Ribat of Sousse is confirmed by an inscription which translates to:

Every cut slab, every marble column in this fort was brought over from the church of Malta by Ḥabaši ibn ‘Umar in the hope of meriting the approval and kindness of Allāh the Powerful and Glorious.

=== Byzantine attempt to retake Malta ===
Although al-Himyarī states that Malta remained an "uninhabited ruin" after the siege and it was only repopulated in 1048–49, archaeological evidence suggests that Mdina was already a thriving Muslim settlement by the beginning of the 11th century. The Byzantines besieged this new settlement in 445 AH (1053–54 AD), "with many ships and in great numbers." Mdina's inhabitants asked for clemency but were refused. The Muslims were not numerous, and they were outnumbered by their slaves. The slaves were offered their freedom by the Muslims, and the slaves agreed with these terms. The invaders began an assault on the following day, but after some fighting they were repelled "and they fled defeated without looking back," with most of the Byzantine ships being lost in the attack. Historians cannot confirm whether this attack was an attempt to recapture the islands and establish a naval base, or whether it was a punitive attack on pirates which may have operated from the islands. Following this episode, the Byzantines never attempted to attack Malta again.

"The Rûm attacked it [Malta] after 440 (1048/9), they waged war with the [inhabitants] and they demanded from them riches and women [...] And the Muslims assembled and counted themselves, and the number of their slaves exceeded the number of free men [...] So they said to their slaves: "Fight with us; and if you win, you will be free and what we have will also be yours; if you do not agree to this, we shall be killed, and so will you," [...] And when the Rûm came forward [the Muslims and the slaves] charged the enemy as a single man; and God helped them, so that they defeated and slaughtered a great number of the Rûm. The slaves were raised up to the level of the free men; their [joint] power became very strong and after this event the Rûm never again attacked them.
– Al-Qazwini

== See also ==
- History of Islam in southern Italy
- History of the Jews in Malta
- Norman conquest of southern Italy
- Norman-Arab-Byzantine culture

== Bibliography ==
=== Primary ===
- Procopius of Caesarea. History of the Wars, Volumes I, II. – via Wikisource.
- Procopius of Caesarea (2016). Delphi Complete Works of Procopius (Illustrated). Delphi Classics. ISBN 978-1786563736.

=== Secondary ===
- Amari, M (1933). Storia dei Musulmani di Sicilia (2nd ed.). Catania.
- Atauz, Ayse Devrim (2004). Trade, Piracy, And Naval Warfare In The Central Mediterranean: The Maritime History And Archaeology Of Malta (PDF). Texas A&M University.
- Blouet, Brian W. (2007). The Story of Malta. Allied Publications. p. 41. ISBN 978-9990930818.
- Brincat, Joseph M. (1995). Malta 870–1054 Al-Himyari's Account and its Linguistic Implications (PDF). Valletta: Said International. pp. 1–33. Archived from the original on 2016-03-04.
- Brown, T.S. (1975). Luttrell, Anthony (ed.). Byzantine Malta (PDF). London: The British School at Rome. pp. 71–87. Archived from the original on February 15, 2016.
- Brubaker, Leslie; Haldon, John (2011). Byzantium in the Iconoclast Era, C. 680–850: A History. Cambridge University Press. p. 174. ISBN 978-0521430937.
- Bruno, Brunella; Cutajar, Nataniel (2013). Zanini, Enrico; Pergola, Philippe; Michaelidis, Demetrios (eds.). "Amphorae and Economic Activity in Malta". The Insular System of Byzantine Mediterranean. Archaeology and History. Oxford: BAR: 15–30.
- Bury, John Bagnell (1958) [1923]. History of the Later Roman Empire: From the Death of Theodosius I to the Death of Justinian, Volume 2. Mineola, New York: Dover Publications. OCLC 41478187.
- Busuttil, Joseph (1971). "Maltese harbours in Antiquity" (PDF). Melita Historica. 5: 305–307. Archived from the original on April 16, 2016.
- Cardona, David (2013). Tas-Silg : from prehistoric temple to Byzantine church. pp. 18–24.
- Coleiro, Edoardo (1965). Cagiano De Azevedo, Michelangelo (ed.). Tre lettere di S. Gregorio Magno. Rome: Centro Di Studi Semitici: Istituto Di Studi Del Vicino Oriente. pp. 17–21.
- Dalli, Charles (2008). Bonanno, A; Militello, P (eds.). Satellite, sentinel, stepping stone: medieval Malta in Sicily's orbit. Palermo: Officina di Studi Medievali. pp. 245–258. ISBN 9788888615752.
- Davis, Raymond (2000). The Book of Pontiffs (Liber Pontificalis): The Ancient Biographies of the First Ninety Roman Bishops to AD 715. Liverpool University Press. p. xxxi. ISBN 978-0853235453.
- Diehl, Charles (1896). L'Afrique Byzantine. Histoire de la Domination Byzantine en Afrique (533–709) (in French). Paris: Ernest Leroux.
- Fsadni, Stephanie (2019-02-04). "Shedding light on the Dark Ages". Times of Malta.
- Gambin, Timothy (2005). Archaeological discoveries at Marsa over the centuries. Malta: The Archaeological Society, Malta. pp. 49–54.
- Gambin, Timothy (2004). De Maria, Lorenza; Turchetti, Rita (eds.). Malta and the Mediterranean shipping lanes in the Middle Ages. Rubbettino Editore. pp. 115–134. ISBN 8849811179.
- Honigmann, E. (1939). Le synekdemos d' Hierokles et l'opuscule geographique de Georges de Chypre. Brussels.
- Hughes, Ian (2009). Belisarius: The Last Roman General. Yardley, PA: Westholme Publishing, LLC. ISBN 978-1-59416-528-3.
- Mango, Cyril, ed. (1990), Nikephoros, Patriarch of Constantinople: Short History (1990 ed.), Dumbarton Oaks, ISBN 0-88402-184-X
- Martindale, John R., ed. (1992). The Prosopography of the Later Roman Empire: Volume III, AD 527–641. Cambridge: Cambridge University Press. ISBN 0-521-20160-8.
- Metcalfe, Alex (2009), The Muslims of Medieval Italy, Edinburgh: Edinburgh University Press, ISBN 978-0-7486-2008-1
- Petschening, M. (1881). Corpus Scriptorum Ecclesiasticorum Latinorum. Vol. 7I, 13–14. Bonn.
- Tjäder, J-O (1955). Die nichtliterarischen lateinischen Papyri aus Italiens: 445–700. Lund.
- Rossi, E. (1991). "Malta 1. History". In Bosworth, C. E.; van Donzel, E. & Pellat, Ch. (eds.). The Encyclopaedia of Islam, Second Edition. Volume VI: Mahk–Mid. Leiden: E. J. Brill. p. 395. ISBN 978-90-04-08112-3.
- Vasiliev, A. A. (1968), Byzance et les Arabes, Tome II, 1ére partie: Les relations politiques de Byzance et des Arabes à l'époque de la dynastie macédonienne (867–959) (in French), French ed.: Henri Grégoire, Marius Canard, Brussels: Éditions de l'Institut de Philologie et d'Histoire Orientales
- Zavagno, Luca (2017), "Cyprus Between Late Antiquity and the Early Middle Ages (ca. 600–800): An Island in Transition", Volume 21 of Birmingham Byzantine and Ottoman Studies, Taylor & Francis, ISBN 978-1351999120
- Zavagno, Luca (2018), "'Islands in the stream': toward a new history of the large islands of the Byzantine Mediterranean in the early Middle Ages ca. 600–ca. 800" (PDF), Mediterranean Historical Review, vol. 33, no. 2, pp. 149–177
