= Għar Għerduf catacombs =

Christian catacombs in Gozo, Malta

- Għar Gerduf
- Interactive map of Għar Għerduf catacombs
- 36.041966°N 14.232076°E
- Type: Catacombs
- Location: Triq ta' Xuxa, Kerċem

Site notes
- Owner: Public
- Public access: Limited

The Għar Għerduf catacombs at Ta' Kerċem, also known as Għar Gerduf, are the only surviving early Christian catacombs or paleochristian hypogea in Gozo, Malta. Għar Għerduf is a unique Roman burial site in Gozo, which has for centuries attracted the attention of scholars interested in Maltese archaeology. The site was visited by erudite visitors who often included a description of the place as they did for Ġgantija and the Xagħra Stone Circle.

== History ==
"[...] in the region called Għar Gerduf there is a cave of the same name in an orchard. In this cave one can see a burial place or as it is commonly called Dormitory where people used to live and it resembles a catacomb. It has the same shape as the catacomb found at Rabat of Mdina. The only difference is this: the Mdina catacombs are underground while the one at Għar Għerduf is in a cave above ground with many passageways hewn into the rock. Of these passageways only one remains"
– Agius de Soldanis

The catacombs are dug into the Globigerina Limestone, on the western slope of Lunzjata Valley. The probable first mention of the site was made by the Maltese historian Giovanni Francesco Abela, who described the site as a cave which was one of the many cripte antiche de' sagri cimiteri, that is, crypts of ancient cemeteries.

The complex has suffered extensive damage, due to widespread quarrying during the nineteenth century, with Vassallo dating the mutilation to the 1870s.

The site, however, had been in a poor state of conservation for centuries: The Gozitan historian Giovanni Pietro Francesco Agius de Soldanis already said the catacombs included only one passageway, the only one of many that remained by the mid-18th century.

Originally, the complex had a long corridor which extended for around 14 metres in an east–west direction. A number of arcosolia are hewn into the walls. These vary in size, some having one trough-tomb, others having from three to five. Four of these tombs with headrests can still be identified.

During Late Antiquity, Ghar Għerduf may have served as a burial ground serving the Roman settlement at Rabat. Għar Gerduf is the only late Roman and Byzantine catacomb in Gozo described by Prof. Mario Buhagiar in his archaeological survey of 1986, for which the exact whereabouts are known, and that is still visible.

== Conservation ==
Trough tombs at Għar Għerduf catacombs. The catacombs suffered damage from quarrying in the nineteenth century.

Għar Għerduf was the only Phoenician, Carthaginian and Roman site in Gozo featured in the List of Buildings, Sites and Remains for the purposes of Article 6 of The Protection of Antiquities Act of 1925. By then, however, the surviving remains were already in an abandoned and poor state. Għar Gerduf suffered substantial mutilation during the second half of the nineteenth century. Almost all the internal wall partitions aligning the arcosolia were chiselled down, while the floor was lowered by several metres to form two interlinking and split-level halls. Luckily, however, the ceiling preserves enough information to permit a reliable reconstruction of the hypogeum's original set-up. This resulting peculiar configuration is, in turn, unique when compared to other sites in Malta and in other countries.

In 2000, the site's protection was extended through Government Notice 856 of 2000 which designated Għar Għerduf and a 100-metre buffer zone as a Class A Site of Archaeological Importance, a scheduling which is comparable to that given to Mnajdra and Ħaġar Qim.

By the mid-2010s, plans were submitted for construction within the remains' archaeological buffer zone, which would have made access to the site difficult. NGOs and activists called for the remains to be protected and saved. By 2017, several fissures and overgrown weeds were plainly visible in the catacomb structure. The site was eventually saved from development, with the building permit issued on the basis of wrong data being rescinded. In 2019, public authorities bought up €400,000 worth of land in the area through expropriation to aid the protection of the site. Authorities are working on cleaning and improving access to the site, with further excavations not being excluded.

== See also ==
- Abbatija Tad-Dejr

== Bibliography ==
=== Primary ===
- Abela, Giovanni Francesco (1647). Della Descrittione Di Malta Isola Nel Mare Siciliano Con Le Sue Antichita, Ed Altre Notitie. Vol. II. Malta: Paolo Bonacota. p. 387.
- Agius de Soldanis, Giovanni Pietro Francesco (1999) [1746]. Gozo: Ancient and modern religious and profane. Vol. II. Malta: Media Centre. p. 151. ISBN 9789990920291.
- Malta Government Gazette (2000). Notice 856 of 2000 (PDF). Malta: Government of Malta. p. 8167.

=== Secondary ===
- Bonanno, Anthony; Cilia, Daniel (2005). Malta: Phoenician, Punic, and Roman. Midsea Books. pp. 348–349. ISBN 9789993270355.
- Vassallo, Cesare (1876). Dei monumenti antichi nel gruppo di Malta, cenni storici. Periodo fenicio ed egizio. Stamperia del Governo. p. 40.
