= Fgura Farmhouse =

Coordinates: 35°52′21″N 14°31′23″E

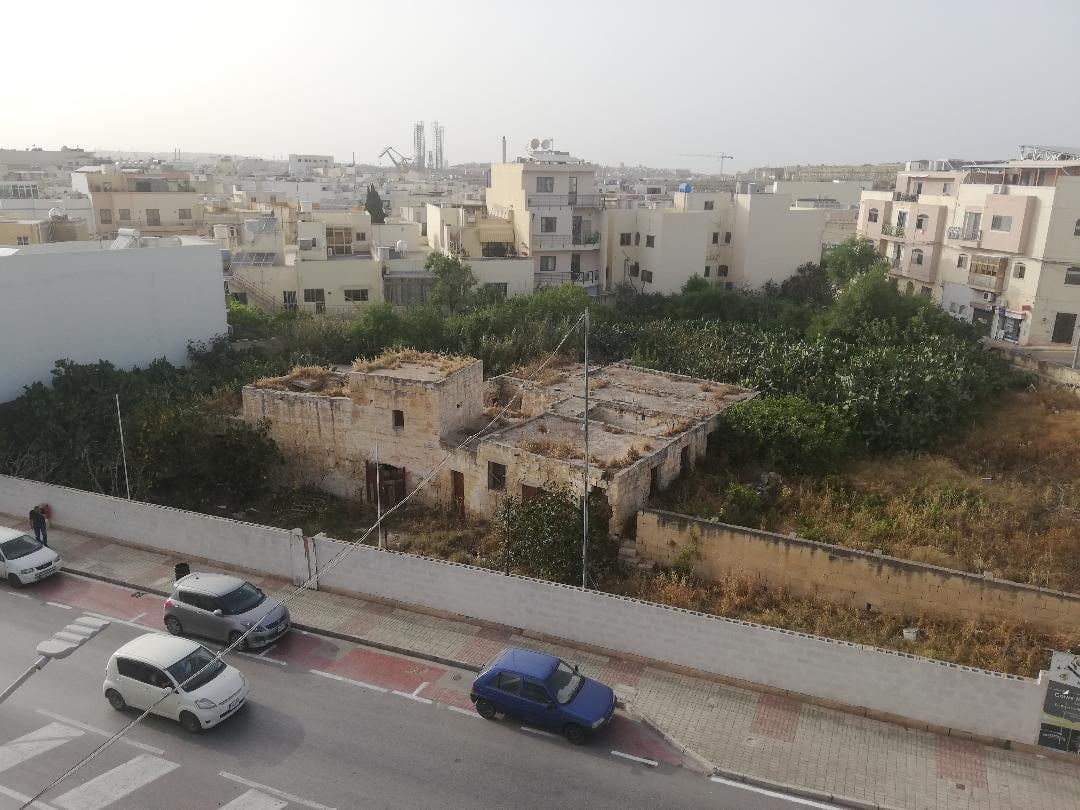
The Fgura farmhouse before demolition

The Fgura farmhouse was a historic farmhouse located in Fgura, Malta—believed to date back over 200 years and considered the last surviving structure linked to the Ficura family, from whom the town's name is derived.

== Historical significance and features ==
Documents from the Notarial Archives dating to 1505 indicate that the farmhouse was the only remaining property associated with the Ficura family, the original owners of the surrounding fields and farms, and the source of the town's name. The farmhouse, located near the site of an 18th-century church demolished in 1955, also served as a Victory kitchen during World War Two.

The building featured several vernacular architectural elements—including xorok (stone slab ceilings), kileb (corbels), animal stalls, mangers, a barumbara (dovecote), carved decorations, and a religious niche for the Virgin Mary — which also lent its name to a nearby street.

== Protection status and controversy ==
In 1995, the Planning Authority granted the farmhouse Grade 3 scheduling, indicating basic protection; any replacement structure would need to be in harmony with its surroundings. During the 2000s, the Authority denied multiple attempts to de-schedule it (in 2009, 2011 and 2015).

In 2019, the Environment and Planning Review Tribunal unexpectedly removed the scheduling, approving a request by the developer (Landscape Properties, represented by Robert Musumeci) to do so. The tribunal argued that the farmhouse had been altered over time and had lost its original context due to surrounding modern development.

== Community opposition and demolition ==
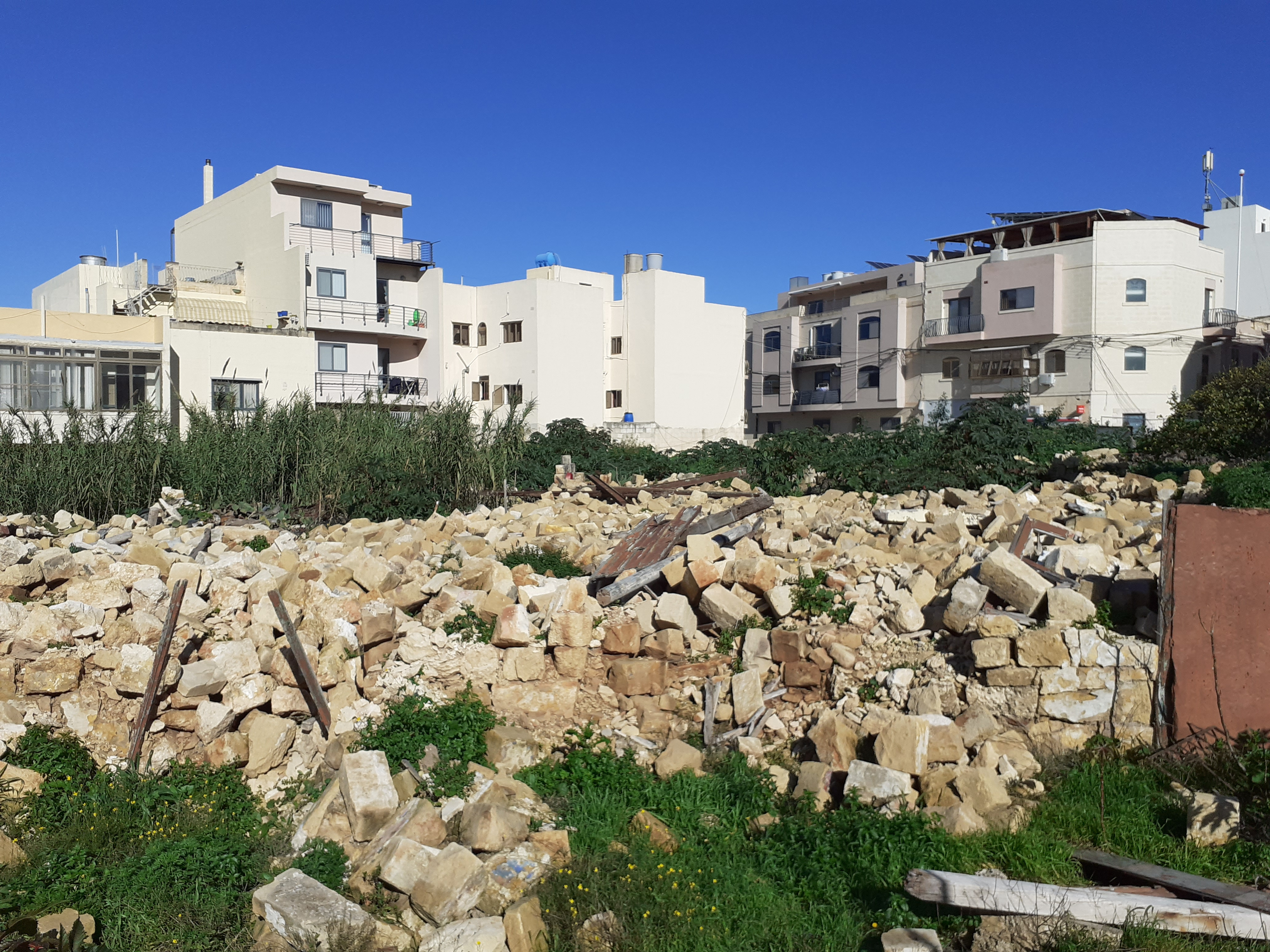
The ruins of Fgura's farmhouse after demolition in December 2021

Local advocacy groups — including the Fgura Local Council and environmental NGO Flimkien għal Ambjent Aħjar (FAA) — actively opposed the de-scheduling and proposed demolition, arguing that the farmhouse and its adjoining fields constituted the last "green lung" and a vital expression of Fgura’s heritage.

By 2021, the farmhouse had been completely demolished. Development applications were subsequently submitted for a large residential project on the site.

== Subsequent planning and heritage gain compensation ==
Under the approved permit, the developer paid a €7,000 "heritage gain" fee instead of re-using stone corbels from the farmhouse. The Superintendence for Cultural Heritage explained that incorporating such elements would "constitute a pastiche devoid of context," and accepted the compensation in lieu of physical re-use.

== Planned development ==
The planning application (PA/4084/22) submitted by the Vassallo Group proposes a 5‑storey block containing a ground‑level retail outlet, 48 apartments, 14 penthouses, and underground parking on the former farmhouse site.
