= Salina Catacombs =

Coordinates: 35.9441700°N 14.4247200°E

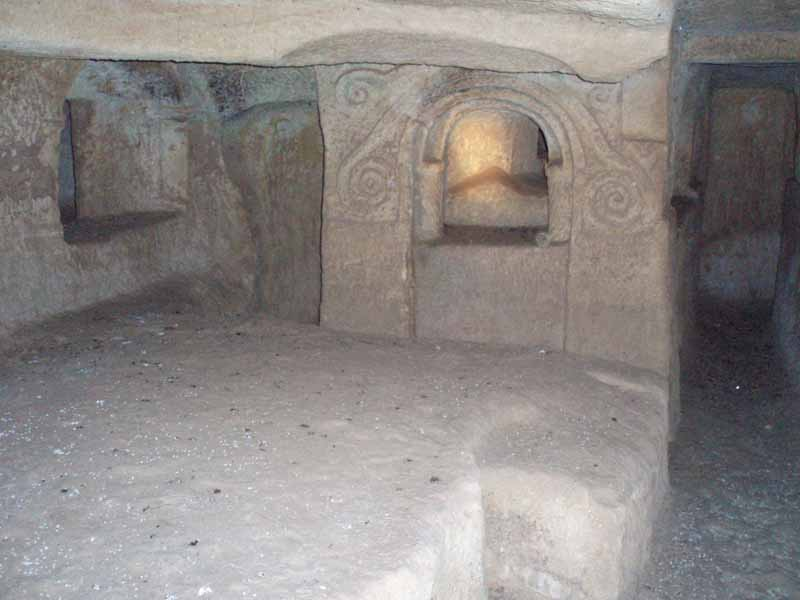
- One of the mass catacombs at Salina
- Location: Naxxar, Malta
- Type: Catacombs
- Website: www.heritagemalta.org

The Salina Catacombs are a cluster of small catacombs located near the Church of the Annunciation in Salina, Naxxar, in Malta. Although small when compared to the catacombs of St. Paul and St. Agatha in Rabat, they are an important record of the sizeable community that must have lived in the area in around the last half of the first millennium AD.

The catacombs open on to a low ridge facing a now lost Roman harbour, making the small site archaeologically important.

The site is managed by Heritage Malta and is closed to the public for conservation.

== Description ==
The site comprises five hypogea cut into the vertical surface of a small quarry. A number of other openings can be seen in rocky outcrops around the site and at least one hypogeum has been damaged by further quarrying, resulting in the destruction of a number of burials.

The most impressive hypogeum is adorned with two decorated pillars, an agape table and two baldacchino tombs, rarely found outside the catacombs of Rabat. The window tombs that surround the agape table suggest that it was an important feature of the catacomb. At least two of the window tombs are lavishly decorated with reliefs depicting palm fronds and other spiraled patterns. The palm fronds, together with a number of incised crosses, are proof of the Christian origins of the burial site.

== Gallery ==
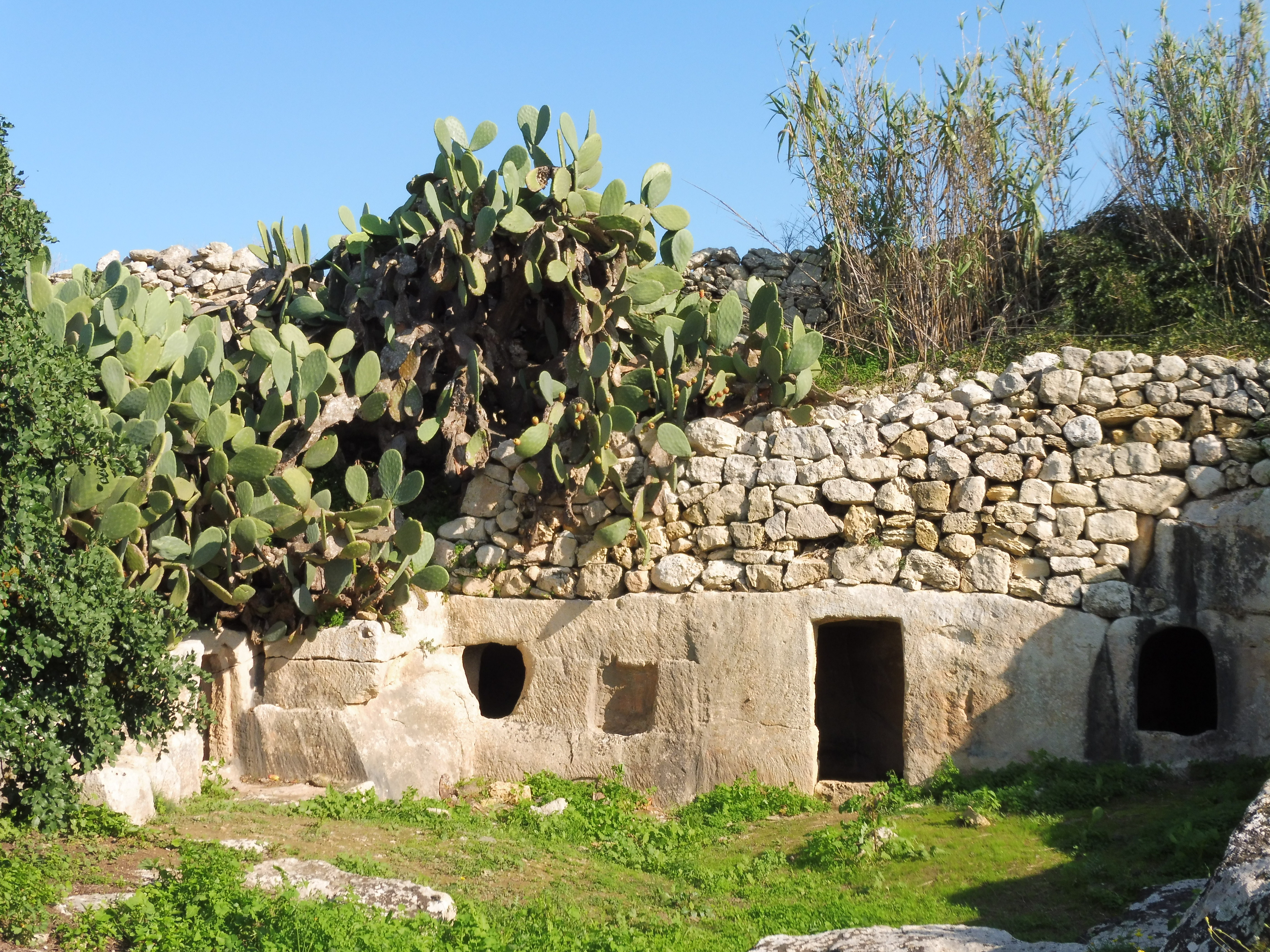
Salina Catacombs from the outside

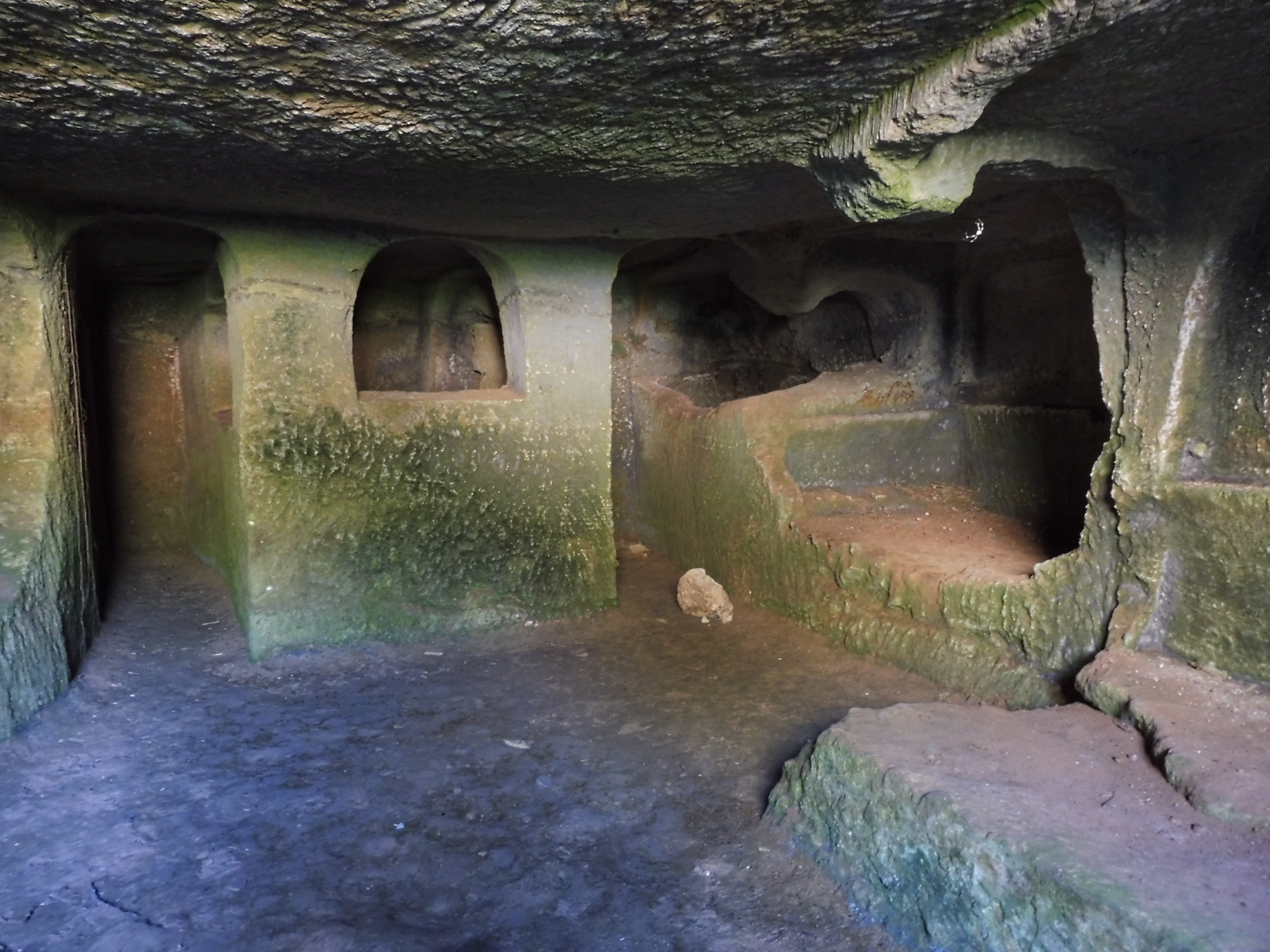
Inside the Catacombs

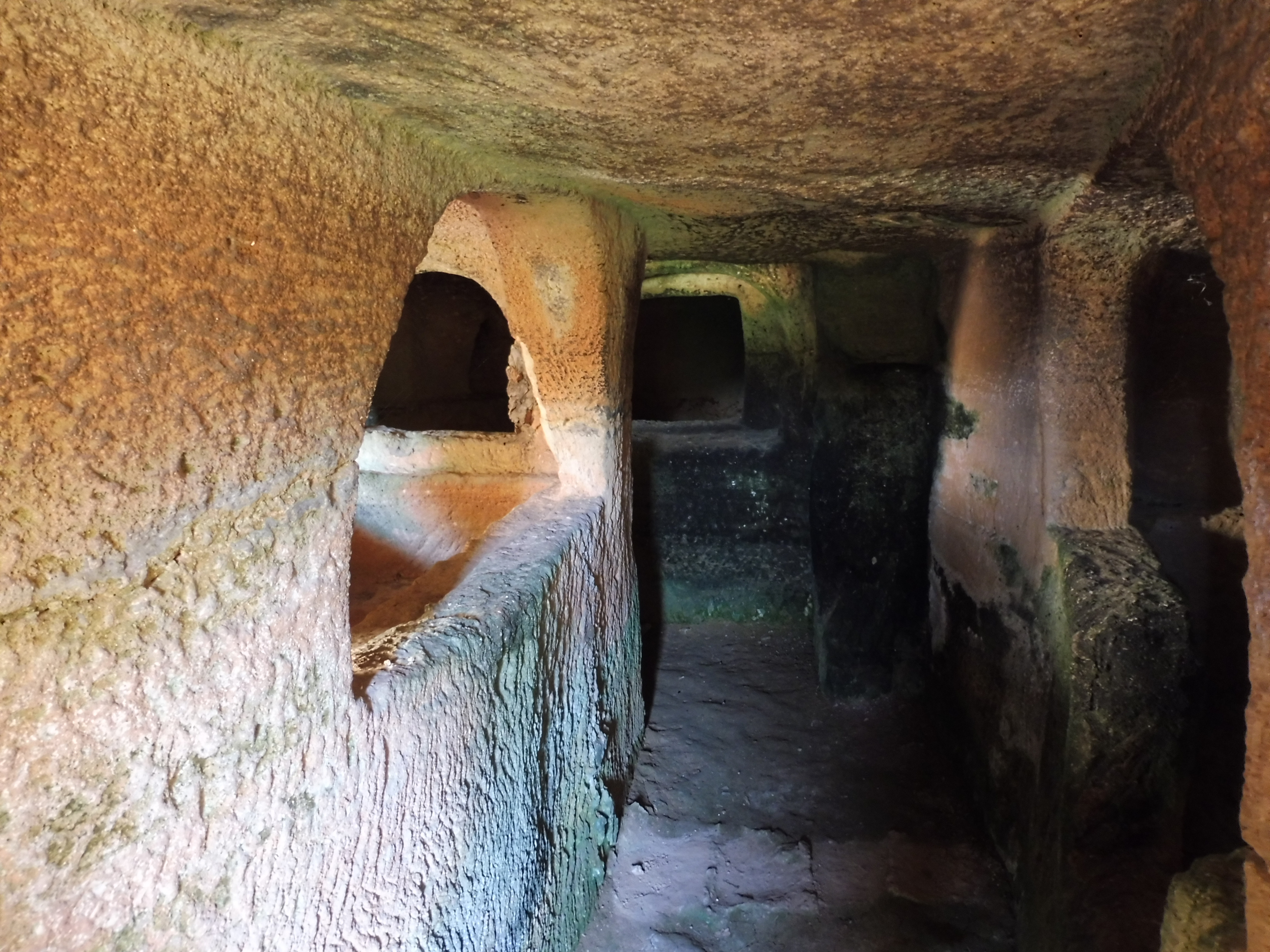
Inside the Catacombs

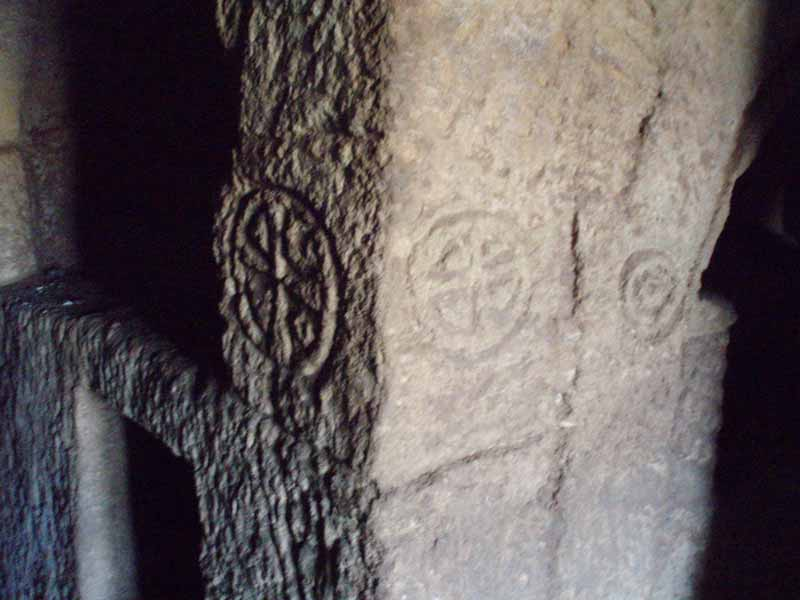
Crosses carved into the wall of the catacombs are proof of Christian burials

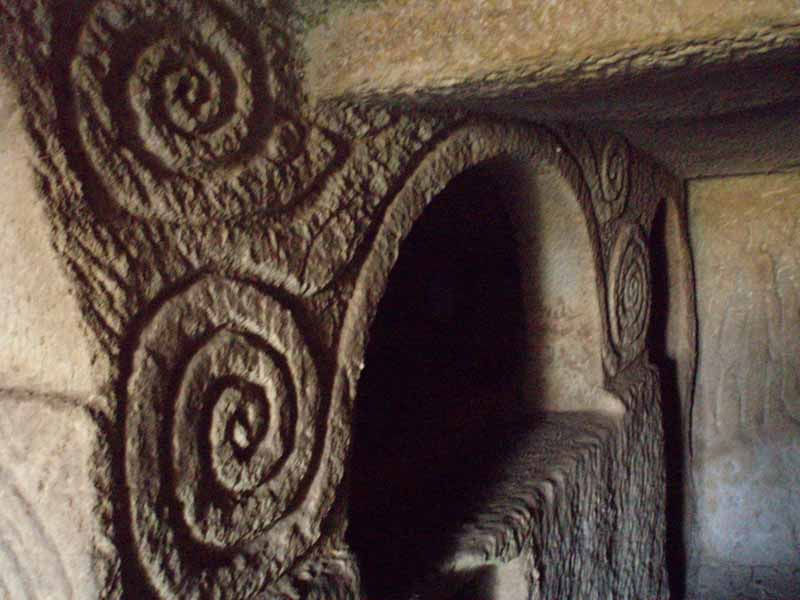
Spiraled reliefs adorn the walls of tombs

== See also ==
- Catacombs of Malta
- Salina, Malta
