= Tal-Mintna Catacombs =

4th-century tomb in Mqabba, Malta

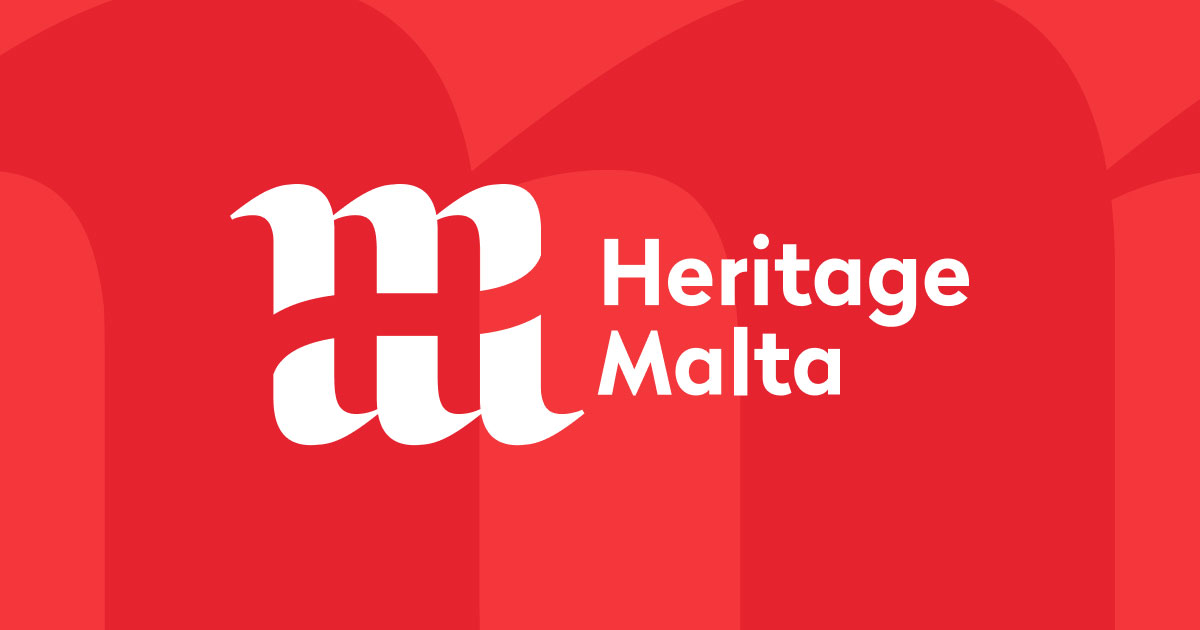
- Location: Mqabba, Malta
- Type: Catacombs
- Website: www.heritagemalta.org

The Tal-Mintna Catacombs are a hypogea complex in Mqabba, Malta. The complex dates to at least to the fourth century AD.

The site is managed by Heritage Malta and closed to the public for conservation.

== Structure and features ==
The site comprises three aligned hypogea dug side-by-side, originally accessed via separate stepped shafts but subsequently joined with narrow passages. Although each hypogeum is unique in its internal plan and arrangement, all the hypogea have in common a series of interconnecting galleries and numerous window tombs.

Although small compared to other catacombs like St. Paul's in Rabat, the catacombs of Tal-Mintna are among the best representations of rural catacombs in Malta. Window tombs are decorated with elaborately carved scallop-shells and embellished with decorated pilasters. The wall of one small hypogeum features an altar flanked by large pillars carved in relief, on one of which is engraved with illustrations often interpreted to be a face and a kind of palette.

Although unfinished, the central hypogeum offers one of the best-preserved examples of a triclinium agape table to be found in the late-Roman burials of Malta. The table is uniquely equipped with set of eight pyramidal shaped holes that were probably intended to hold lamps.

== Christian use ==
The window tombs of the Tal-Minta Catacombs bring to mind both Punic and Christian traditions; it is not clear if the burials were originally Christian, or converted to Christian use at a later date. The architectural similarities between late-Punic tombs and Christian hypogea in Malta suggest that the underground burials of early Christians took on Punico-Roman traditions and gave them new significance.

Although the agape table, a common feature of early Christian burials, and altar indicate that the place may have at some point been used for Christian burials, no clear Christian iconography survives in any of the three hypogea.

The discovery of other hypogea, mostly of Christian orientation, around Mqabba suggests that the area was once the location of a sizeable community. However, very few of these small hypogea survive; the closest burials are located at al Ħal Resqun, Luqa and Ta' Kandja.

Although the site was certainly in use sometime around the 4th century AD, the lack of surviving finds makes any clear dating impossible. It is thus likewise impossible to know when the three hypogea fell into disuse. It is also unclear whether the well that was dug through one of the hypogea was placed there intentionally to use the cavities that the hypogea offered or whether it hit upon them accidentally. Certainly, the fact that they were connected to provide more water storage capabilities implies that their location was known.

== Discovery and excavation ==
The catacombs were discovered in 1860 by Dr Antonio Annetto Caruana and Captain Walter Strickland. At the time the catacombs could only be accessed from a well.

The catacombs were surveyed sometime after 1882 and by 1913 three small rooms had been built to cover the entrances. They were included on the Antiquities List of 1925.

There is no record of artefacts discovered in the three hypogea. While it is possible that the tombs were despoiled of their material, the clearing of debris, bone and artefacts might also be connected to their Christian transformation.

== See also ==
- Catacombs of Malta
