= San Pawl Milqi =

Archaeological Site in Malta

Coordinates: 35.933333°N 14.411778°E

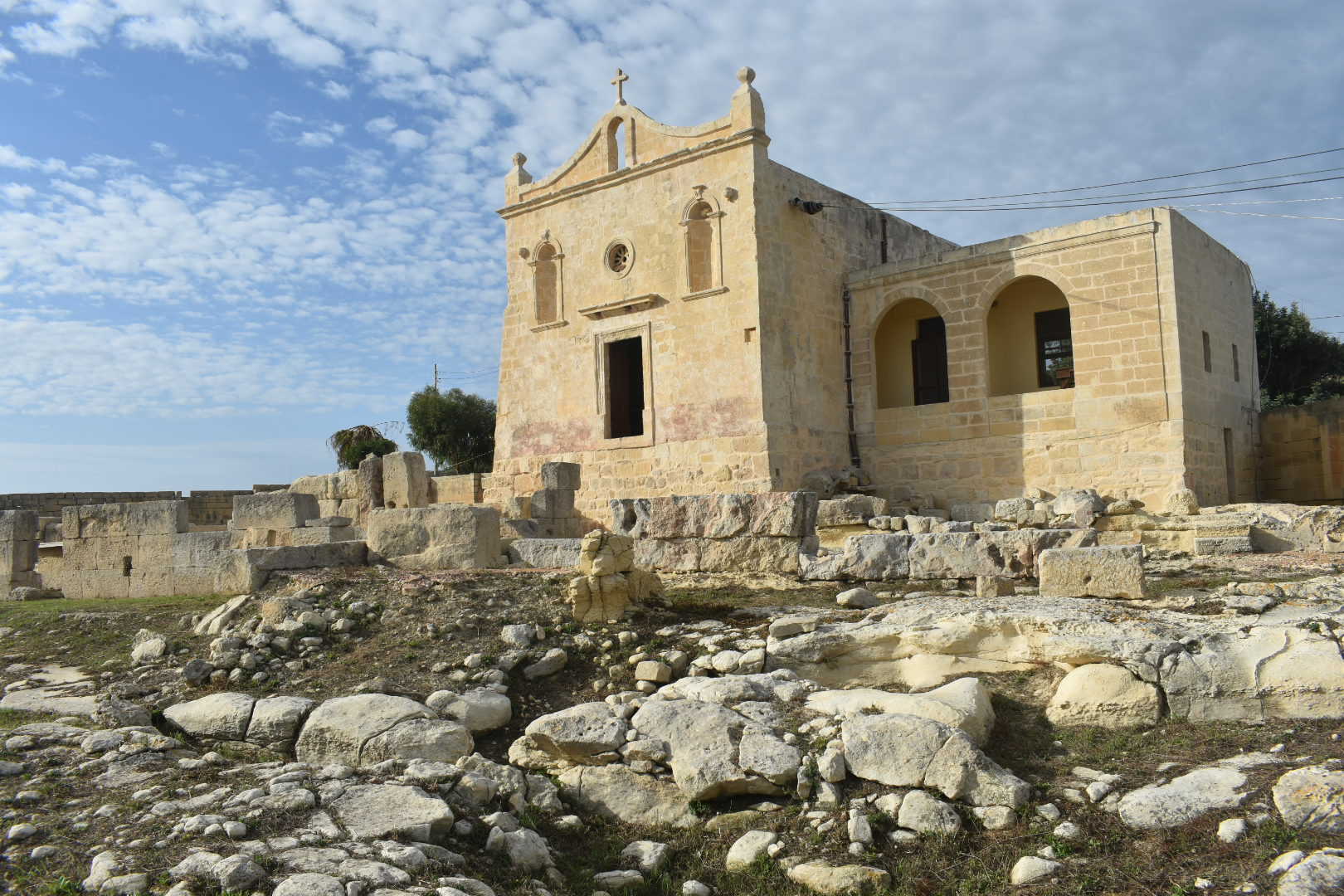
- Roman remains at San Pawl Milqi
- Location: Burmarrad, St. Paul's Bay, Malta
- Type: Roman villa
- Website: www.heritagemalta.org

San Pawl Milqi ("Saint Paul the welcome or the healer" in maltese) are the ruins of a Roman period agricultural villa and pagan temple, the largest ever discovered in Malta. A Christian church was built on the site based on the Biblical mention of the shipwreck of Saint Paul on the island. In the place of the current chapel there was a temple dedicated to the Greek god Apollo and a Roman villa. According to religious tradition, the villa is where Saint Publius, Governor and first Bishop of Malta, received Saint Paul after his shipwreck.

Apart from the account of the Acts of the Apostles there are no other authors who narrate the episode and no later writer complements the tradition. There has even been a controversy about whether the event occurred in Malta, since the Greek text says Melite (traditionally understood as Malta).

There is no archaeological evidence in support of Christian claims, and it is considered a name dating to the Middle Ages. Evidence of Christian worship on the site only dates back to the building of the first chapel in the fourteenth century. According to Anthony Bonanno, archeological research in the entire area of St Paul’s Bay found no evidence of the Christian tradition related to the supposed shipwreck in the area.

== History ==
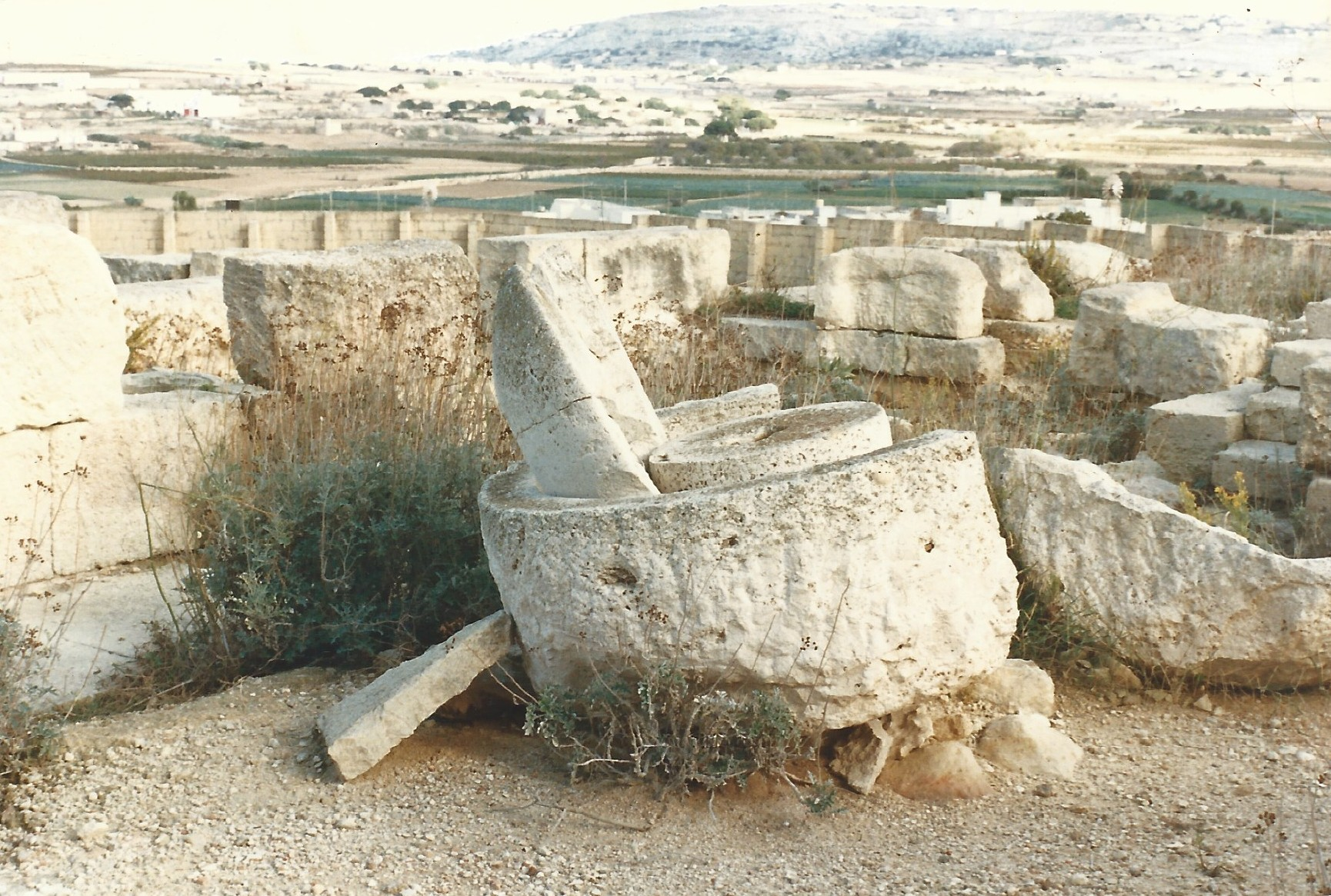
Olive-related equipment at the site.

The site has been in use since prehistoric times; a couple of tombs date back to the Zebbug and possibly the Borg in-Nadur phases of the Maltese Bronze Age.

The first building on the site was probably built in the Phoenician-Punic period, when the site was used intermittently for agriculture. A small number of structures remain from this period and one burial bears a neo-Punic inscription.

In the Roman period, the site’s position on the slopes of a fertile valley and vicinity to the Roman harbour at Salina meant that it was ideally suited to the production of olive oil. The establishment was expanded; the original central courtyard was transformed into an industrial area. The trapetum (a rotating mill used to separate pips from olive fruit), anchor points and at least two presses can still be seen, as well as a set of settling vats used to purify oil.

Although large enough to have been the property of a rich aristocrat, the villa does not contain any residential quarters of any particular richness. The four rooms which can be identified as serving residential needs were, in fact, only decorated with painted wall plasters and common cocciopesto flooring.

The site was eventually reduced in size and surrounded by a thick fortification wall. This wall was erected circa the third century A.D. by the Romans as a mean for defence from invaders. Its fortified walls, constant water supply and good position meant that it was ideally located to control the nearby port and valleys.

During the Arab period the site was majorly destroyed due to sea invasions and attacks. The Arabs decided to use the remains to fortify the site with limited construction techniques.

A church was built on part of the site in the fourteenth century, but after more than a century it fell into disuse and in 1616 was replaced by a church dedicated to the welcoming of St. Paul. This church, which still stands today, is the oldest record connecting the site to the traditional event.

== Excavation ==
Although the remains of the villa have long been well known, scientific excavations, led by the Missione Archeologica Italiana a Malta, did not commence until 1963. The final report on these excavations is yet to be published.

The site was included on the Antiquities List of 1925.

== Today ==
Today, the site is managed by Heritage Malta and closed to the public except for annual occasions.
