= Ta' Kola Windmill =

- Il-Mitħna ta' Kola
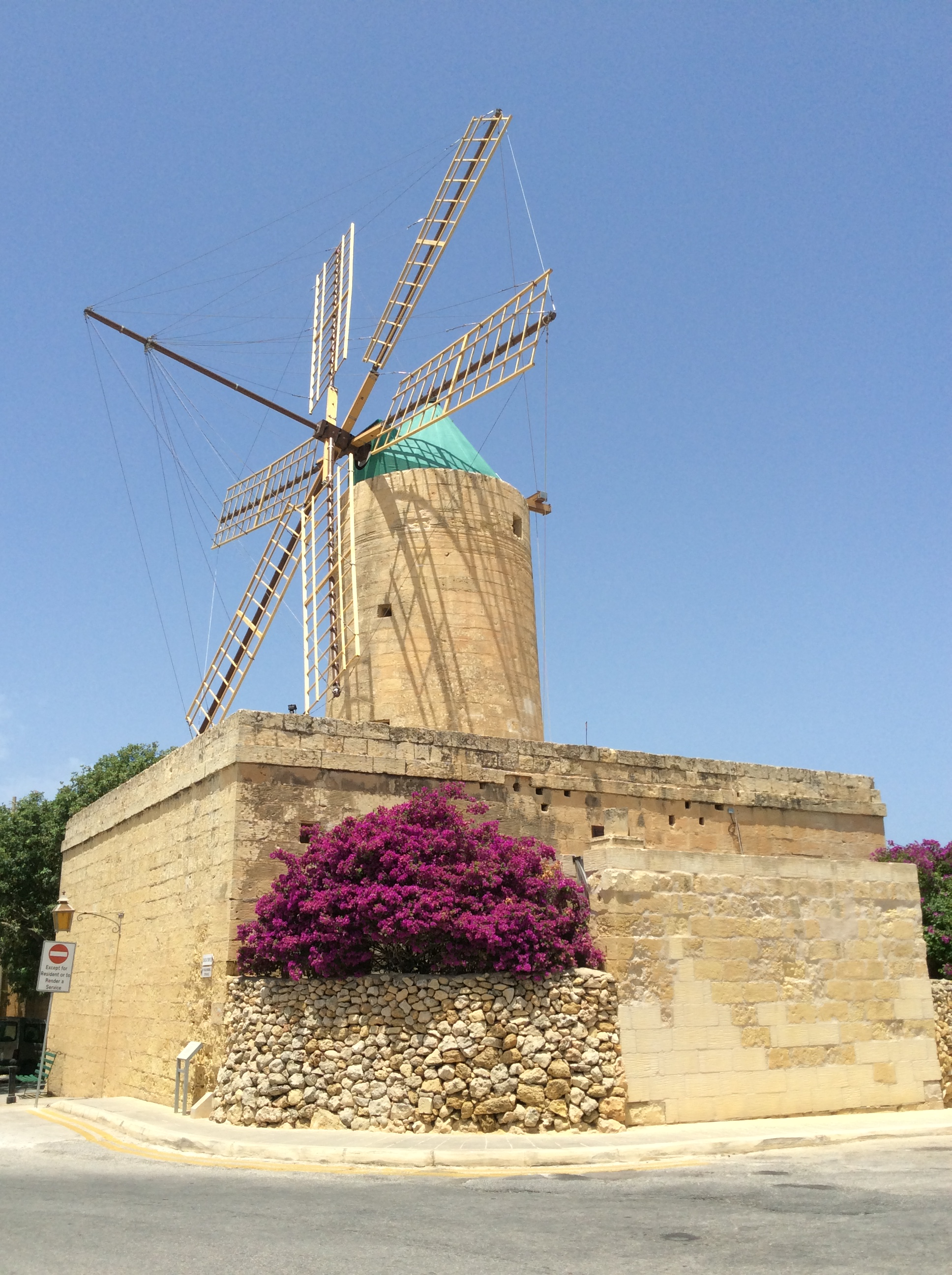
- Ta' Kola Windmill in 2017
- Interactive map of the Ta' Kola Windmill area

General information
- Status: Grade I listing
- Type: Windmill
- Location: Triq Marija Bambina, Xagħra, Gozo, Malta
- Coordinates: 36°02′58″N 14°15′57″E
- Completed: 1725
- Renovated: 1780s
- Owner: Heritage Malta

Ta' Kola Windmill, Maltese: Il-Mitħna ta' Kola, is a windmill in the village of Xagħra, on the island of Gozo in the Maltese archipelago. It was built in 1725 by the Fondazione Vilhena of Grand Master Manoel de Vilhena, and was rebuilt in the 1780s. It became a museum in 1992.

Like many other Maltese windmills, it has a round central tower surrounded by a number of rooms. The sails and milling machinery have been restored, as have the miller's living-quarters. The museum also contains a large collection of traditional tools, mostly for wood- and iron-working.
