= Heritage Malta =

Maltese government agency

- Patrimonju Malta
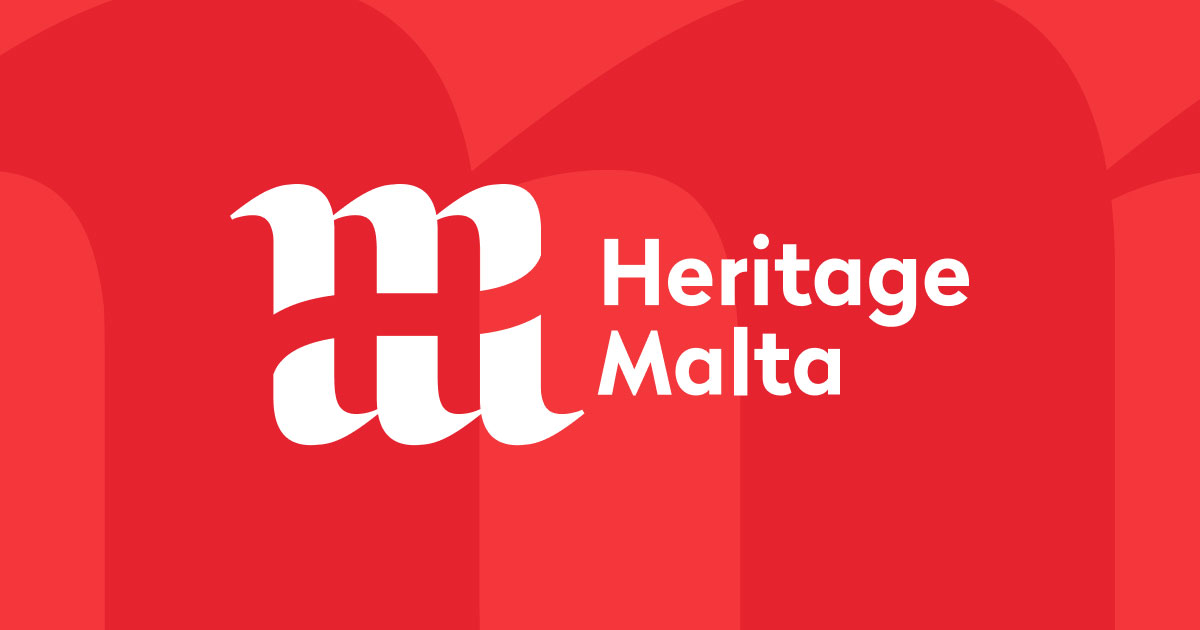
- Ensuring a Future to our Past

Agency overview
- Formed: 2002
- Jurisdiction: Government of Malta
- Headquarters: Villa Bighi, Kalkara, Malta
- Minister responsible: Owen Bonnici, minister for the national heritage, the arts and local government
- Agency executive: Mario Cutajar, Chairman
- Website: heritagemalta.mt

Heritage Malta (Maltese: Patrimonju Malta) is the Maltese national agency for museums, conservation practice and cultural heritage. Created by the Cultural Heritage Act, enacted in 2002, the national agency (along with the Superintendence for Cultural Heritage) replaced the former Museums Department.

Originally Heritage Malta was entrusted with the management of museums, sites and their collections but in 2005, the agency was also charged with the take over of the former Malta Centre for Restoration to become the national agency responsible for conservation.

As the national agency responsible for museums, cultural heritage and conservation, Heritage Malta is governed by a board of directors appointed by the minister. The board is headed by a chairman and is usually appointed for successive three-year terms.

== Logo ==
Until 2022, the logo of Heritage Malta consisted of a white uppercase Ħ on a red square. The H with stroke is a letter found only in the Maltese alphabet. In 2022, Heritage Malta changed its logo to a stylized lowercase "M" featuring a standard letter "H" in the middle, which was designed by the company BRND WGN. This new logo was noted for its similarity to that of the Hunter Museum of American Art.

== Sites protected by Heritage Malta ==
The following archaeological sites and historical buildings and structures are under the management of Heritage Malta. All Maltese megalithic temples listed below are inscribed on the UNESCO World Heritage List.

Site	Type	Now
Abbatija Tad-Dejr; A number of ancient paleochristian catacombs located in a plateau under the city of Rabat, near the ditch of Mdina. Dating between the late-Roman to the early-Byzantine periods, it is similar to the Hypogeum of Ħal-Saflieni, it houses one of the most important early Christian burial sites south of Rome. The tomb consists of four highly decorated hypogeas. A church hewn in the rock with a stone altar is also located in the complex.	catacombs	closed
Borġ in-Nadur; This is a four-apsed temple enclosed by a megalithic wall, located near Birżebbuġa. It is dated to approximately the 20th century BC."Borg in-Nadur - Ancient Temple in Malta in Mainland". The Megalithic Portal and Megalith Map.	megalithic	open by request
Ġgantija Temples (UNESCO World Heritage Site); Situated on the island of Gozo, Ġgantija is a megalithic temple complex dating to the Neolithic ages. It is one of the world's oldest free-standing structures, as well as one of the oldest religious structures. Built approximately in the 36th century BC, Ġgantija pre-dates Stonehenge and the Egyptian Pyramids.	megalithic	open
Għajn Tuffieħa Roman Baths; Discovered by workmen constructing a water works in 1929, the thermae at Għajn Tuffieħa is a classic landmark of Rome's domination on the Maltese Islands. Although the site is mainly in ruin, it is famous for its elaborate mosaics.	Roman	closed
Għar Dalam Cave and Museum; This cave, one kilometre north of Birżebbuġa, housed evidence of the earliest human occupation of the Maltese Islands which dates back approximately 7,400 years. Remains of earlier Ice Age animals have also been excavated and presented in the nearby museum. The cave had an important role in World War II, when it was used first as an air-raid shelter before being used as a fuel depot.	neolithic	open
Ħaġar Qim Temples (UNESCO World Heritage Site); Two kilometres south-west of Qrendi, Ħaġar Qim is a temple dating between the 32nd and 25th centuries BC. It is a typical example of the unique Maltese temple architecture for its time, with elaborate carvings and façades. The most famous discovery at Ħaġar Qim was a number of small "fat lady" statues, which is on display at Valletta's National Museum of Archaeology.	megalithic	open
Hypogeum of Ħal-Saflieni (UNESCO World Heritage Site); This archaeological site is the only subterranean prehistoric temple in the world, dating to the 25th century BC. The complex comprises several dozen rooms in three levels, and was used mainly for ceremonial burials and other religious duties.	megalithic	open
Mnajdra Temples (UNESCO World Heritage Site); Located near the Ħaġar Qim temples, Mnajdra is situated in a hollow near the cliffs of Malta's south-eastern coast. It dates to the same era as Ħaġar Qim, and its decorations and carvings are similar. It is among the best preserved archaeological sites in Malta.	megalithic	open
Skorba Temples (UNESCO World Heritage Site); This site is a complex of two temples situated near Zebbiegħ in Mġarr. As the remains been left virtually untouched during excavations, Skorba is one of the most complete temple complexes on the island, which includes pitted floors and steps, as well as a coralline limestone slab nearly four metres high. The first temple dates between the 36th and 32nd centuries BC with the second, more ruinous temple built approximately 600 years afterwards. There are also a number of Neolithic huts, located west of the first temple.	megalithic	open
St. Paul's Catacombs; Located at Rabat, Malta, these early tunnels and subterranean rooms were used for Christian ceremonial burials. They date back to the 3rd century and consists of a number of crypts over an area of 2,200m².	catacombs	open
Salina Catacombs; Located near Salina, Naxxar, they date to the late Roman to Byzantine period and were used for early Christian rituals.	catacombs	open by request
San Pawl Milqi; The largest and best preserved Roman villas in Malta is located at Burmarrad, next to and underneath a 17th-century chapel dedicated to Saint Paul. This site is open only on request.	Roman	open by request
The State Rooms; They are situated within the Grandmaster's Palace in the capital city of Valletta and were part of the official residence of the Grandmaster of the Knights of Malta.	architecture	open
Ta' Ħaġrat Temples (UNESCO World Heritage Site); Located a kilometre from Skorba Temples, it is a well-preserved complex of two temples dating between the 36th to 32nd centuries BC. Ta' Ħagrat may have been built on the site of an ancient village, for a number of pots have been excavated here. The most distinctive find here is a small limestone statue of an ancient building.	megalithic	open
Ta' Kola Windmill; Built in 1725 during the reign of the Knights of Malta by Grandmaster António Manoel de Vilhena, and then rebuilt in 1787, the windmill at Xagħra, Gozo gives visitors a taste of life in the small island during the 18th century.	architecture	open
Tal-Mintna Catacombs; As with St. Paul's Catacombs the catacombs at Tal-Mintna is an early Christian underground burial complex, located at Mqabba. It is known for its elaborate scallop-shaped decorations carved over its window tombs, as well as eight pyramidal "lamp-holes" opposite an agape table.	catacombs	open by request
Tarxien Temples (UNESCO World Heritage Site); These temples, which date between the 36th to 25th centuries BC, are located in the heart of Tarxien and depict a number of decorative carvings of domesticated animals carved in reliefs and the temple's altar. The site may have been used for animal sacrifices and other rituals.	megalithic	open
Tas-Silġ; This is a pair of temples near Marsaxlokk that contain the ruins of four different structures from different eras; one from the Tarxien temples period (30th to 25th centuries BC), a Bronze Age settlement, a Greco-Punic temple dedicated to Astarte and an early Christian church dating to the 4th to 6th centuries.	Roman	closed

== Museums run by Heritage Malta ==
- Gozo Museum of Archaeology, Citadella at Victoria, Gozo
- Gran Castello Historic House, Citadella at Victoria, Gozo
- National Museum of Ethnography, Birgu
- Malta Maritime Museum, Birgu
- National Museum of Fine Arts, Valletta
- National Museum of Archaeology, Valletta
- National Museum of Natural History, Mdina
- National War Museum, Valletta
- Natural Science Museum, Citadella at Victoria, Gozo
- Old Prison, Citadella at Victoria, Gozo
- Palace Armoury, Valletta
- Domvs Romana, Rabat
- Ta' Kola Windmill, Xagħra, Gozo
