= Catacombs of Malta =

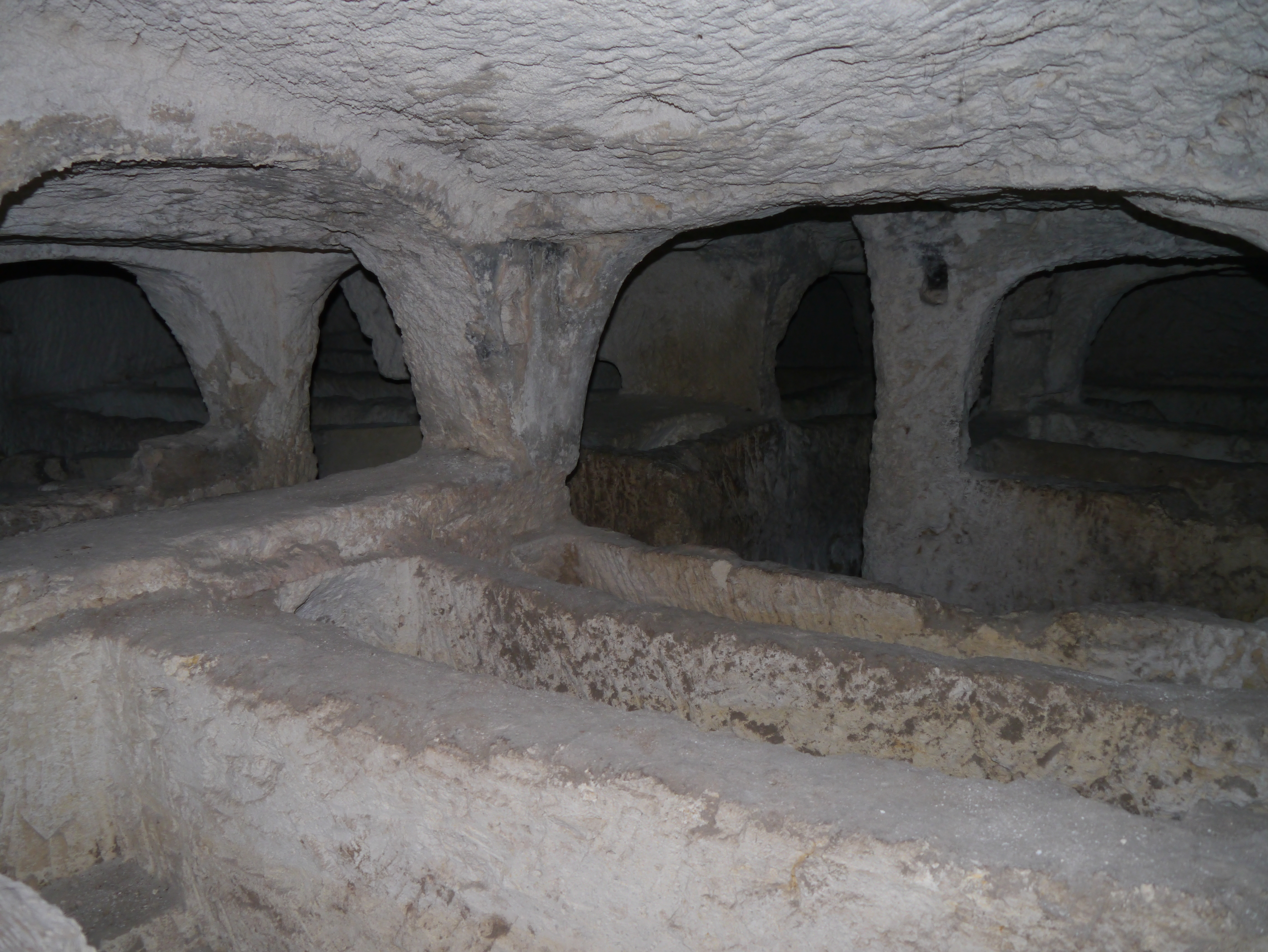
St. Paul's Catacombs

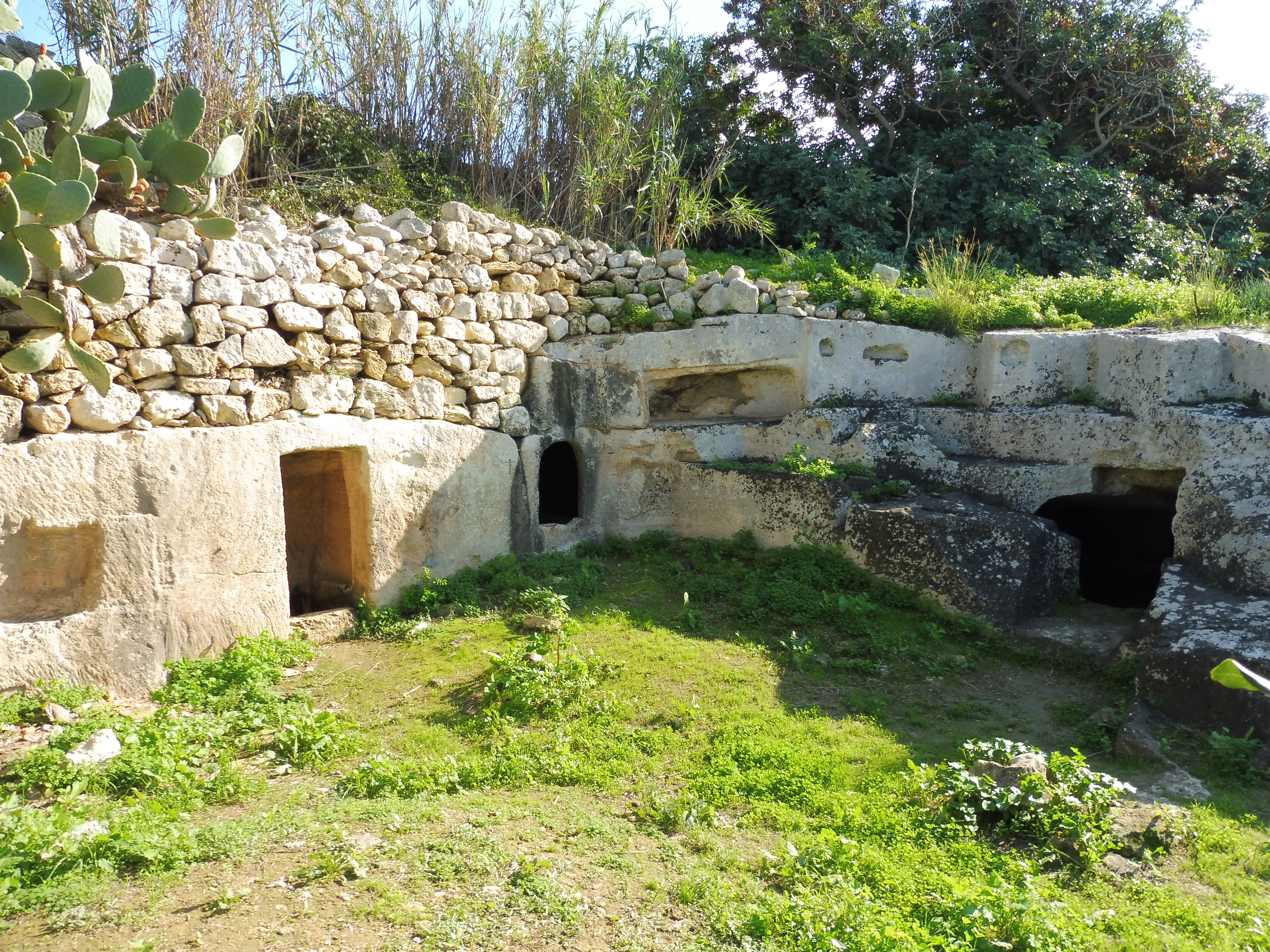
Entrances to the Salina Catacombs

There are hundreds of catacombs in Malta, principally found in Mdina, the former capital of the island. The catacombs are very small, but are in good preservation.

Many of the catacombs were included on the Antiquities List of 1925.

Vincent Zammit notes that catacombs developed from earlier rock-cut tombs. Wherever burial places were discovered, it is generally presumed that a small community lived in the area. The catacombs are characterised by spaciousness, a smaller extent than those found in other countries, similar in types of tombs to others found around the Mediterranean, but having their own particular type of decorations. Decorations, nevertheless, are rare, which may indicate that with the exception of a few families who had their own private tombs, the community was not wealthy.

Prof. George Cassar observed that the catacombs of Malta have educational value. "They are the key to the understanding of the development of religious rites and beliefs and indicate the birth and spread of Christianity among the small community of Maltese living on the islands. This mysterious yet concrete environment helps towards the creation of a pedagogical setting which the educator can utilise to the full."

== Catacombs of Malta ==
The catacombs include:

- Tal-Mintna Catacombs – Mqabba, Malta
- St. Paul's Catacombs – Rabat, Malta
- St. Agatha's Catacombs – Rabat, Malta
- Salina Catacombs – Naxxar, Malta
- St Augustine's Catacombs – Rabat, Malta
- Ta' Bistra Catacombs – near Mosta, Malta
- St. Cataldus Catacombs – Rabat, Malta.

There are many other catacombs in Malta.

== Bibliography ==
- Prof. Sir T. Zammit (1980). Union Press (ed.). The St. Paul's Catacombs - and other rock-cut tombs in malta. Valletta, Malta. p. 34..
