= Is-Salina =

Is-Salina Is-Salini
- Village
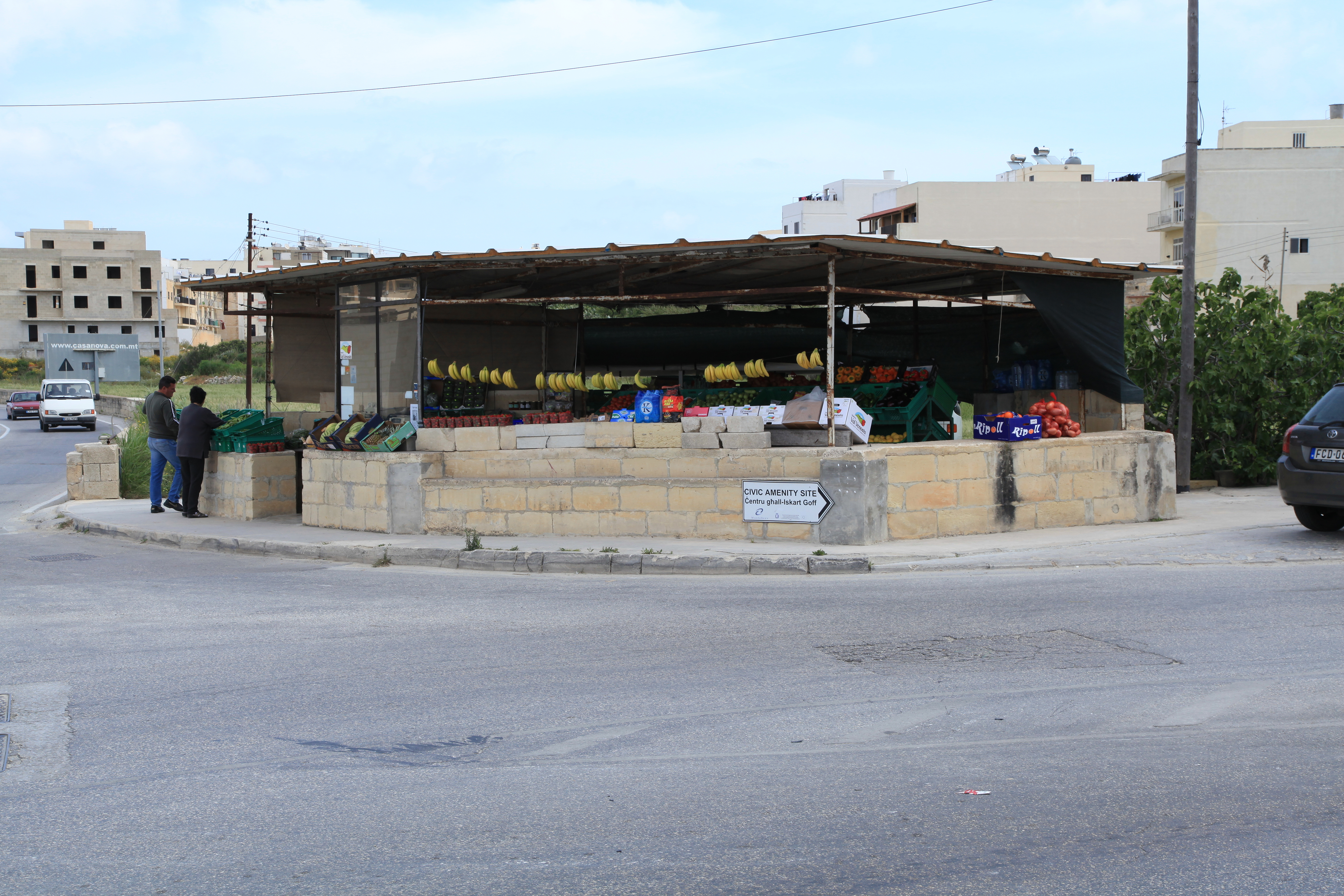

- Location of Is-Salina in Malta
- Coordinates: 35°56′44″N 14°25′28″E
- Country: Malta
- Island: Malta Island
- Suburb of: Naxxar
- Time zone: UTC+1 (CET)
  - Summer (DST): UTC+2 (CEST)
- Postal code: NXR
- Dialing code: 356
- Day of festa: September 8
- Website: Official website

Salina (Is-Salini) is a village in Malta. Salina borders the villages of Baħar iċ-Ċagħaq, Magħtab, the small city of Naxxar and St. Paul's Bay. Salina is mostly known for its salt pans and the Salina Catacombs. The word salini means salt pans in Maltese.

Landmarks of Salina

== History ==
Salina Bay was a port of some importance in Roman times, and the inlet once reached further inland than it does today. Cart ruts that may date to the Bronze Age follow the contours of the bay. The area around the bay also holds the prehistoric Tal-Qadi Temple and a cluster of early Christian burial chambers.

=== Salt pans ===
The Order of St John built the Salina salt pans in the 16th century, according to BirdLife Malta and the Maltese government; Heritage Malta and Buhagiar give the 17th century. Another account places their construction in the years after the Great Siege of Malta of 1565. Salt from the pans was exported to Europe, and the system was among the first products Malta made at a proto-industrial scale. Production later declined and many Maltese salt pans fell into disuse. The Salina pans were restored in a project of about €7 million, part-funded by the European Union.

=== Fireworks factory explosions ===
The Lourdes fireworks factory on Triq il-Qadi, in the Tal-Qadi area, has exploded twice. In May 2018 an explosion injured three people, one seriously. On 1 June 2026, at about 6:30 am, a larger explosion destroyed the factory and set off further blasts that continued for hours. No workers were on site. Two men working in nearby fields and a food courier had minor injuries, and four cows were killed. The blast broke windows and doors in the surrounding area, scattered rocks over Triq is-Salini, which was closed, and led to the evacuation of nearby residents.

== Landmarks ==
=== Salina Nature Reserve ===
The restored pans are now the Salina Nature Reserve (also called Salina Nature Park, or the bird park), run by BirdLife Malta. The site covers about 154,000 square metres of saline marshland and salt pans, and birds often stop there to rest during migration. Three timber huts, rebuilt in the style of the original salt-works huts, stand on the site, and one serves as the visitor centre. A restored wetland on the Kennedy Grove side of the reserve has also been opened to visitors. Malta's first Salt Museum opened there in July 2024, a joint project of the Environment and Resources Authority, Ambjent Malta and BirdLife Malta. The reserve is open every day, entry is free, and parking is available on the Coast Road. BirdLife also harvests food-certified salt on site each summer.

=== Ximenes Redoubt ===
Ximenes Redoubt, also known as Salina Right Redoubt, is a coastal fortification the Knights built in 1715–1716. Rectangular warehouses were added later to store salt from the nearby pans, the last of them in the 1770s under Grand Master Ximenes. It lies within the Salina Nature Reserve.

=== Tal-Qadi Temple ===
The Tal-Qadi Temple is a megalithic temple on Tal-Qadi hill between Salina and Burmarrad. It was built during the Tarxien phase, between 3300 and 3000 BC, and is the only Maltese temple that faces north-east. Themistocles Zammit first excavated it in 1927. The temple is in poor condition and only its outline remains visible.

=== Salina Catacombs ===
The Salina Catacombs are a group of more than 15 small Paleochristian hypogea, mostly cut into a quarry in the Ta' Latnija area. Their carved decoration suggests a degree of local wealth. The site is managed by Heritage Malta and can only be visited by appointment, accompanied by a Heritage Malta staff member.

== Hotels ==
The Salini Resort is a four-star hotel on Salina Bay.
