= Superintendence for Cultural Heritage =

- Sovrintendenza tal-Patrimonju Kulturali

Agency overview
- Formed: 2002
- Jurisdiction: Government of Malta
- Headquarters: Valletta, Malta
- Minister responsible: Hon. Owen Bonnici MP, Minister for the National Heritage, the Arts and Local Government
- Agency executive: Kurt Farrugia, Superintendent

The Superintendence of Cultural Heritage is the Maltese national agency for regulation, protection and accessibility of cultural heritage. Created by the Cultural Heritage act, enacted in 2002, the national agency replaced the former Museum Department along with Heritage Malta.

The Superintendence is responsible for the surveillance of activities related to the control, direction, monitoring, regulation, investigation and recording of cultural heritage in Malta.

== History ==
Two laws governing heritage issues were enacted in the 1990s. The first was the Environment Protection Act (No V of 1991), the second The Environment and Planning Development Act (No 1 of 1992), which aims to regulate and establish modern planning procedures. The latter established critical principles of scheduling and grading of historic buildings, and introduced the concepts of urban conservation areas and protective zoning. The Grand Harbour Local Plan (realised by the Malta Environment and Planning Authority), in force since 2002, contains policies that specifically protect the World Heritage property

The Cultural Heritage Act (No VI of 2002, am. 2005) paved the way for the formation of three entities, namely the Superintendence of Cultural Heritage, Heritage Malta and the Malta Centre for Restoration (which was merged with Heritage Malta in 2005). The Act also provides for the creation of Religious Cultural Heritage Commissions, which have the same powers and responsibilities as the Superintendent of Cultural Heritage. However, the latter has no jurisdiction over Church property.

== Functions ==
Functions of the Superintendence for Cultural Heritage include:

- Heritage Planning Consultation
- Built Heritage Restoration Monitoring
- National Inventory and Scheduling
- Archaeological Monitoring
- Archaeological Research and Investigations
- Underwater Cultural Heritage
- Movement of Cultural Heritage Items
- Guardianship for Heritage Sites
- Monitoring of Movable Heritage Conservation
- National and International Obligarions
- Policy Development
- Restoration Bonds

== Publications ==
- Mercieca Spiteri, Bernardette; Spiteri, Cynthianne; Borda, Kevin; Farrugia, Kurt; Spadaro, Paolo. The Superintendence of Cultural Heritage: 20 Years of Discoveries 2003-2022. Superintendence of Cultural Heritage. ISBN 9789918013845.
