= Abbatija Tad-Dejr =

Paleochristian burial site in Rabat, Malta

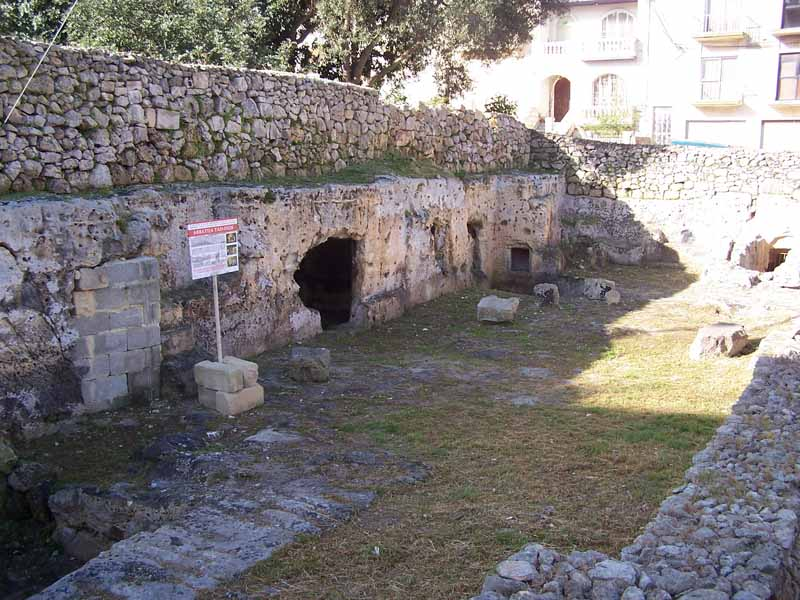
- An outside view of Abbatija Tad-Dejr catacombs
- Location: Rabat, Malta
- Type: Hypogeum
- Website: www.heritagemalta.org

The Abbatija Tad-Dejr hypogeal complex is a paleochristian burial site in Rabat, Malta.

Although much smaller in size than those of Rome, the catacombs in Malta, especially the ones in Rabat, are among the most important early Christian burial sites south of Rome.

The site is managed by Heritage Malta and is currently closed for conservation.

== History ==
The early catacombs comprised a singular shaft and chamber tombs dug from the vertical face of a quarry. Between the fourth and the ninth centuries AD, four larger complexes were added.

The most important of the four small catacombs is the largest one; with its rows of carefully placed baldacchino tombs, it is possibly one of the few catacombs that saw some sort of pre-planning during excavations. Baldacchino tombs are often considered to be the richest out of the array of tomb types found in Maltese catacombs; at least three such tombs in this complex are heavily decorated with reliefs.

In the post-Roman period, the largest catacomb was enlarged and turned into a small church.

== Uses ==
The presence in the hypogeum of a stone altar and the number of crosses carved into the rock surface suggest early Christian use. A fresco that, until recently, decorated the apse over the supposed location of the original altar is now housed in the National Museum of Fine Arts.

The catacombs underwent various other phases of use, including as cow pens and for the quarrying of stone used in the production of lime. The latter has resulted in extensive damage. Some of the truncated shaft and chamber burials can be viewed from the low roof of the quarry.
