= St. Paul's Catacombs =

Christian catacombs in Malta

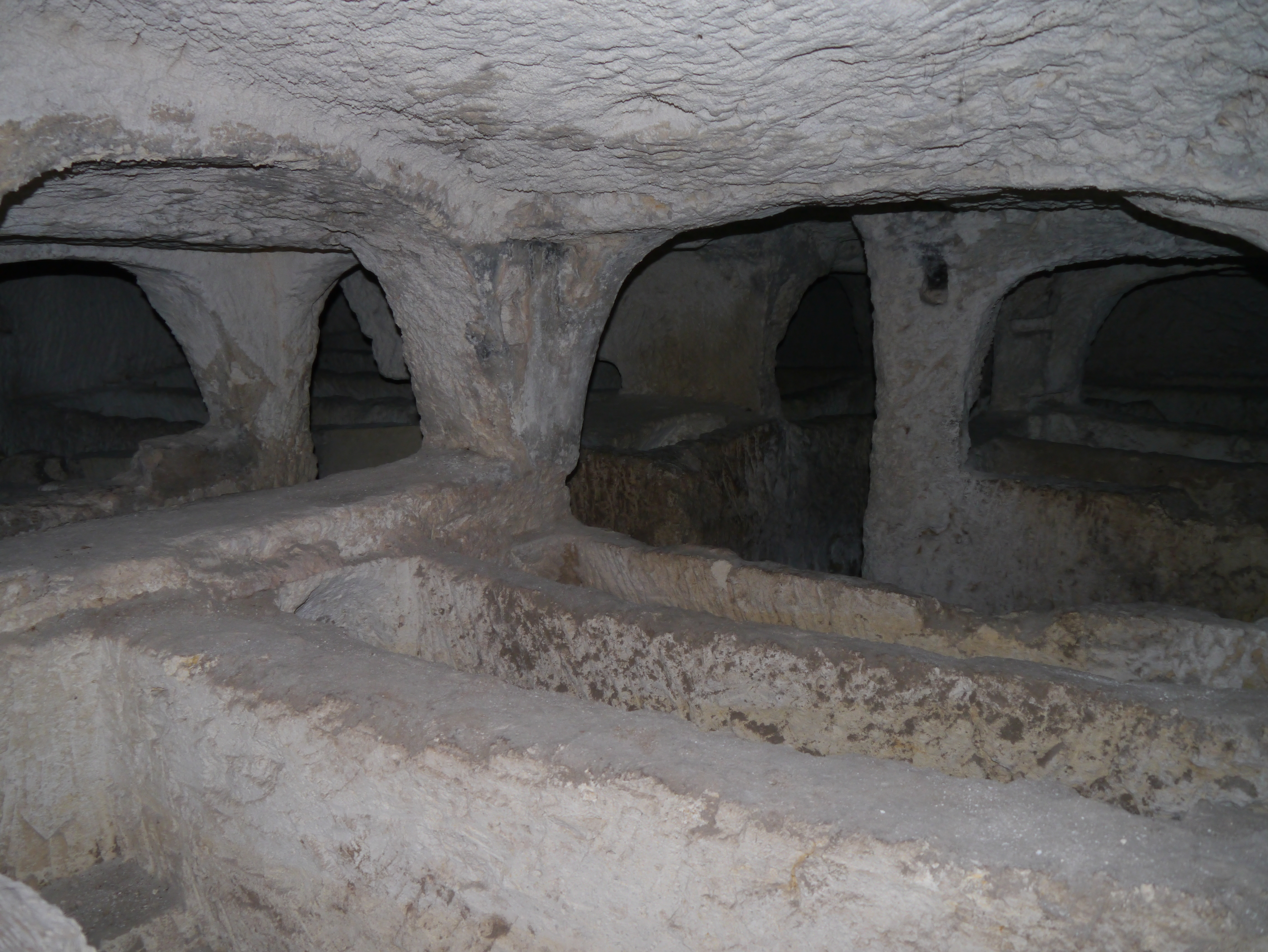
- Location: St. Agatha Street, Rabat, Malta
- Coordinates: 35.880690°N 14.397610°E
- Type: Catacombs
- Public transit access: Buses 51, 52, 53 from Valletta terminus
- Website: www.heritagemalta.org

St. Paul's Catacombs are some of the most prominent features of Malta's early Christianity archeology. The archeological clearing of the site has revealed an extensive system of underground galleries and tombs dating from the third to the eighth centuries CE.

The site was first fully investigated in 1894 by Dr. Antonio Annetto Caruana. It is now managed by Heritage Malta.

There are over 30 hypogea in the entire St. Paul's and St. Agatha's complex, over 20 of which are open to the public.

== History ==
St. Paul's catacombs are part of a large cemetery once located outside the walls of the ancient Roman city of Melite, now covered by the smaller Mdina and Rabat. It also comprises the catacombs of Saint Agatha, San Katald, St. Augustine, and many others.

The cemetery probably originated in the Phoenician-Punic period. As in Roman tradition, Phoenician and Punic burials were located outside city walls. The many tombs discovered in areas outside the known line of the Roman city suggest that the city of Melite was close to equal size.

The early tombs consisted of a deep rectangular shaft with one or two chambers dug from its sides. This type of burial was used well into the Roman occupation of the islands, but the chambers grew larger and more regular in shape over time. It is probable that this enlargement joined neighboring tombs and led to the creation of small catacombs, which became the norm by the fourth century CE.

The catacombs were in use until the seventh, possibly eighth century. Some of the catacombs were used again during the re-Christianization of the Island around the 13th century.

== Site ==
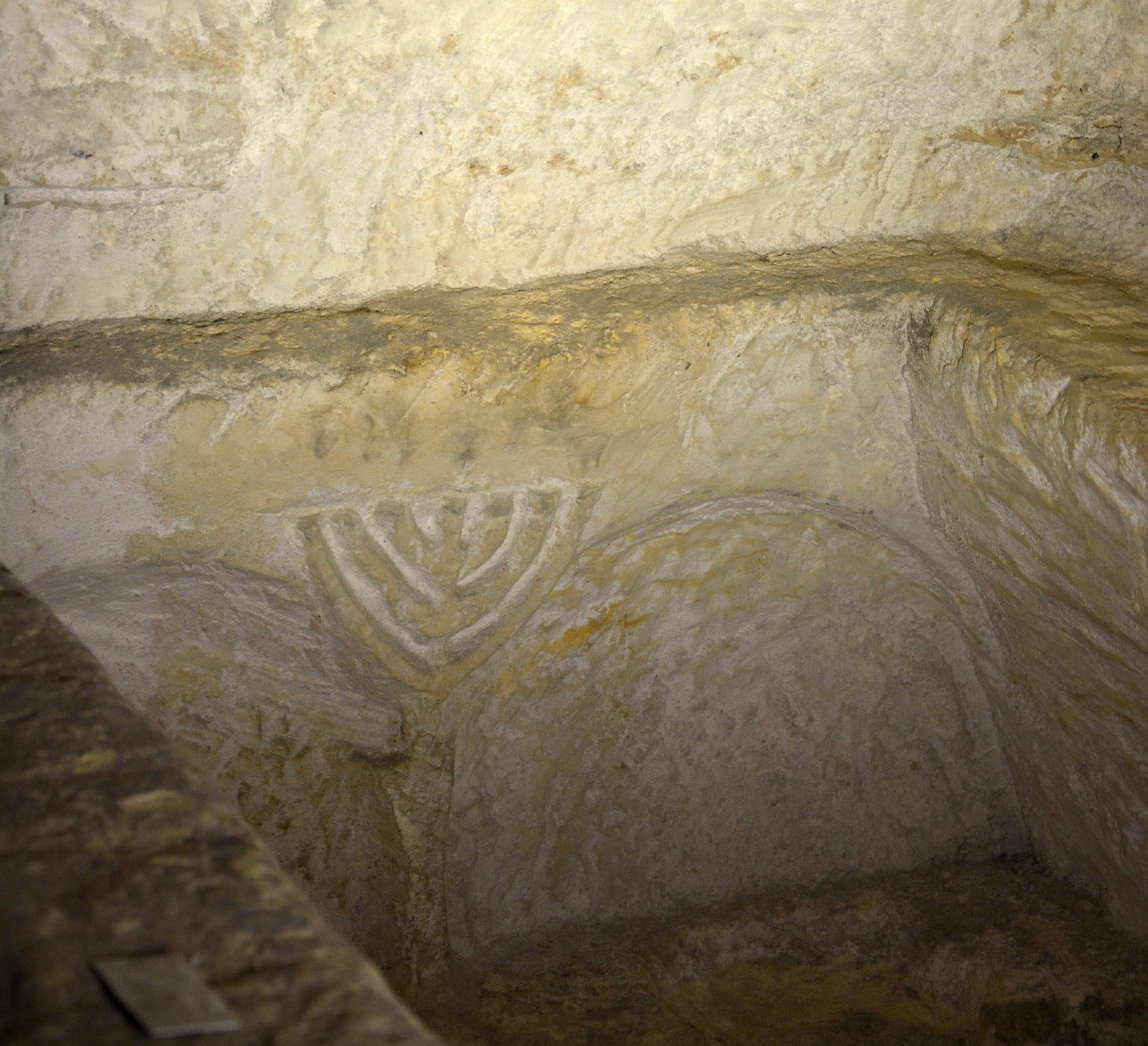
Menorah indicating the presence of Jewish burials

The site is open to the public every day from 09:00 until 17:00. Visitors can access over 20 of the catacombs in the St Paul's cluster. The main complex, covering an area of more than 2,000 square meters (22,000 sq ft), is so far the largest catacomb ever to be found on the island. It is large enough to have served as a communal burial ground in successive phases of Malta's history. The two halls at the bottom of the entrance stairs show two agape tables (circular tables hewn out of the living rock and used for ceremonial meals commemorating dead relatives).

Although the complex contains almost all of the burial types found in the Maltese repertoire, the best represented are so-called baldacchino tombs. These free-standing, canopied burials dominate the main corridors of the complex; their four elegant arches and supporting pillars are exemplary. Other decorations within this catacomb include illustrations and written messages in red paint.

Another catacomb is much smaller than the first. The surgical tools carved in relief on one of the three blocking stones in the inner chamber suggest that it was the burial place of a particular family or group of surgeons.

The 24 catacombs show evidence of Christian and Jewish burials side-by-side and no visible divisions.

A Jewish woman named Eulogia, the wife of the ''gerousiarch'' (council head), is identified in the catacombs as a ''presbytera'' (elder) and honored with the epithet 'lover of the Law'.

== Excavation and conservation ==
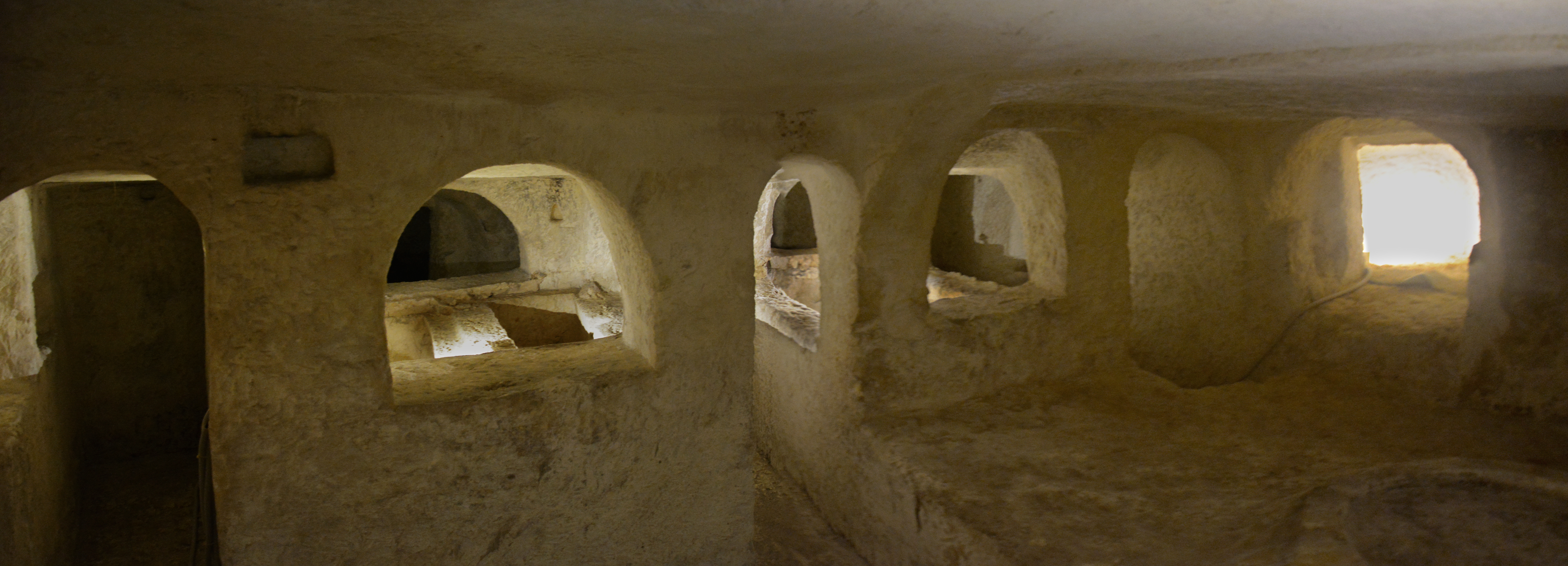
The catacombs

The excavation of the catacombs began in the late 1800s and, other than the construction of protective rooms, no further conservation was undertaken in the 20th century.

With funds from the European Union's European Regional Development Fund (Operational Program I—Cohesion Policy 2007–2013), Heritage Malta is performing extensive archeological and environmental research. Various other studies are planned for the future, culminating in the development of new visitor facilities as well as the opening to the public of most of the smaller catacombs.

== See also ==
- Catacombs of Malta
- Għar Għerduf catacombs
