= Raid on Mosta =

1526 pirate raid on Mosta, Malta

Coordinates: 35°54′8″N 14°25′25″E

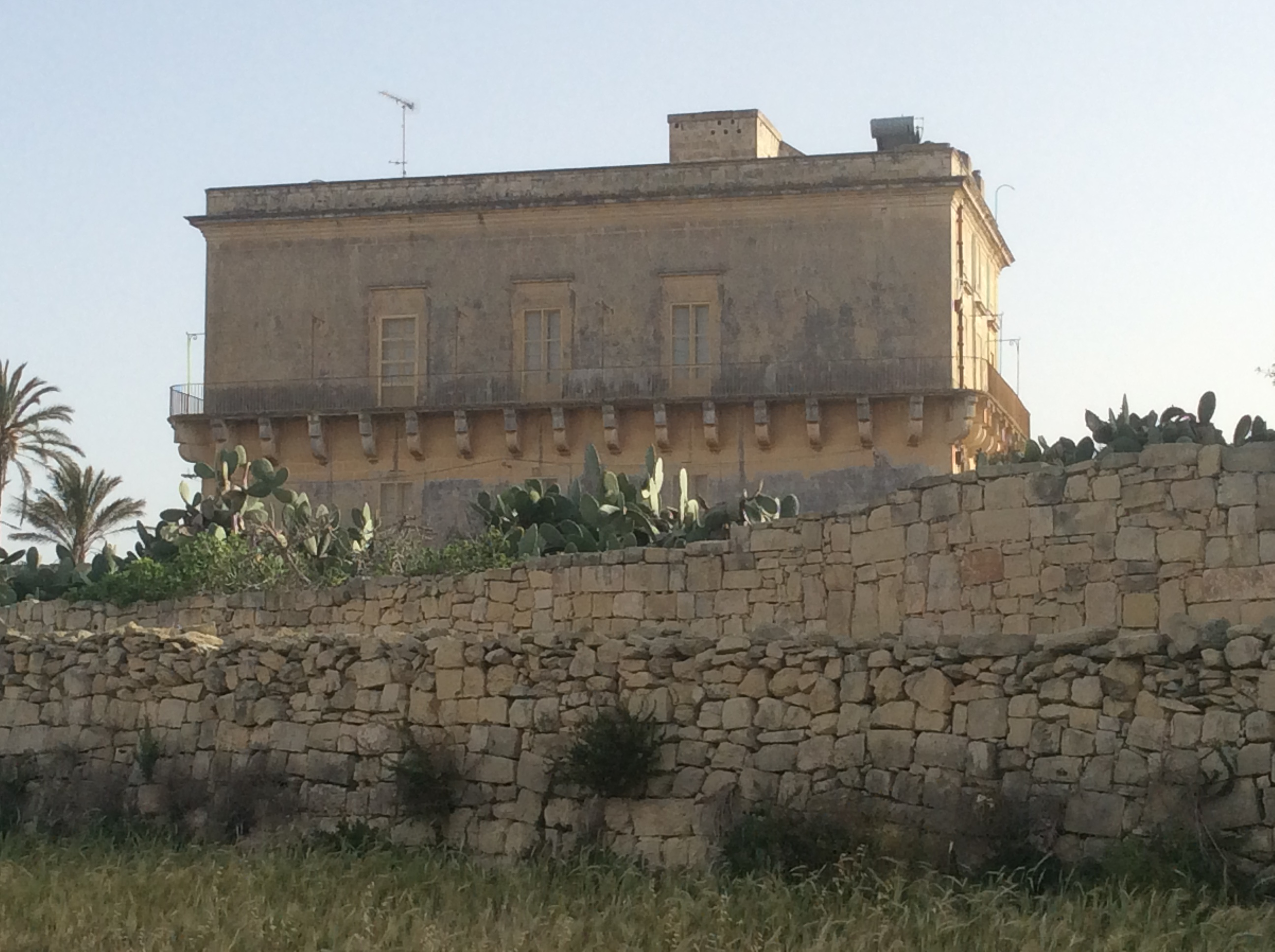
- The Cumbo Tower – which stands on a location where according to tradition a bride was kidnapped during the raid – as photographed in 2016
Date	1526
Location	Mosta, Malta, Kingdom of Sicily
Result	Pirate victory

Belligerents
Barbary pirates	Kingdom of Sicily

Commanders and leaders
Sinen/Sinan	Unknown

Strength
Several galleys Unknown number of men	Unknown

Casualties and losses
Unknown	Several killed c. 400 enslaved

The raid on Mosta was an attack by Barbary pirates on the village of Mosta, Malta, then part of the Kingdom of Sicily, in 1526. Several villagers were killed and around 400 people were captured and enslaved; according to tradition, these included a bride and some of her wedding guests. The episode came to be referenced in Maltese folklore as the tale of the bride of Mosta (Maltese: l-għarusa tal-Mosta; Italian: la sposa della Mosta).

== Background ==
During the late medieval period, the area of Mosta consisted of several hamlets including Raħal Calleja, Raħal Sir, Raħal Ħobla, Bise (Pessa) and Dimag (Dimekk) which later merged to form a single settlement. In 1419, the hamlets of Raħal Calleja, Bise and Dimag collectively had a population of 475, while by the late 15th century Mosta had a population of 482 people. Prior to the 1526 raid, Mosta was reportedly one of the most prosperous villages on Malta.

== Raid ==
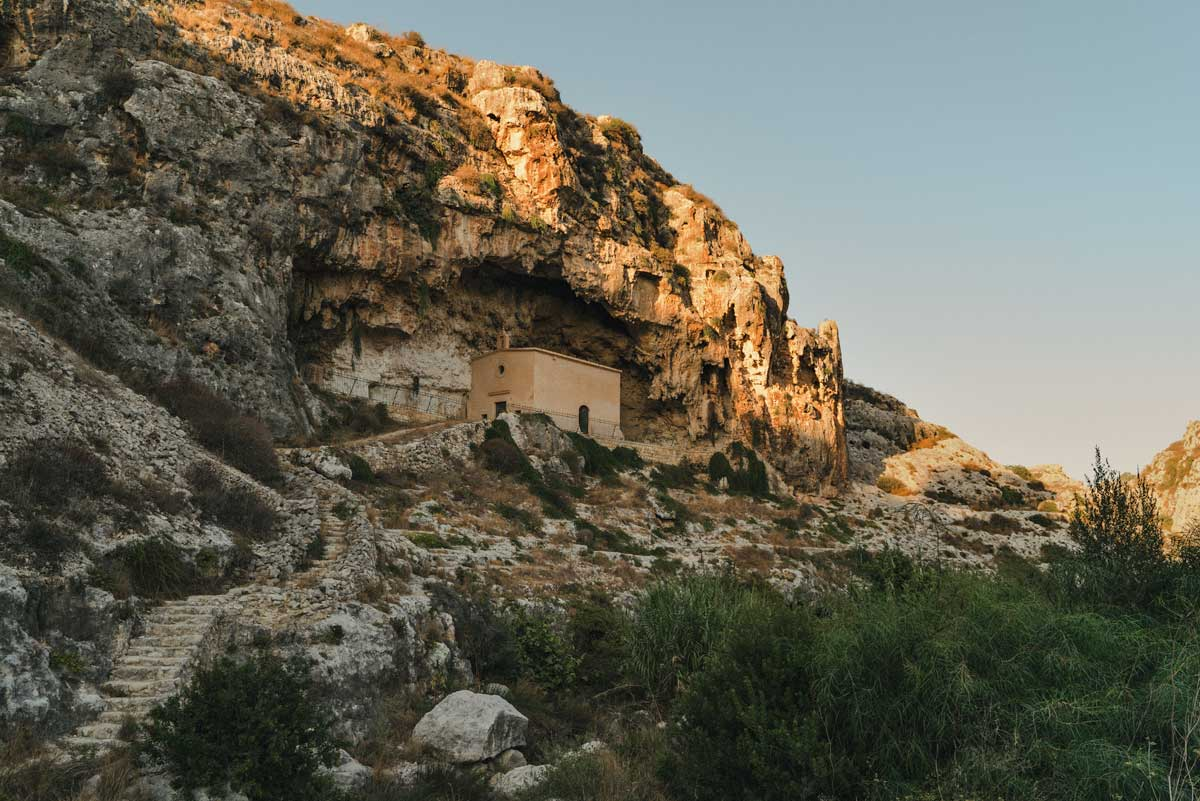
Wied il-Għasel as photographed in 2020

The raid was led by Sinen or Sinan, a corsair and rais. He landed with several galleys at Salina Bay near Burmarrad and led his men to Wied il-Għasel under the cover of night. They then launched a surprise attack, sacking and plundering the nearby village of Mosta. Several inhabitants were killed while trying to defend themselves and their families, and about 400 people were captured and enslaved. Sinen then hastily retreated as he feared a counterattack by the island's cavalry, and the attackers and their captives embarked onto Sinen's ships at St. Paul's Bay.

The attack had a lasting impact on Mosta's demographics as most of the village's population had been captured. Some villagers who survived the raid are said to have sold their possessions and property in order to ransom some of those enslaved.

== Folklore: the bride of Mosta ==
The 1526 raid is believed to have inspired the story of the bride of Mosta, a popular folk tale and ballad which describes the kidnapping of a Maltese woman by pirates either on her wedding day or a few days before. The bride was a beautiful maiden from a noble family, and in some versions of the story she is identified as 17-year-old Angelica or Marianna Cumbo, daughter of the jurat Giulio Cumbo. She was going to marry Toni Manduca, a 22-year-old son of a baron. The Cumbo family had a Turkish slave named Haggi Muley who had been infatuated with the bride, but after her engagement to Manduca, the slave had escaped and left Malta. Six months later, Haggi returned as one of Sinen's pirates, and on the night of the raid he knocked on the door of the Cumbo residence, impersonating Manduca. When the door was opened, a group of some 60 pirates entered the residence and kidnapped the bride. Some of the wedding guests were also abducted, and some versions of the story additionally state that the pirates killed some of the servants and guests or the bride's father.

The Cumbo Tower, a residence located at the outskirts of Mosta, is usually identified as the location where the abduction took place, although there is no documentary proof supporting this tradition and the building which exists today is believed to have been built at a later date. Some versions of the story suggest that the raid occurred sometime around May, while others give a date of 25 August 1525 or 1526.

On the journey towards the Barbary Coast in North Africa, the abductors are said to have dressed the bride in a turban and a giubba instead of her Maltese clothing in an attempt to compel her to convert to Islam. She was presented to a pasha and was added into his harem under the watch of a Moorish woman named Maimena. However, the bride did not give in and resign herself to a slave's life, even refusing offers to make her queen of Djerba or of all the Barbary cities. Numerous details vary from one version of the story to another: some state that she was presented to sultan Sidi Alì in Tripoli, (Note: Tripoli was not ruled by a sultan named Sidi Alì in 1526. The city had been captured by Spain in 1510 and it was still under Spanish rule when the raid on Mosta occurred. Spain controlled Tripoli until 1530, when the city was granted as a fief to the Knights Hospitaller along with Malta.) while others state that she was taken to Turkey.

There are also several versions of the bride's subsequent fate. In one version of the ballad, the bride appealed to her mother and aunt Kozza to ransom her, but they refused to spend their wealth to do so; her betrothed, however, sold a field and used the money to buy her freedom. In another version, a heartbroken Manduca learnt her location from a Jewish sorcerer in Birgu, and he went to where she was being held after disguising himself as an Arab merchant. When he was outside the sultan's palace, he sang her a ballad and the couple managed to reunite with the help of Assena, the sultan's daughter who had befriended the bride. Assena then helped them escape the palace, and they left on board a Venetian ship or a stolen boat. Although they managed to make their way back to Birgu on Malta, the bride's health declined and she died shortly afterwards, leaving Manduca heartbroken once again. He later became a sailor on a Hospitaller galley and was killed while fighting the Turks.

In at least one version, the bride was never redeemed or rescued by her betrothed, and instead she converted to Islam and became a sultana in North Africa.

== Sources and analysis ==
The raid is briefly described as a historical fact in the 1647 book Della descrittione di Malta by Giovanni Francesco Abela. The abduction of a bride and wedding guests is alluded to in a note added by Giovanni Antonio Ciantar to Abela's work, and the episode is also mentioned in an 18th-century manuscript preserved at the National Library of Malta.

Songs about the abducted bride are known to have existed in Malta during the second half of the 18th century, and the ballad is still sung as għana tal-fatt as of the early 21st century. Nicholas Zammit wrote Angelica o La Sposa della Mosta based on the folk tale and Abela's account in 1862; Ġużè Muscat Azzopardi published a revised Maltese language translation of this in 1879, in which he added and altered some details (including the bride's name being changed from Angelica to Marianna). The ballad itself was first published by Luigi Bonelli in the Archivio Glottologico Italiano in 1895, and was recorded again in Malta Cananea by Annibale Preca which was published posthumously in 1904. A version in English entitled The Maid of Malta or the Musta Maid was written by Thomas Rowley in 1913; the tale is also referenced in Notte di Dolor by Gaetano Gauci Tramblett in 1915. In 1931, a 72-stanza poem entitled L-Għarusa tal-Mosta Ġrajja ta' Malta was written by Arturo Caruana.

Ettore Rossi published a study in 1932 in which he noted some similarities between the story of the Mosta bride and a folk tale from Marsala in Sicily. During the same year, Ninu Cremona published a study in which he investigated the story's historicity and linked the folk tale to the 1526 raid recorded by Abela and Ciantar. The bride's story also bears similarities to other folk tales and ballads originating from elsewhere in Italy, including Piedmont and Calabria.

== Legacy ==
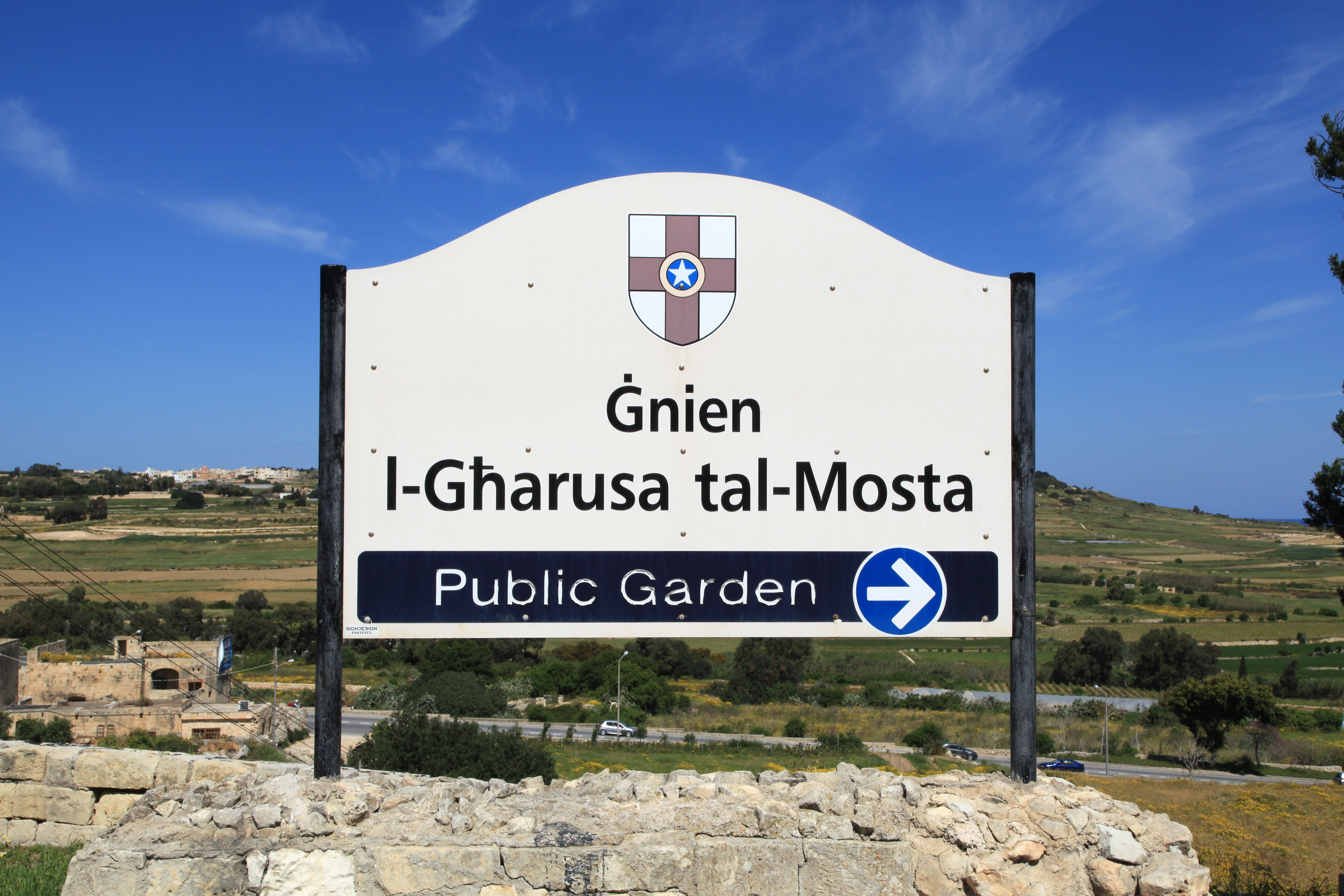
Sign at Ġnien l-Għarusa tal-Mosta as photographed in 2014

A public garden named Ġnien l-Għarusa tal-Mosta (Maltese for "Mosta Bride Garden") is located on high ground along the Victoria Lines in northwestern Mosta. This was inaugurated in 1975 and regenerated in 2019.
