= Kirkop (disambiguation) =

Kirkop is a village in the Southern Region of Malta.

Kirkop may also refer to:

- Oreste Kirkop (or Chircop) (1923–1998), Maltese singer
- Kirkop United F.C., a football club in Kirkop

== See also ==
- Chircop (disambiguation), a variant of Kirkop
