= George Mifsud Chircop =

Maltese linguist

George Mifsud Chircop (28 June 1951 in Malta – 19 December 2007 in Malta) was a Maltese linguist.

Mifsud Chircop also studied the folklore and ethnography of his native land. One of his specialties was the Maltese song genre għana. The Maltese National Book Council was quoted in the Independent as saying, “Dr Gorg Mifsud Chircop definitely served his country well and deserves the nation's praise.”

== Publications ==
- (ed.) The Ritual Year—Proceedings.
- Temprinu u Temprina 1-6
- Cosolina
- Gahan
