= Chapel of St Paul the Hermit, Wied il-Għasel =

St Paul's Chapel
- The Chapel of St Paul the hermit
- Il-Kappella ta' San Pawl l-Eremita
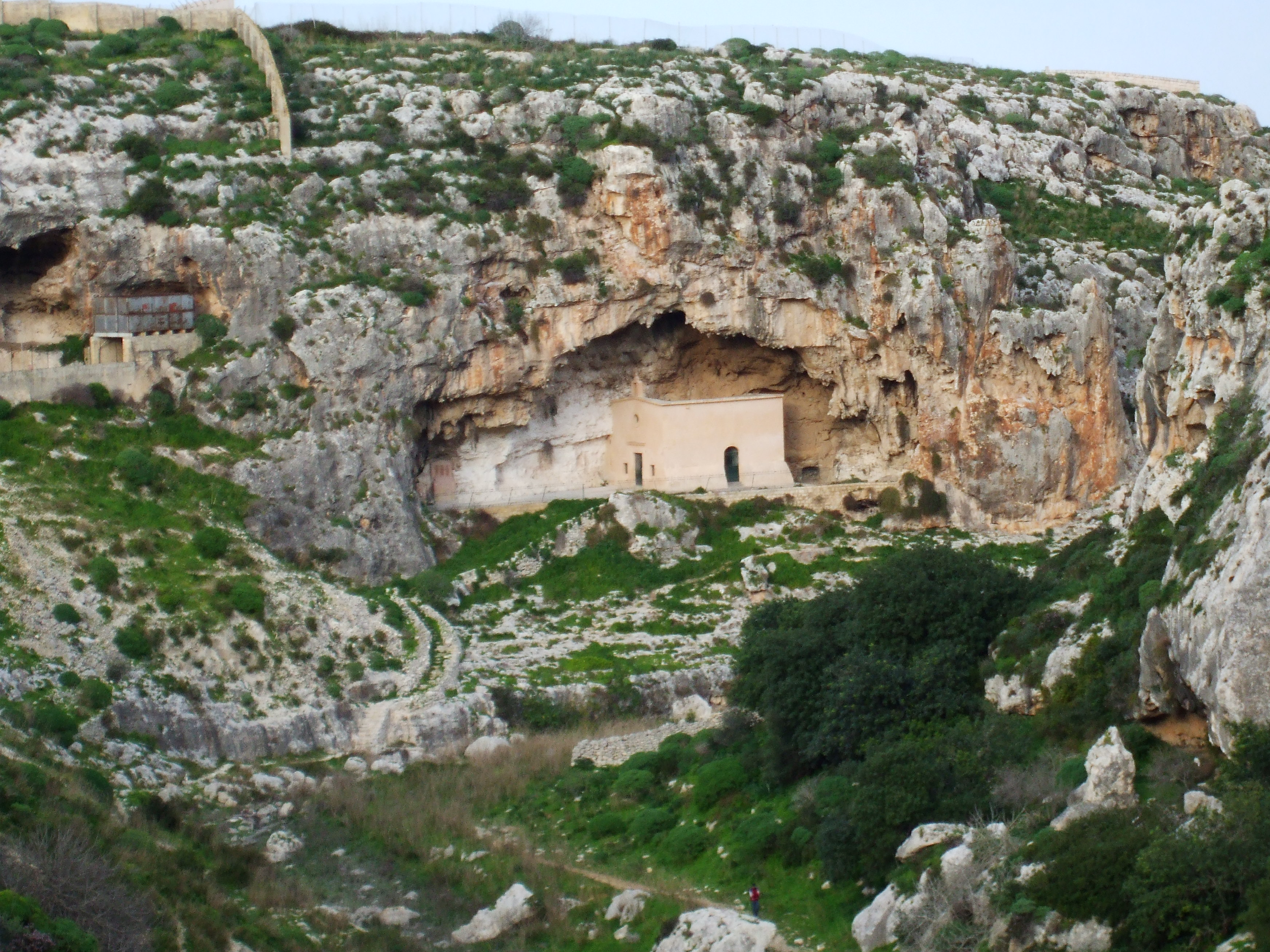
- St Paul's Chapel
- 35°55′15.6″N 14°25′43.9″E
- Location: Mosta
- Country: Malta
- Denomination: Roman Catholic

History
- Dedication: St Paul the first Hermit

Architecture
- Functional status: Church

Administration
- Archdiocese: Malta

Clergy
- Archbishop: Charles Scicluna

The Chapel of St Paul the Hermit is a small church located in a cave in Wied il-Għasel, in Mosta, Malta.

== History ==
There are legends surrounding the beginnings of this chapel. However, facts show that inquisitor Pietro Dusina visited the chapel in 1575 during his apostolic visit to Malta. He mentions that the chapel has a wooden door, something uncommon in those days, and an altar. However, there was no rector and no liturgical vestments or objects. The bishop also wrote that a certain Paolo Cumbo paid for the feast of the saint to be celebrated every year. This chapel is also mentioned in the first history book of Malta written by Giovanni Francesco Abela in 1647 describing some paintings that were in the chapel. In 1656, Ġan Pawl Mangion, a local from Mosta, brought a painting of the Virgin Mary and placed it in the cave. Bishop Balaguer of Malta gave permission for Mangion to rebuild the chapel and an altar around the painting in the cave. The chapel is also mentioned in 1676, when a certain Don Ortensio Bennini celebrated mass and preached in the chapel on its feast day.

In time, the chapel was abandoned. It was only in 1920 that Archbishop Mauro Caruana appointed Rev. Karm Gauci to care for the chapel. Consequently, the chapel was restored and a belfry built. However, due to a blockage to the road which led to the chapel, people no longer went into the valley and the chapel was once again abandoned. The chapel was also vandalised numerous times. As a result, Archbishop Mikiel Gonzi deconsecrated the chapel. However, recently, the chapel was restored back to its original state.

== Interior ==
The chapel has an altar and a painting depicting St Paul the Hermit and St Anthony of Egypt. The painting is only a copy of the original, stolen in 1988, but found some time later. Today, it can be found in the Parish church of Mosta. In a small cave accessible from the chapel, there is an altar with a painting depicting the Virgin Mary.
