= Church of Our Lady of Hope, Mosta =

Church of Our Lady of Hope
- Knisja tal-Madonna tal-Isperanza
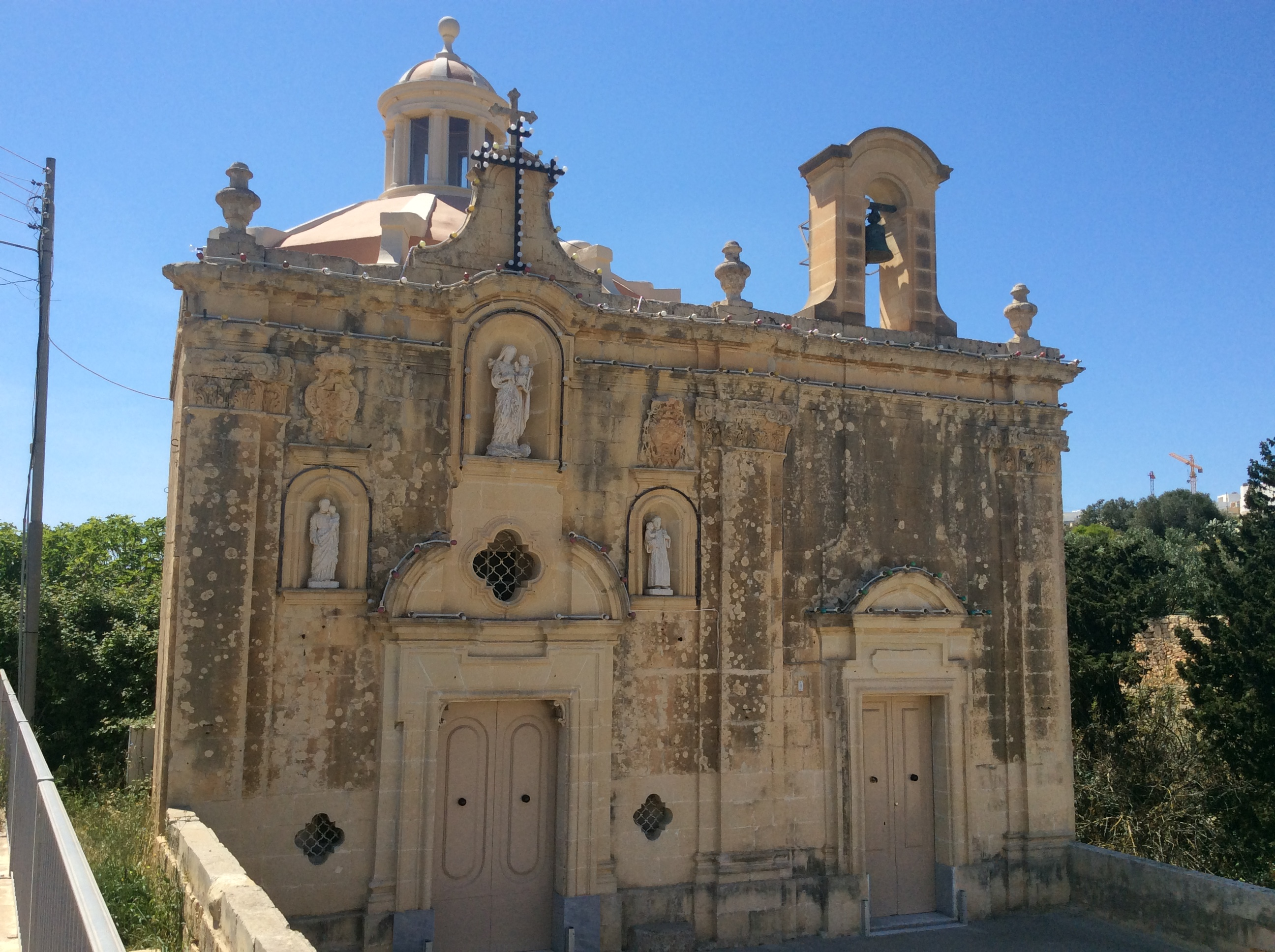
- The church as photographed in 2017
- Church of Our Lady of Hope
- 35°54′34.4″N 14°25′9.3″E
- Location: Mosta, Malta
- Denomination: Roman Catholic

History
- Status: Church
- Dedication: Our Lady of Hope

Architecture
- Functional status: Active
- Years built: 1760–1761; 1919 (lantern)

Specifications
- Materials: Limestone

Administration
- Archdiocese: Malta
- Parish: Mosta

Clergy
- Rector: Rev. Don. David Muscat

The Church of Our Lady of Hope (Maltese: Knisja tal-Madonna tal-Isperanza), also known as the Speranza Chapel, is a Roman Catholic church dedicated to the Virgin Mary located on the outskirts of Mosta, Malta. It stands over a cave overlooking the Speranza Valley (Maltese: Wied Speranza or Wied tal-Isperanza), which takes its name from the church. The building was constructed between 1760 and 1761, reportedly as an act of thanks after a woman survived a raid by Barbary pirates by hiding in the cave.

== Legend and history ==
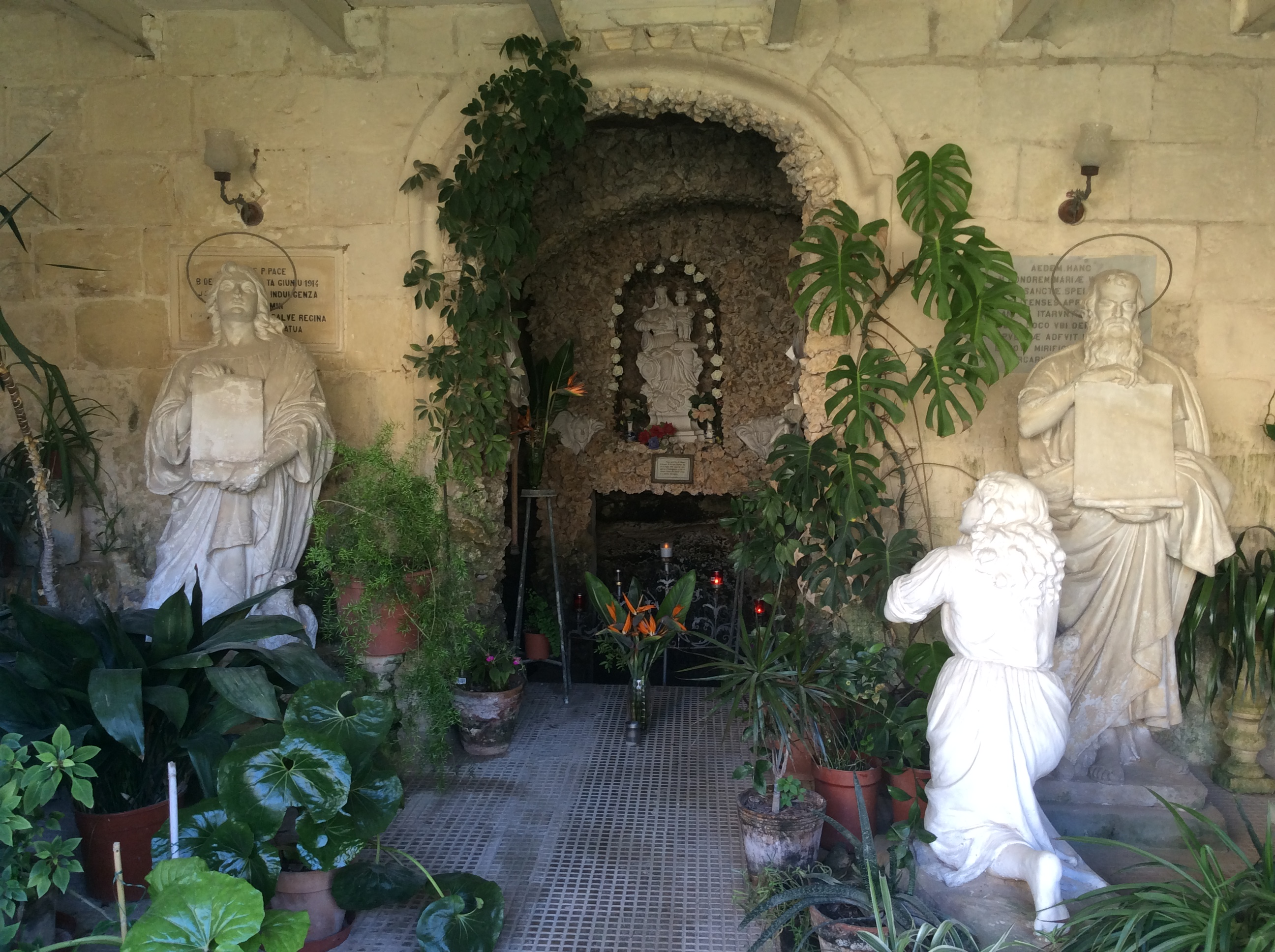
Cave below the church with the Madonna statue

The cave located beneath the church might have had religious significance prior to the 18th century, and it is sometimes identified as a consecrated cave dedicated to the Visitation of Mary which was visited by Pietro Dusina in 1575.

The church's origins can be traced to a mid-18th century legend which possibly has some historical basis. In around 1750, a family who were working their fields near Burmarrad are said to have seen a group of Barbary pirates making their way towards them, and they ran towards the relative safety of Mosta to avoid being captured. Among them was a young woman – named Marija Grazzja and aged around 20 according to some sources – who became exhausted before she could reach the town. She instead made her way to a cave within a valley, where she hid, prayed to the Virgin Mary and made a vow to build a church if she was spared from being captured and enslaved.

The pirates had seen the woman, and they searched for her within the valley but did not find her as the cave was obscured by maidenhair ferns and spider webs. A spider is said to have spun a web at the cave's entrance after the woman had entered, such that when the pirates passed directly in front of it and saw an intact web they assumed that it was impossible for the woman to be hiding inside; this came to be regarded as a miracle. After an unsuccessful search, the pirates feared a reprisal from the inhabitants of Mosta or the Mdina cavalry, and they returned to their ships empty-handed while the woman went back to her family in Mosta unharmed.

The church was eventually built over the cave in commemoration of the woman's deliverance. Funds for its construction began to be collected on 19 September 1757, and works commenced in August 1760 and were completed in 1761. The date 1760 is inscribed inside the church. The procurator responsible for the building's construction was Ġammari Galea. Over time, the church became a popular centre of devotion both among Mosta residents and among the Maltese more broadly.

The church's parvis was enlarged during the tenure of procurator Dun Ġwann Fenech in 1896. The cave beneath the church was also renovated at the initiative in 1913, and at this point a statue of the Madonna was installed inside the cave. Bishop Pietro Pace granted a 100-day indulgence to whoever prayed the Salve Regina in front of this statue on 23 June 1914. A roof lantern was added on top of the church's dome in 1919.

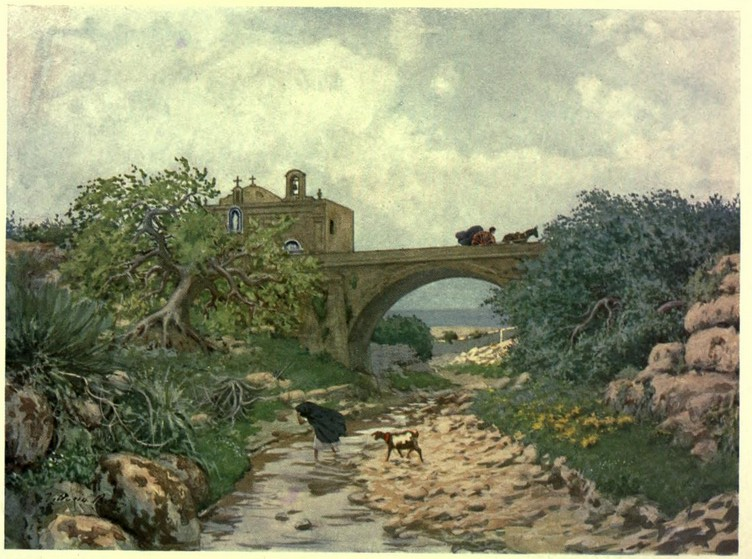
The church and nearby bridge over the Speranza valley, as painted by Vittorio Boron and published in the book Malta by Frederick W. Ryan in 1910

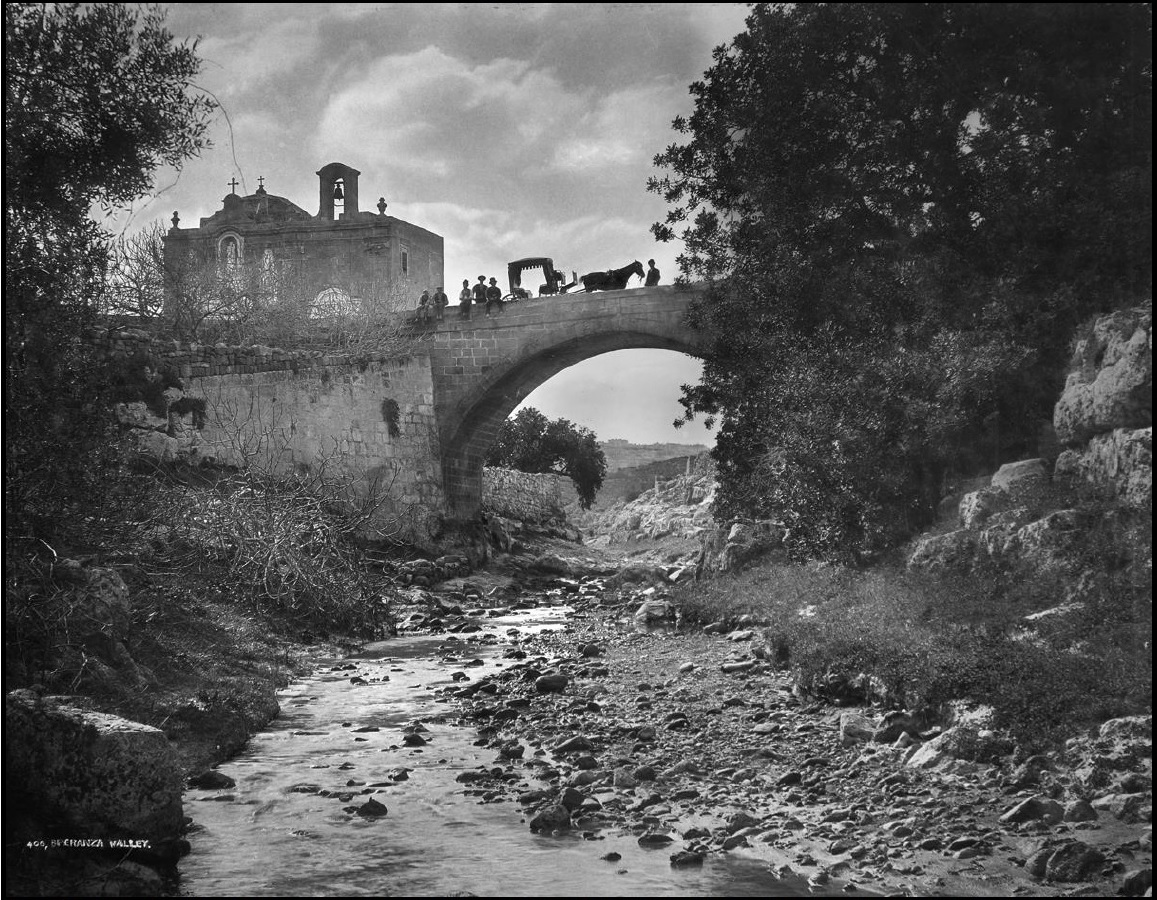
Photograph of a similar scene by Richard Ellis, taken prior to the lantern's construction in 1919

A stone arched bridge was built next to the church in 1905, and it is known as the Tal-Isperanza Bridge after the church and valley.

Bishop Emanuel Galea blessed a new altar inside the church on 3 July 1966.

The building is still in use and in good condition. Restoration works supervised by the architect Chris Grech were carried out in 2007.

== Architecture ==
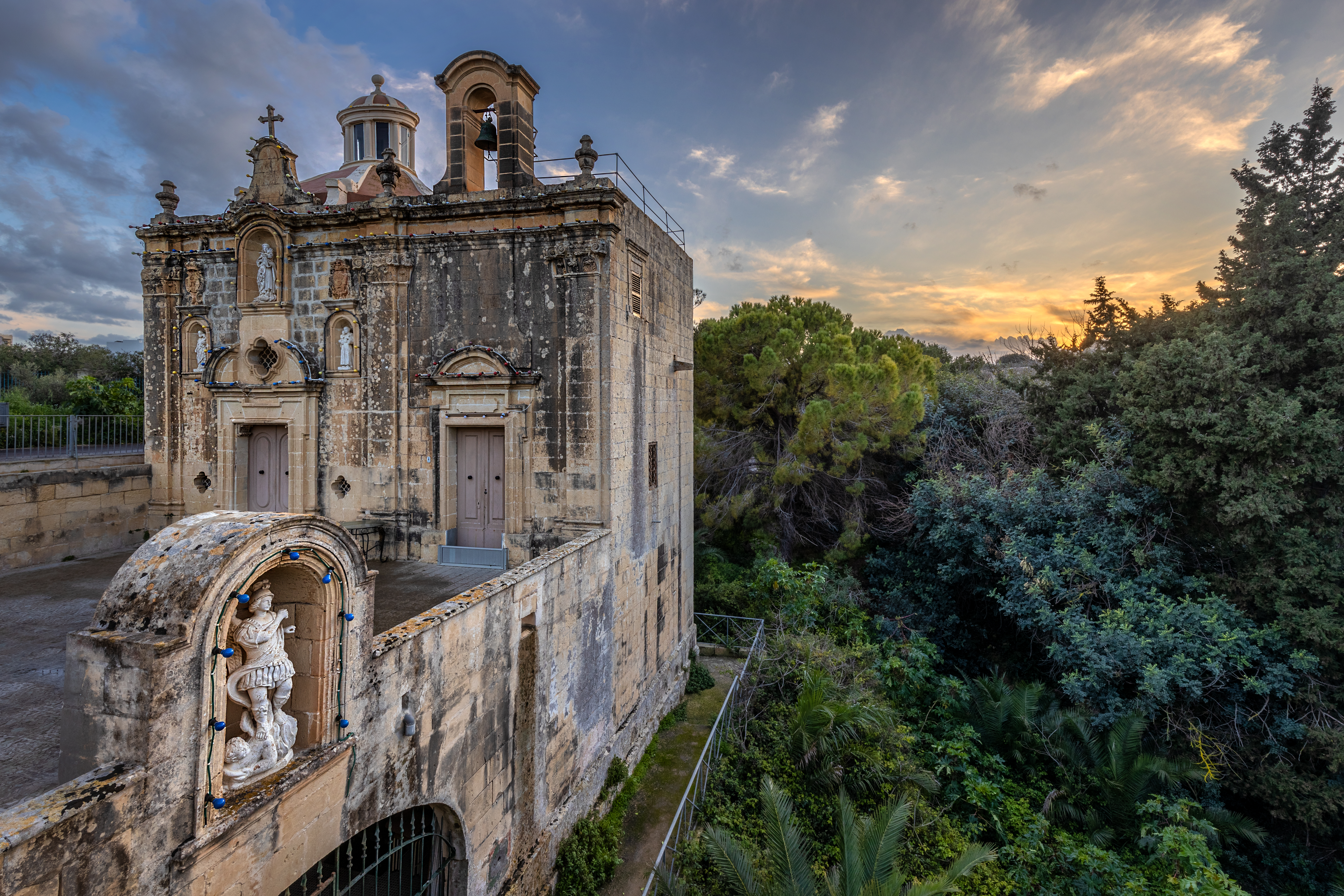
The church as photographed from the bridge in 2024, with the statue of the archangel Michael on top of the cave entrance at left

The church is believed to generally retain its original 18th-century configuration. Its façade is split into two parts by composite order pilasters, and the left part features the main portal which is topped by a broken segmented pediment, a flower-shaped window, a central niche with a statue of the Madonna and Child, and a frontispiece topped by a cross. Smaller flower-shaped windows, niches and sculpted escutcheons are located on either side of the portal. The left niche includes a statue of Saint Joseph and it is located beneath an escutcheon with the monogram "AM" (for Ave Maria) topped by a crown, while the right niche includes a statue of Saint Anthony of Padua topped by the coat of arms of Bartolomé Rull, the Bishop of Malta at the time of the church's construction. The crown above the left escutcheon suggests that it may have originally been the coat of arms of a Hospitaller Grand Master, likely Manuel Pinto da Fonseca, and that it was reworked into the monogram after the original coat of arms had deteriorated due to erosion or had been deliberately defaced, possibly during the French occupation of Malta.

The right part of the façade features a doorway with a complete segmented pediment which leads to the sacristy. A bell-cot is located at roof level, centred above the sacristy door. Internally, the church has an octagonal layout, and it includes a dome with a lantern. The side elevations feature stone water spouts.

The cave which is associated with the legend is located underneath the parvis in front of the church. A niche with a statue of the archangel Michael is located above the cave entrance, while the cave itself features statues of the Madonna and Child, Saint John the Evangelist and Saint Paul, along with a statue of a kneeling woman in reference to the legend.

== Artworks ==
The church's altarpiece is a painting of the Madonna and Child by the artist Rocco Buhagiar. The Madonna is seated on a throne of clouds and the Child Jesus is depicted holding an anchor, symbolising the church's dedication to Our Lady of Hope. The altarpiece also features a ship in distress during a storm, representing the Madonna as being a solace for sailors.

The church also includes paintings of Saint Peter and Saint Paul by Buhagiar, paintings of the Four Evangelists along the internal pilasters, statues of Saint Rita, Saint Francis Xavier and Our Lady of Lourdes, and several ex-voto paintings. In the sacristy there is a statue of Our Lady of Hope by Ġlormu Dingli and a painting of the same subject by Rafel Bonnici Cali.
