= The Maltese Bestiary =

2014 book by Stephan D. Mifsud

The Maltese Bestiary: An Illustrated Guide to the Mythical Flora and Fauna of the Maltese Islands
- First edition
- Author: Stephan D. Mifsud
- Language: English
- Genre: mythology
- Publisher: Merlin Publishers
- Publication date: 11 Nov. 2014
- Pages: 144

The Maltese Bestiary: An illustrated guide to the mythical flora and fauna of the Maltese Islands is a 2014 compendium of legendary beasts from Maltese folklore. It showcases "supernatural entities, frightening creatures, magical plants, ancient gods and a host of other legendary beings" all from the islands of Malta and Gozo. Stephan D. Mifsud is both the author and the illustrator of the book.

== Background ==
Mifsud is a biologist with a long-time interest in fantasy creatures. In 2011, he began work on The Maltese Bestiary because he felt that Malta was lacking of a concise folklore encyclopedia. He chose to publish the book in English instead of Maltese to reach a wider audience as he believed that non-Maltese people and non-Maltese speakers would still have an interest in Maltese folklore. He also hoped to reach a wider audience to help Maltese folklore become more widely known. Much of his research was done by speaking to older relatives and by reading older books. Mifsud has cited Fr. Emanuel Magri as being a major source of his research.

== Awards ==
The book won the National Book Council's National Book Prize (Maltese: Premju Nazzjonali Tal-Ktieb) for Best Book Production in 2015.
