= Cumbo Tower =

- Torri Cumbo
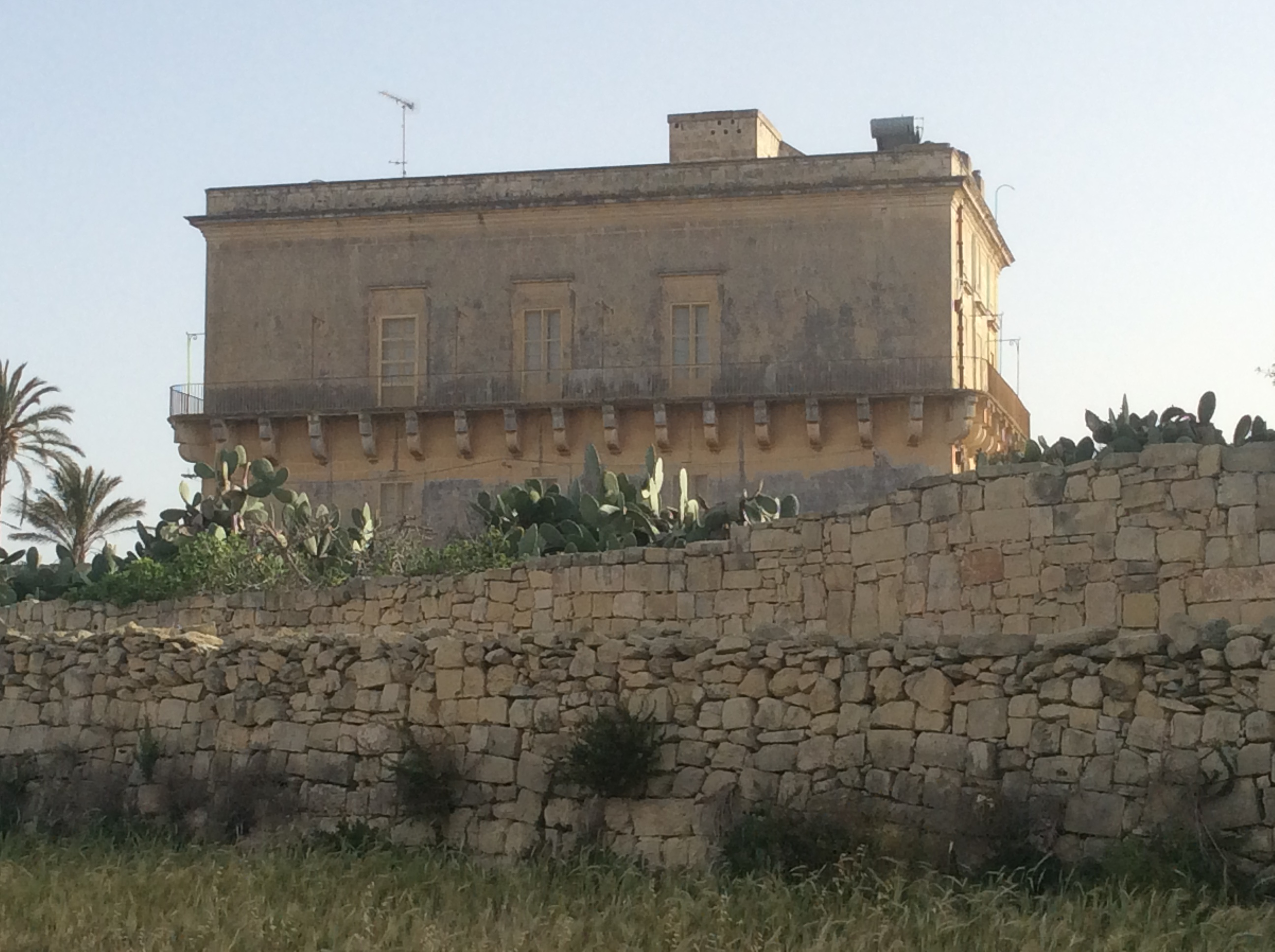
- Northeast façade as photographed in 2016
- Interactive map of the Cumbo Tower area

General information
- Status: Intact
- Type: Residence
- Location: Mosta, Malta
- Coordinates: 35°54′07.6″N 14°25′25.5″E
- Completed: c. 19th century
- Owner: Baron Lino Testaferrata Bonici and Baroness Maria Testaferrata Bonici (née Testaferrata Moroni Viani)

Technical details
- Material: Limestone

The Cumbo Tower (Maltese: Torri Cumbo) is a historic residential building located in Mosta, Malta. Its site is traditionally associated with the legend of the bride of Mosta (Maltese: l-għarusa tal-Mosta), which is possibly based on a 1526 raid. The present building was constructed in around the 19th century.

== History and folklore ==
An early Christian family tomb dating back to the Roman or Byzantine era is located on the grounds of the Cumbo Tower.

The property was built by and is named after the Cumbo family, a prominent family in late medieval and early modern Malta which included a number of judges. The property is believed to have belonged to Giulio Cumbo, a lawyer who was a jurat in the Università of Mdina in 1525. According to tradition, Cumbo's daughter was abducted from the tower by Barbary pirates shortly before or during her wedding. The bride's story became a folk tale and the subject of a ballad, and although there is no solid evidence of her abduction, there are records that a raid on Mosta occurred in 1526 during which some 400 people were captured and enslaved.

The present building was constructed in around the 19th century. The building served as an officers' mess during World War II.

Nowadays, the tower hosts a reservoir belonging to Malta's Water Services Corporation which receives water from Chadwick Lakes through an underground channel.

The tower was scheduled as a grade 2 national monument by the Malta Environment and Planning Authority in 2012.

== Architecture ==
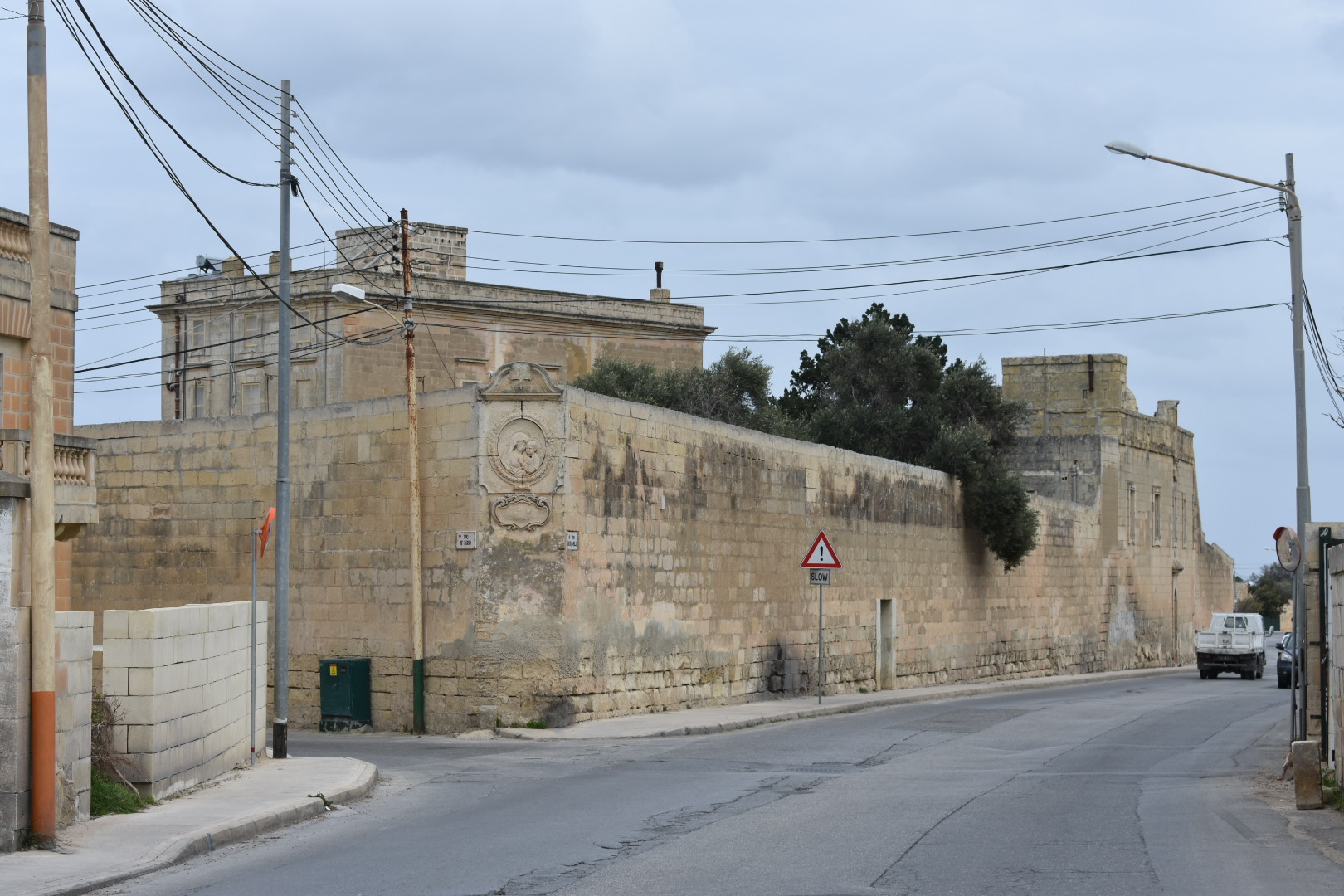
Cumbo Tower as viewed from Triq Durumblat, photographed in 2017

The building has three floors, and it forms part of a large plot of land including a garden. A niche is located along the main façade, and the property also includes another arched entrance which leads to the gardens. The grounds include servants' quarters and a coach house.

== In popular culture ==
- The tower is visible in the 2016 film 13 Hours: The Secret Soldiers of Benghazi.
