= Chircop =

Chircop may refer to:

- Kirkop, also known as Chircop, a village in the Southern Region of Malta

== People with the surname ==
- Francesca Chircop (born 1993), Maltese footballer
- George Mifsud Chircop (1951–2007), Maltese linguist
- Karl Chircop (1965–2008), Maltese doctor and politician
- Lynn Chircop (born 1980), Maltese singer and television presenter
- Silvan Chircop (Born 1999), Maltese Physiotherapist

== See also ==
- Oreste Kirkop (also known as Oreste Chircop) (1923-1998), Maltese singer
