= Wied il-Għasel =

Valley in Mosta, Malta

Coordinates: 35.918461°N 14.427141°E

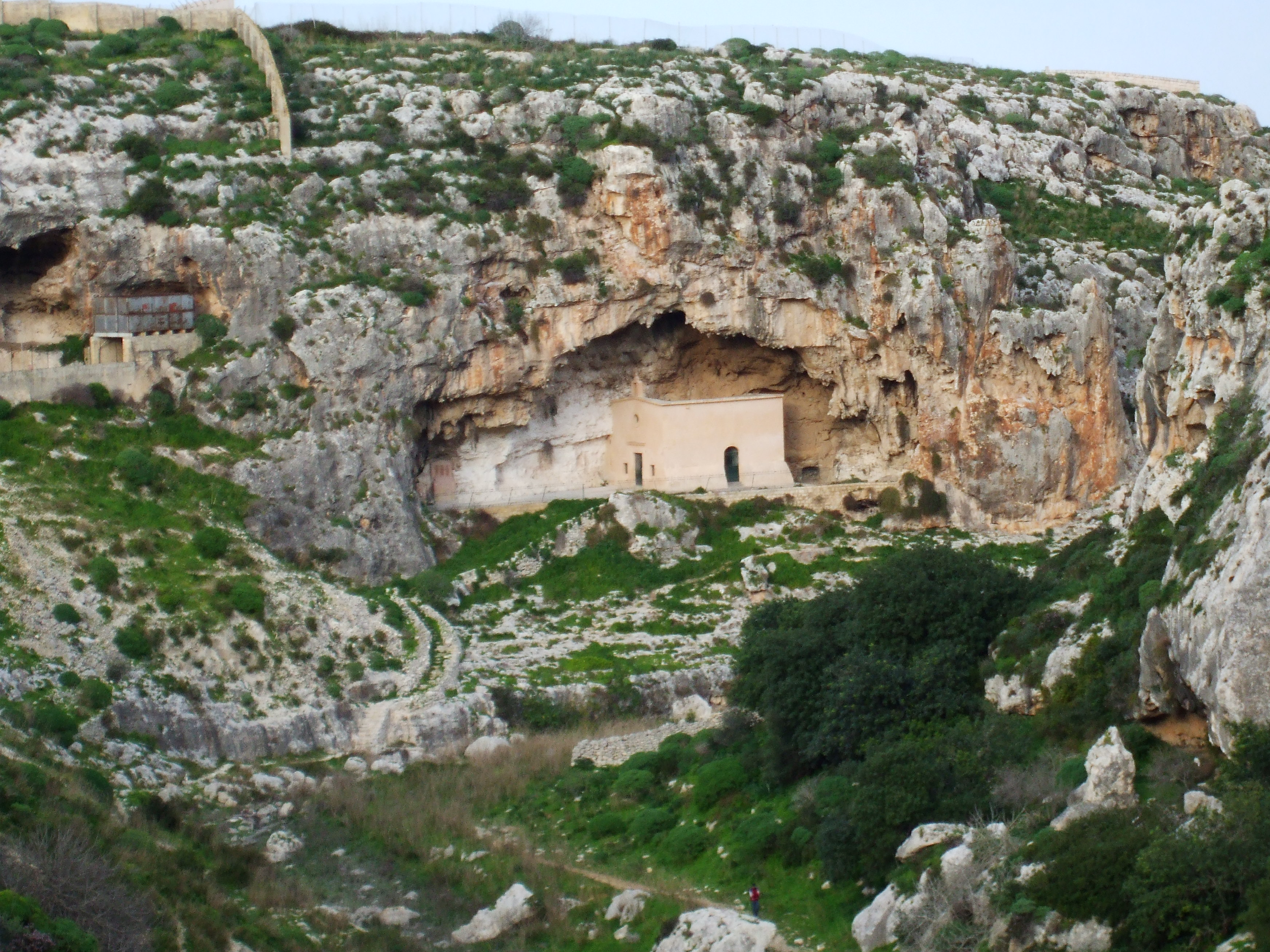
The Chapel of St. Paul the Hermit, which is located in a cave in Wied il-Għasel

Wied il-Għasel (English: Honey Valley) is a valley in Mosta, in the Northern Region of Malta. Several caves are located within the valley, one of which is occupied by the small Chapel of St. Paul the Hermit. The Victoria lines also go through the valley. Multiple walking paths and vistas are also accessible.
