= Mosta =

Mosta Il-Mosta Musta
- Local council
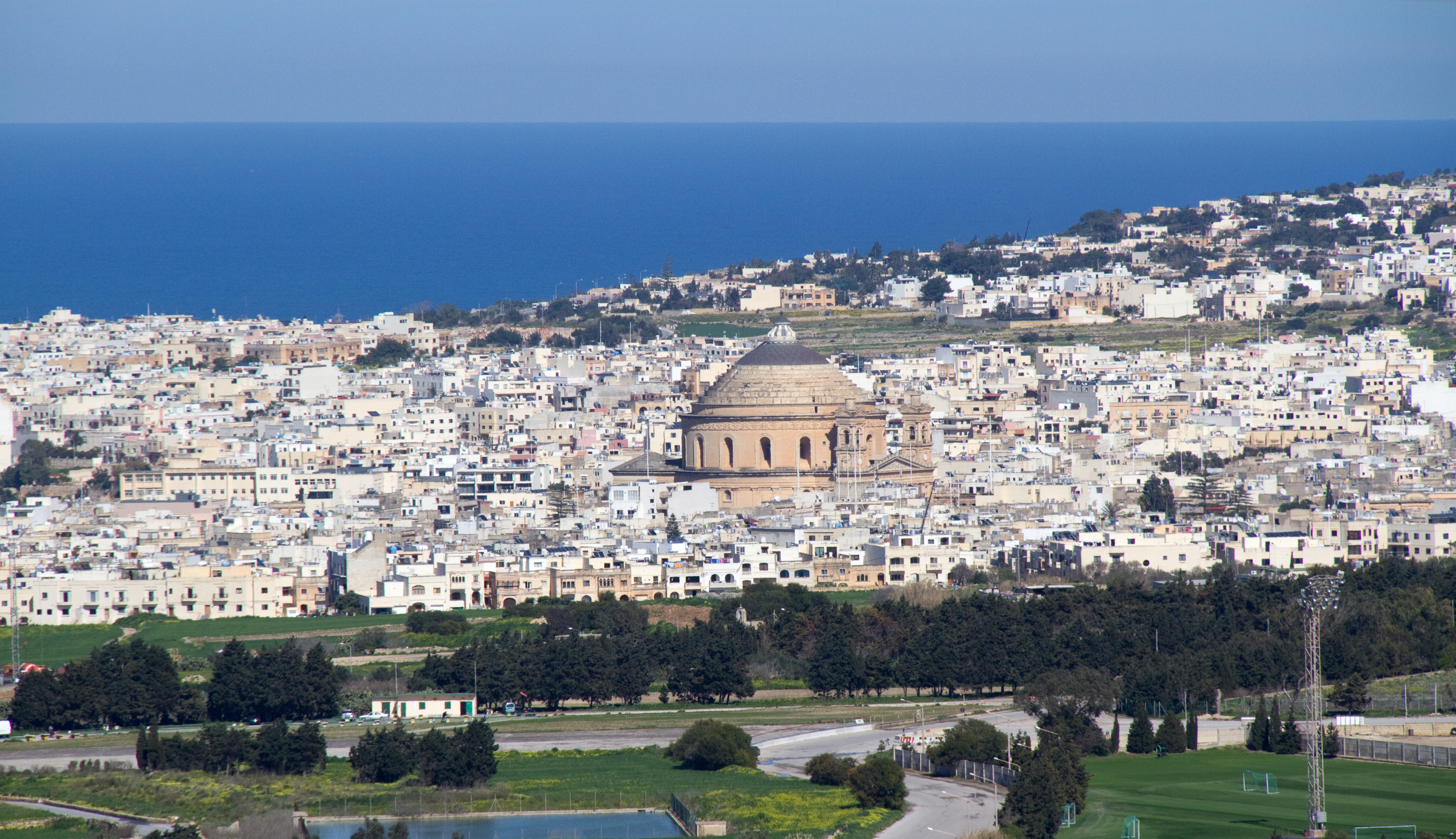
- View of Mosta with the Rotunda in the centre, photographed from Mdina in 2012

- Flag Coat of arms
- Motto: Spes Alit Ruricolam
- Coordinates: 35°54′35″N 14°25′34″E
- Country: Malta
- Region: Northern Region
- District: Northern District
- Borders: Attard, Lija, Mġarr, Naxxar, Rabat, St. Paul's Bay

Government
  - Type: Mayor and cabinet within a directly-elected council
  - Body: Mosta Local Council
  - Mayor: Joseph Gatt (PN)

Area
  - Total: 6.8 km^{2} (2.6 sq mi)

Population (Jul 2024)
  - Total: 25,379
  - Density: 3,700/km^{2} (9,700/sq mi)
- Demonyms: Mosti (m), Mostija (f), Mostin (pl)
- Time zone: UTC+1 (CET)
  - Summer (DST): UTC+2 (CEST)
- Postal code: MST
- Dialing code: 356
- ISO 3166 code: MT-32
- Zones: Beżbiżija, Blata l-Għolja, Folju, il-Ħanqa, Mosta Technopark, Mount Saint Joseph, San Ġużepp tat-Tarġa, San Pawl Eremita, San Pawl tal-Qlejgħa, San Silvestru, Santa Margerita, (Sgħajtar), L-Isperanza, Ta' Bistra, Ta' Maċedonja, Ta' Mlit, Ta' Redusa, Ta' Srajgu, Ta' Xkora, Tal-Awrora, Taċ-Ċawla, Tad-Daqqaq, Tad-Dib, Tal-Ħanżira, Tal-Qares, Tal-Wata, Tal-Wej, Tas-Sriedek, Tat-Torba, Taż-Żokrija, Tarġa Gap, Wied Ġjananu, Wied il-Għasel.
- Patron saint: Assumption of Mary
- Day of festa: 15 August
- Website: Official website

Mosta (Maltese: Il-Mosta) is a small but densely populated city in the Northern Region of Malta. The most prominent building in Mosta is the Rotunda, a large basilica built by its parishioners' volunteer labour. It features the world's third largest unsupported dome, and displays a replica of a German bombshell that famously crashed through the dome during World War II but did not detonate upon impact.

The Mosta parish celebrates the feast of the Assumption of Mary every 15 August. Mosta's feast day celebration is popular amongst both locals and tourists. The city is annually decorated by local parishioners and townspeople, seeking to demonstrate their affection for the city and its patron saint, weeks ahead of the public procession.

The population of Mosta was 25,379 in July 2024. This included 13,008 males and 12,371 females; 20,965 Maltese nationals and 4,414 foreign nationals.

== General ==
=== History ===
Mosta has been inhabited since prehistory. Dolmens in the limits of Mosta and cart ruts are primary evidence of this. Each dolmen has two rectangular standing stones and one other similar stone positioned horizontally above the other two.

In the Middle Ages, Mosta was a small hamlet amongst a number of other hamlets, each sparsely populated. These tiny villages were Raħal Calleja, Raħal Ħobla, Raħal Pessa (or Pise / Bise), Raħal Sir, Raħal Kircipulli, Raħal Brabar and Raħal Dimech (or Dimag). In the 16th century, these hamlets decreased in importance and Mosta took its place as the principal village. In 1419, the hamlets of Raħal Calleja, Bise and Dimag collectively had a population of 475, while by the late 15th century Mosta had a population of 482 people.

In 1526, Barbary pirates led by Sinen Rais raided Mosta, killed some of its inhabitants and enslaved around 400 people. According to tradition, a bride who was about to get married was among those captured, and this episode came to be known as the tale of the bride of Mosta (Maltese: l-għarusa tal-Mosta) in Maltese folklore. Several versions of the story exist, with the most common being that a bride named Angelica or Marianna Cumbo was abducted from her family's residence, the Cumbo Tower, and was taken to the harem of a North African sultan or pasha. In most versions, her betrothed, Toni Manduca, managed to obtain her freedom by paying a ransom or by traveling to where she was being held and helping her escape. The bride is said to have died shortly after their return to Malta and her husband died some time later while fighting the Turks.

The apostolic visit of Mgr Pietro Dusina in 1575 indicated that even the church dedicated to the Assumption that stood in Mosta was so important in the area that it was erroneously called ‘parochial church’. In 1575, there were 580 persons living in Mosta.

Mosta is, in contemporary times, witnessing the construction of many new houses. New built-up zones with residential houses are found on the outskirts of older Mosta. These new zones are known as: Santa Margerita, Tal-Blata l-Għolja, Iż-Żokrija, Is-Sgħajtar and Ta' Mlit. This means that the population of Mosta is increasing. Mosta has also become a bustling commercial centre. All these developments have made Mosta a big town by local standards and it is today amongst the largest in the Maltese Islands.

=== Transportation ===
As Mosta is at the centre of Malta; buses pass through Mosta on the way to Buġibba, Burmarrad, St. Paul's Bay, Qawra, Xemxija, Mġarr, Ċirkewwa and Mellieħa.

=== Social Groups ===
Mosta has its own scouts and girl guides, two band clubs (Nicolo' Isouard and Santa Marija), and two fireworks factories (Santa Marija and 15 ta' Awwissu). A lot of traffic passes through Constitution Street, one of Mosta's main streets, connecting the south to the north.

== Places of interest ==
=== Sanctuary Basilica of the Assumption of Our Lady ===
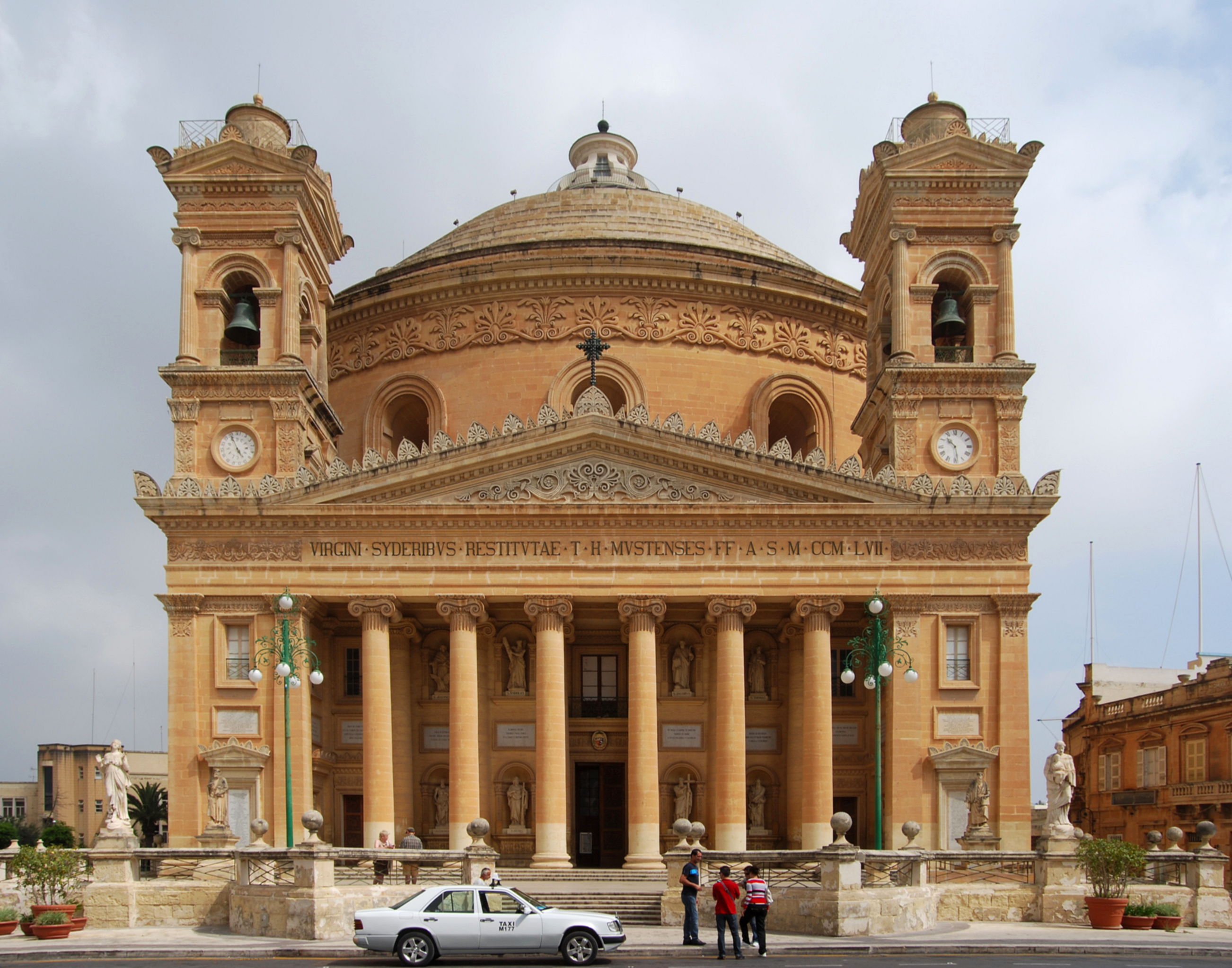
Mosta Dome as photographed in 2009

The parish church of Mosta is said to have the third largest unsupported dome in the world. The church, also commonly known as the Rotunda of Mosta or the Mosta Dome, is dedicated to the assumption of Mary. The Feast of the Assumption is held on 15 August and it is a public holiday in Malta.

From its inception as a parish in 1608, Mosta has had three different churches built on the same site, with the current one being designed by Giorgio Grognet de Vassé, a French resident of Mosta. The Mostin at that time, totalling not more than 1500, built the church.

Grognet’s design was based on that of the Pantheon of Rome. Due to debates and doubts regarding the design, the first stone was laid on 30 May 1833. The rotunda has a diameter of 55.20 metres on the outside and 39.60 metres on the inside. The main façade faces south and has six columns in the Ionic style. On each side, a steeple rises from the façade. Following the front elevation, the church has an analogous style at the back, but without steeples. The dome was built on the principle of the catenary profile, meaning that each stone was laid over the one underneath it.

The church took 27 years to complete and became a major attraction. On 9 April 1942, the church was nearly destroyed during World War II. An Axis bomb hit the dome of the church whilst people were inside, but it failed to explode. The detonator was removed and a replica bomb is now displayed as a memorial.

=== Lion monument in Rotunda Square ===
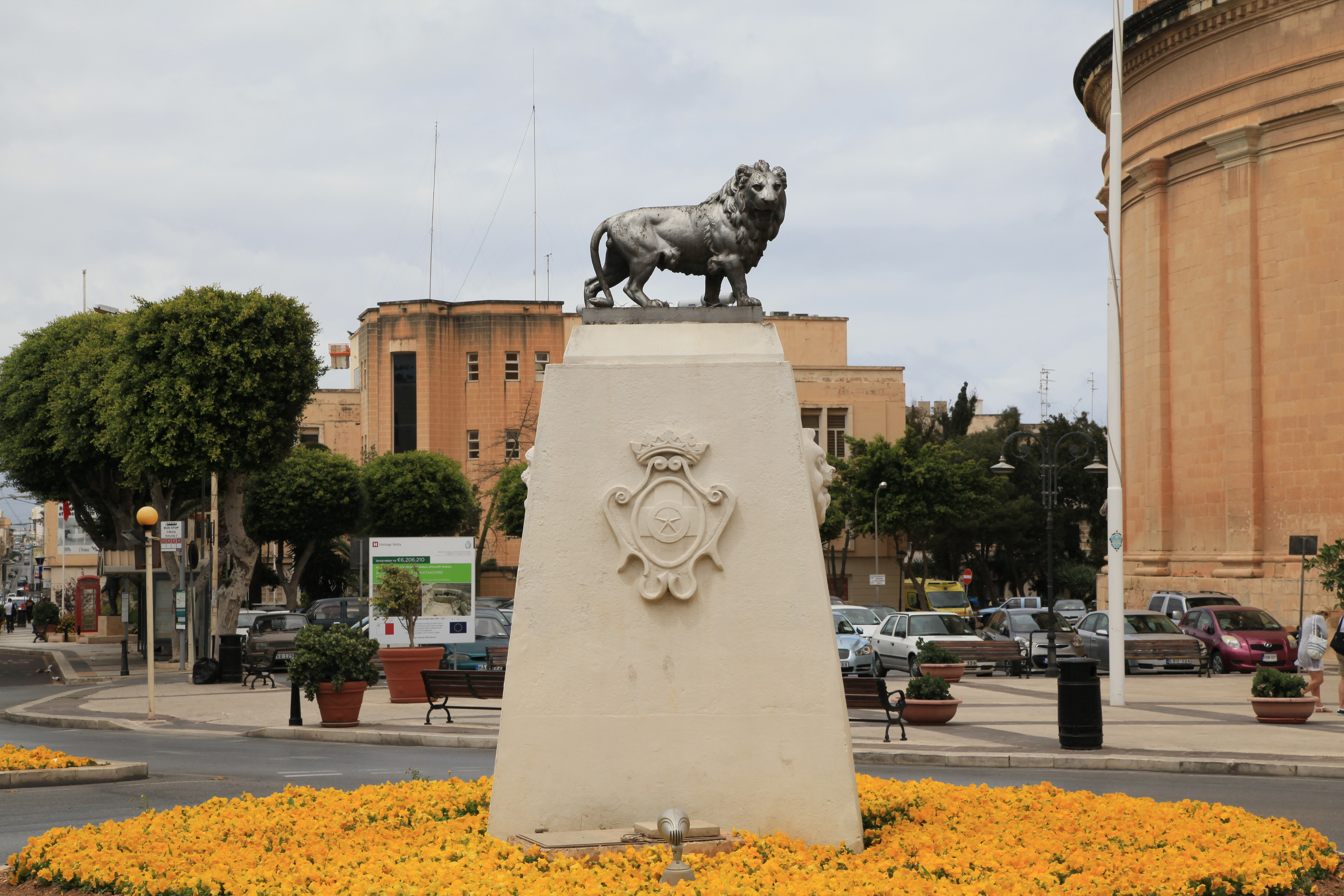
Lion monument as photographed in 2014

A prominent feature of Rotunda Square is a statue of a lion on a pedestal, which was removed in 2023 and placed in the public garden behind the church. Once, this was part of a fountain which originally was in Sliema. The fountain has since been removed. The statue is made of bronze-coloured cast iron. It was made in the Val d'Osne Foundry in Paris. Embossed on the pedestal there are the coat-of-arms of Mosta and those of independent Malta.

=== Ta' Bistra Catacombs ===
The Ta' Bistra Catacombs are Malta's largest set of catacombs found to date outside Rabat, and are located in Triq il-Missjunarji Maltin in Mosta. The site was first recorded in the late 19th century and the catacombs were first investigated in 1933 by Captain Charles Zammit, before they were partially covered over by a new road leading to Burmarrad. Further studies were carried out in 2004, 2013 and 2014, and the site has been the subject of three EU-funded projects. It is now managed by Heritage Malta and is open to the public.

=== Speranza Chapel (Chapel of Our Lady of Hope) ===
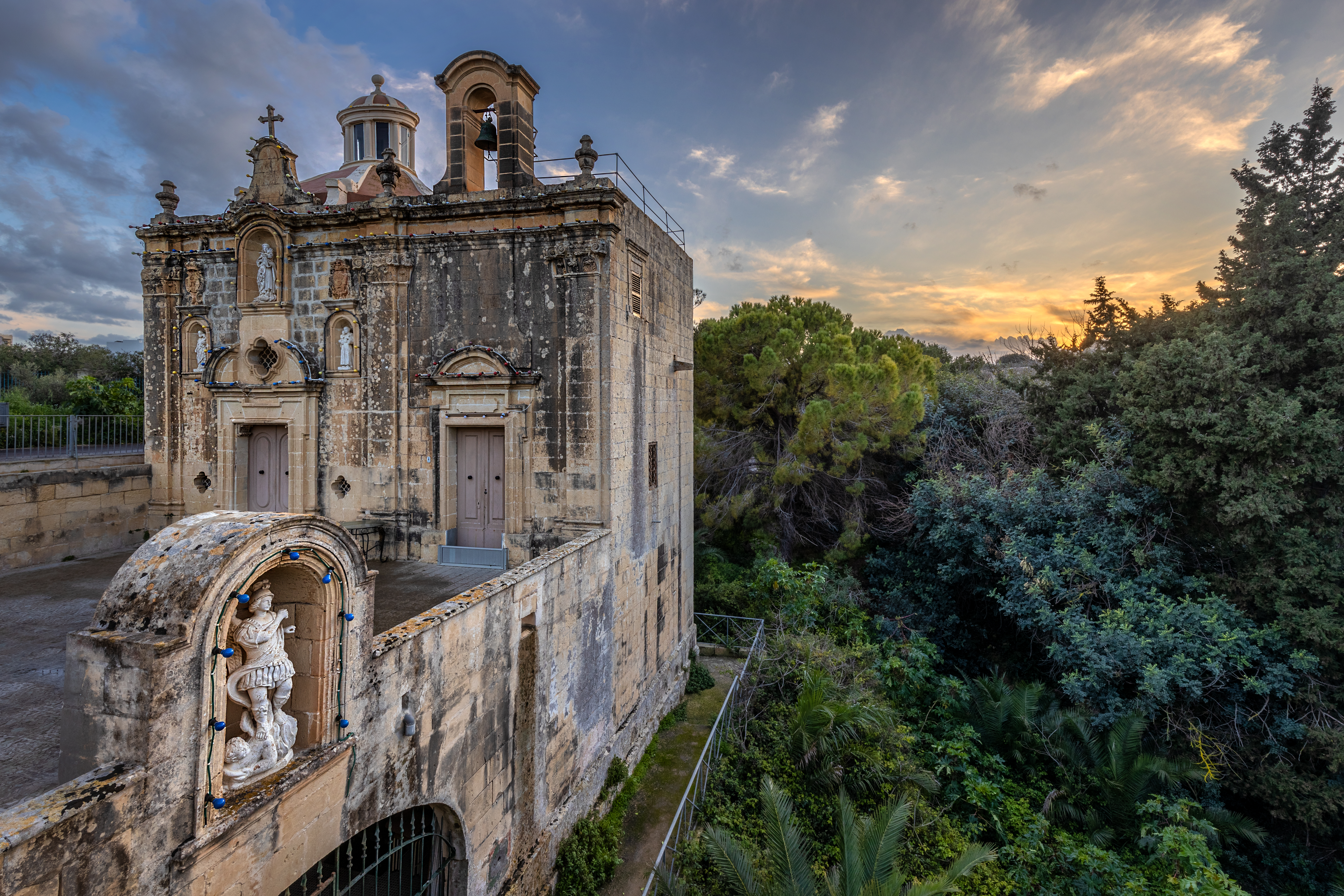
Speranza Chapel as photographed in 2024

An attraction in Mosta is the Speranza Chapel in the Speranza Valley. The chapel was built between 1760 and 1761. A legend tied to the Chapel recounts that, during a Turkish invasion, a young girl and her sisters taking care of their family's sheep were at risk to be taken by the invaders. Whilst the sisters escaped, the young girl could not run fast enough because she limped slightly. It is said that she hid in a cave found under the chapel's left side. Meanwhile, she prayed to Mary, promising that if she were saved, she would build a chapel dedicated to Our Lady. When the Turkish invaders chasing her arrived, they did not look for her in the cave because they thought the girl could not be hiding there as there was an intact spider web at the entrance, which would have been damaged had she entered the cave.

=== Marquis Mallia Tabone Farmhouse ===
The Marquis Mallia Tabone Farmhouse is a folklore attraction run by the Talent Mosti philanthropy in collaboration with the adjacent school's council. The farmhouse overlooks the valley of Wied il-Għasel. It houses exhibitions varying from paintings, photography, artisan work, hobbies and a permanent folklore museum.

=== Wied Filep Dolmens ===
Two dolmens, dating back to the Bronze Age, can be seen in a field between Vjal Ragusa and Dawret il-Wied.

=== Cumbo Tower ===
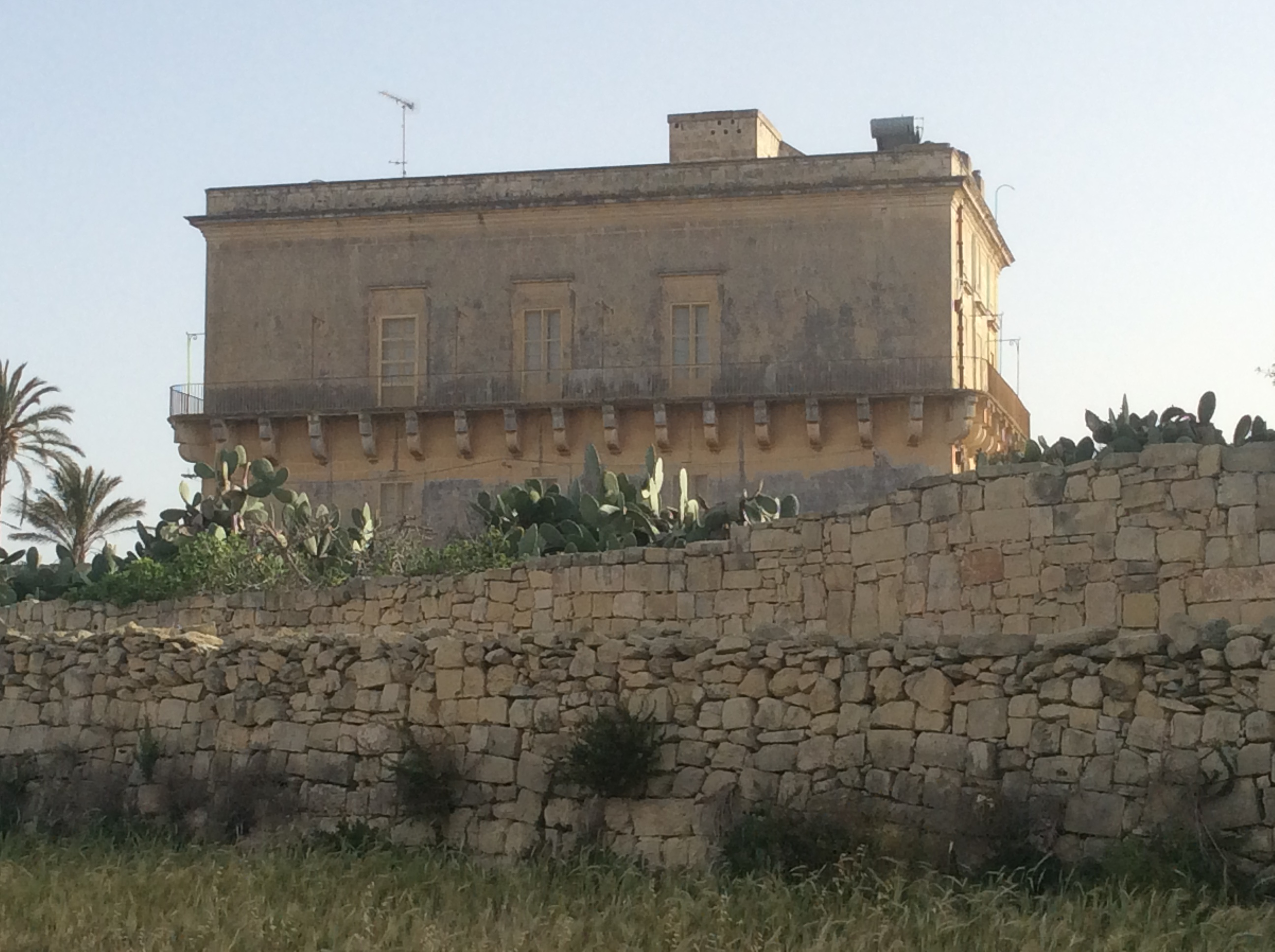
Cumbo Tower as photographed in 2016

The Cumbo Tower is a historic residence in Mosta. In the grounds there is a small Christian family tomb from the Roman era.

== Other sites of interest ==
=== Tal-Għammariet Hypogeum ===
This is a site that has most likely been destroyed, and has been recorded by Emmanuel Magri as being in the hamlet of Ħal Dimech, now part of Mosta, and not far from the Ta' Bistra Catacombs.

=== Fort Mosta Catacomb ===
Within the grounds of Fort Mosta, there is a small catacomb. Originally, this was a Punic shaft tomb but it was enlarged into a Roman period catacomb complete with an agape table. This site is within the confines of Fort Mosta which is used by the Armed Forces of Malta.

=== Wied il-Għasel Catacomb ===
Another small catacomb is found in Wied il-Għasel, consisting of a series of seven tombs dug in the rock in a semi-circular form found in the side of a natural cave beneath Fort Mosta.

=== Alleged Roman Temple site ===
In a 2008 publication, then Mosta Mayor Dr Paul Chetcuti Caruana stated: "As many know, and no one knows, in the neighbourhood of Ta’ Bistra there is at least one Roman temple which has been buried by the speculators."

== Zones in Mosta ==
- Beżbiżija
- Blata l-Għolja
- Folju
- il-Ħanqa
- Mosta Technopark
- Mount Saint Joseph
- San Ġużepp tat-Tarġa
- San Pawl Eremita
- San Pawl tal-Qlejgħa
- San Silvestru
- Santa Margerita
- Sgħajtar
- L-Isperanza
- Ta' Bistra
- Ta' Maċedonja
- Ta' Mlit
- Ta' Redusa
- Ta' Srajgu
- Ta' Xkora
- Tal-Awrora
- Taċ-Ċawla
- Tad-Daqqaq
- Tad-Dib
- Tal-Ħanżira
- Tal-Qares
- Tal-Wata
- Tal-Wej
- Tas-Sriedek
- Tat-Torba
- Taż-Żokrija
- Tarġa Gap
- Wied Ġjananu
- Wied il-Għasel

== Education ==
Quality Schools International operates QSI Malta, an international school, in Mosta.

== Twin cities ==
Mosta has three sister cities:

- Millbrae, California, United States (since April 1996)
- Ragusa, Italy
- Cassagnabère-Tournas, France
