= Għana (folk music) =

Traditional folk music from Malta

Għana (/ˈɑːnə/ AH-nə) is a type of traditional folk music from Malta. Għana has two literal meanings. The first is richness, wealth and prosperity; the second is associated with singing, verse, rhyme and even kantaliena, a type of singing with a slow rhythm. Għana can be broken up into formal and informal practices. The origin of the word is Arabic Ghena or Ghina غنى/غناء which means the same : richness or singing/songs/lyrics, etc.

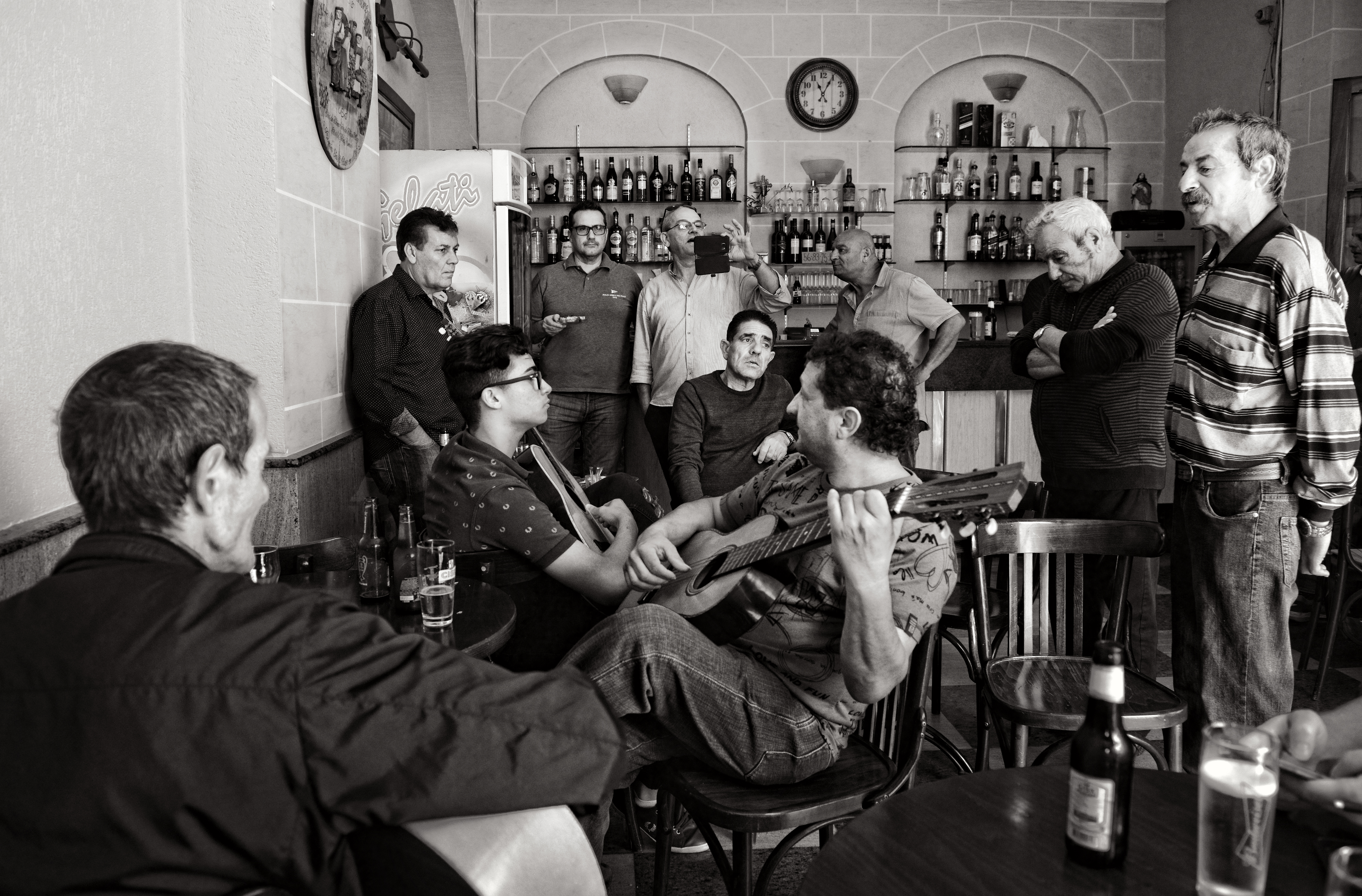
Għanneja (singers) and musicians playing together at a bar in Zurrieq

A singer in this field is locally called għannej (literally 'the singer'). All għana singing consists of "a tight voice type" with "straining of throat muscles and controlled use of diaphragm muscles to produce a loud sound".

Maltese music has been said to reflect influence from the country's history of successive occupations under different colonial powers, including Maghrebi Arabs, and Aragonese. Għana has been called "a synthesis of North African and European music." The improvised singing duels of the spirtu pront style of għana have been compared to the exchanges of poetry found in Zajal, as well as structurally to certain types of lyric songs of the Italian Peninsula; such as stornelli and strambotti.

One of the earliest mentions of għana on record is from 1791. A French knight, François-Emmanuel Guignard, comte de Saint-Priest, published a book called Malte par une Voyageur Francais, which included the lyrics of three għanjiet (songs), as transcribed for him by a Maltese librarian, Gioacchino Navarro.

== Informal Għana ==
Throughout its history, informal għana situations frequently occurred among both men and women. The informal sessions shed light on the importance of the music in day-to-day life of the Maltese. The very origins of għana can be traced back to early peasant farmers.

A book published in 1838 by Anglican missionary and orientalist George Percy Badger titled Description of Malta and Gozo includes examples of Maltese folk songs, accompanied by his comments, such as to highlight the talent of the Maltese for rhyming. He even describes seeing singers engaged in dialogic singing, who reply to each another in song:

I have often stood and listened to individuals seated upon two opposite trees, or engaged in some kind of labour, singing answers to each other in rhyme, without any previous meditation. This the natives call taqbeel. The subjects vary according to circumstances, sometimes partaking of the nature of epic poetry, and sometimes of satire upon the faults of character of each.

Professor Philip Ciantar, in his article From the Bar to the Stage puts together the writings of a number of foreign and Maltese scholars who make the claim early għana instances represents both the "simple [...] life of the Maltese working class", and the "intact natural environment of the island". Ciantar argues that the roots of għana are buried deep within traditional Maltese way of life, so much so that the two become synonymous with each other. Such a description by the scholar Joseph Aquilina published in 1931, for instance, emphasises this link between the people and għana:

How lovely it is, to hear from a remote and abandoned village amidst our island's hills, during a moonlit evening, while the cricket is hidden among the tomato plants, breaking the evening's silence, a handsome and healthy young man, swarthy as our country makes him, singing his għana ceaselessly. His soul would seemingly burst open with his singing!

Ciantar argues that these songs evoke the very roots of Maltese poetry and literature, a claim that is also supported by Dun Karm Psaila, Malta's national poet. In an article on the origin of Maltese poetry, Ciantar says, Psaila goes on to link għana to the "modest recreation and aspirations of the common people".

Both scholars, Aquilina and Psaila, place għana in the 'intact' natural environment of the island. Psaila wrote:

... one could listen to għana songs, accompanied by a guitar or an accordion, sung by men and women on sea coasts and during popular feasts such as Lapsi (Ascension Day). Youths used to sing għana love-songs in the open country, or the streets, or in houses during work-time even at bars such as "Viva iz-zejza".

In this way għana was a way to pass the time during recreation, as well as to sing while working.

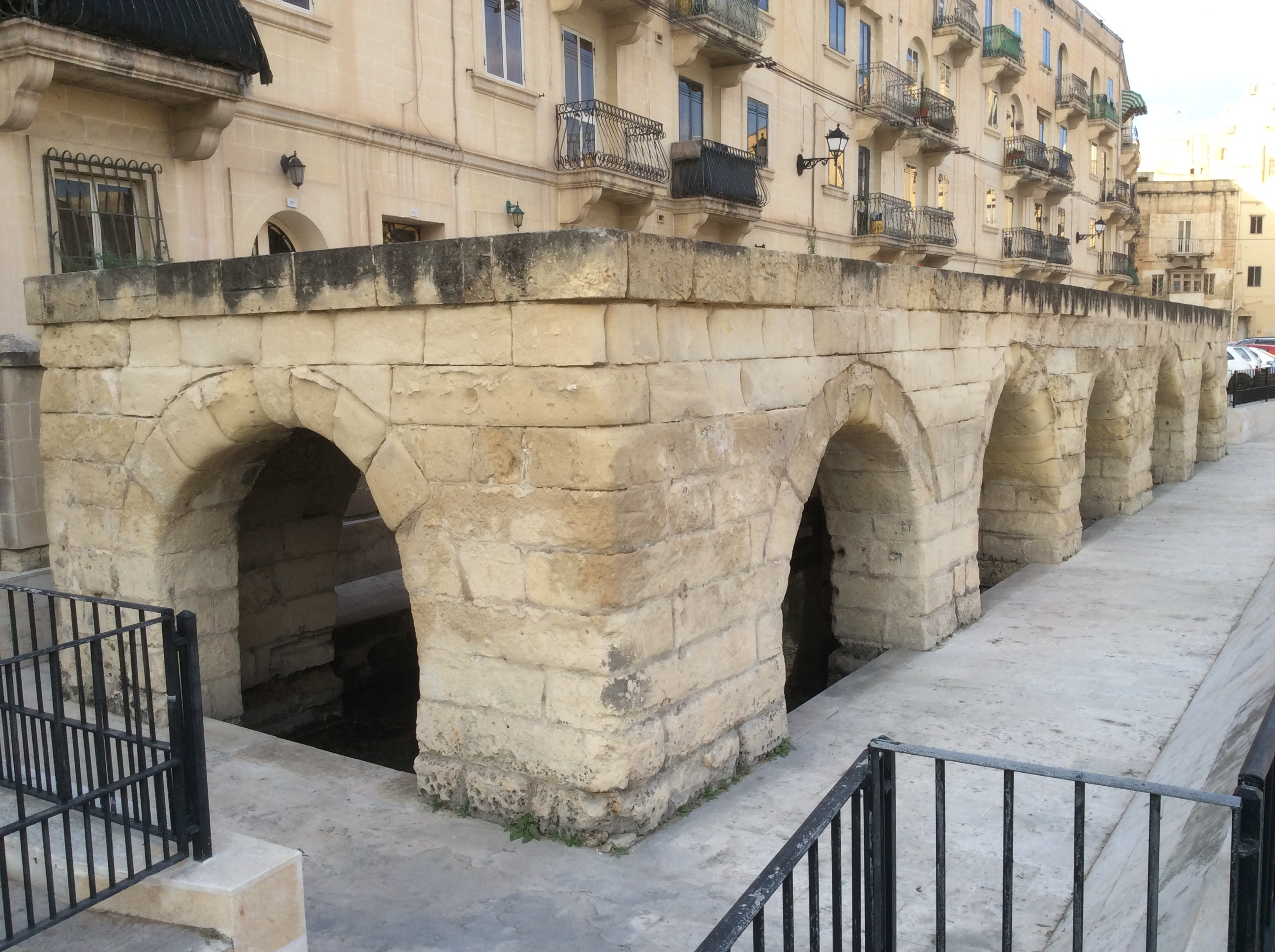
The għajn tal-ħasselin at Msida

One way għana was practiced was by the women singing on rooftops or in old communal washhouses, known as the għajn tal-ħasselin ("spring of the washers"). Washhouses were carved out of naturally forming caves around the island where water flows in a constant stream, providing a place to wash clothes. Like many other societies, men were the labourers and the women tended to the needs of the household.

== Formal Għana ==
There are 3 main types of għana: fil-Għoli, tal-Fatt and Spirtu Pront.

Għana fil-Għoli, meaning "in the high register", is also known as tal-Bormliża, taking its name from the city of Bormla where it was popular. It is a greatly demanding style which requires the singer to have a lot of vocal power and control, and was often sung by women because of the vocal features needed. A style which uses a lot of melisma, it is both difficult to sing and to understand, and requires a high-pitched voice. The latter feature shows a strong possibility that the style was generally sung by women, though it was eventually picked up by men, requiring them to reach into extraordinarily high soprano ranges without breaking into falsetto. Women became less represented in the field of għana. John Chircop, published in 1993, stated that very few women still sang in this style and that renowned women għannejja were rare. He cited two of the most popular as Kuncetta Borġ (nicknamed Il-Bormliża) and Maria Abela.

Għana tal-Fatt literally means 'fact' or 'actually happened'. This melancholic ballad style involves one għannej recounting a story about well known local identities, events or recent interesting or humorous happenings, Maltese folktales and legends. It can be in the form of "an epic, a community or family history, or just an autobiographical happening". It stands out as the leading non-improvised form of għana. The oldest documented traditional Maltese song is the ballad "L-Għarusa ta' Mosta" ('The Bride of Mosta'), based on events in the 1500s and still sung. Many suggest mythical struggles or good versus evil, the latter of which may have "oppressed an individual, family, class or nation". The hero is the central figure in plot, and if they are a "bandit-hero" then emphasis is placed on their strength, cunning, and wit. John Chircop wrote that true stories in which "horrible murders, crimes and revenge in which real people - sometimes still alive - are named" were the most popular. In the lyrics the date and time of the tragedy is emphasised and the whole spectacle is described in thorough detail.

Spirtu pront translates as 'quick spirit' (or wit), and originated from informal 'song duels'.

Other types of għana are: bil-Qasma and tal-Makjetta. Għana bil-Qasma means "broken singing". In this style the first singer starts the first two lines, and then the second singer continues the rest of the stanza. Usually the singer who finishes the last two verses will start the next stanza. Għana tal-Makjetta is a humorous style usually accompanied on the guitar by major chords.

== Spirtu Pront ==
In Spirtu Pront sessions, two or more għannejja (singers) are paired together and take part in an improvised song duel in the form of duets, with a riposte and counter-riposte (botta u risposta). If four singers are involved, the first will sing with the third, and the second with the fourth.

The ideal vocal range is that of a high tenor. Many singers are not formally taught, but learn from accompanying their elders. The lyrics demonstrate their knowledge of a wide range of social topics as well as their command of the Maltese language. Encouraging the transmission of political or moral beliefs with "crude satire and double entendres". Within this, the għannej shows off a capacity for "impromptu creativity, cunning, satirical depiction and subtle political criticism".

Sessions take around an hour in duration, and there may be a number of sessions that make up a whole performance. The għannejja sing in a highly expressive, free flowing style. Their improvised melodic lines borrow heavily from Arabic influenced scales. Although improvisation is definitely an element, it is never the focus.

Once a session has commenced, għannejja must participate for the entire duration, and no new singer can join. The għannejja usually begin with an introductory comment about who is taking part in the session. This section acts as a way of easing into the bout, but has more recently been used as a way of identifying participants during taped performances. The għannejja then begin discussing the topic. This would either be predetermined, or it will be established during the course of a session, just as a conversation would. Għana is not used to settle personal differences or arguments between singers. The song subjects' themes themselves are dramatic and grave, even if dealt with wittily. They may be "personal honour, reflections on social values, or political (in the narrow sense of the word)".

Għannejja vie with each other regarding their ability to sing without searching for words. Singers must display their superior knowledge in the topic, while adhering to a number of formal constraints. For instance, their improvised responses must rhyme in a scheme of a-b-c-b, and phrases should be in an 8, 7, 8, 7 syllabic structure. The best għannejja use "metaphors, archaic words, [and] proverbs". Occasionally, depending on the għannej, the language used is overtly self-righteous. Ultimately, this type of practice creates tension between competing għannejja. In most cases, the għannejja would be shaking hands with their opponent, similar to a sporting match, showing that what they are saying is only for entertainment and they do not mean to cause any offence.

In contemporary Malta, this style of għana is performed by urban working class men mainly in village bars and clubs. Ciantar in an article published in 2000 wrote that "almost no women sing it". Spirtu pront in particular is so popular that the term għana is sometimes used specifically to refer to this kind of singing by both those involved with the genre and the general public. Sessions are organised on popular feasts, such as Imnarja, and during Maltese 'traditional evenings' that might be held in the week building up to the village or town festa. It is sometimes broadcast on radio and television, especially on Sunday mornings.

== Accompaniment ==
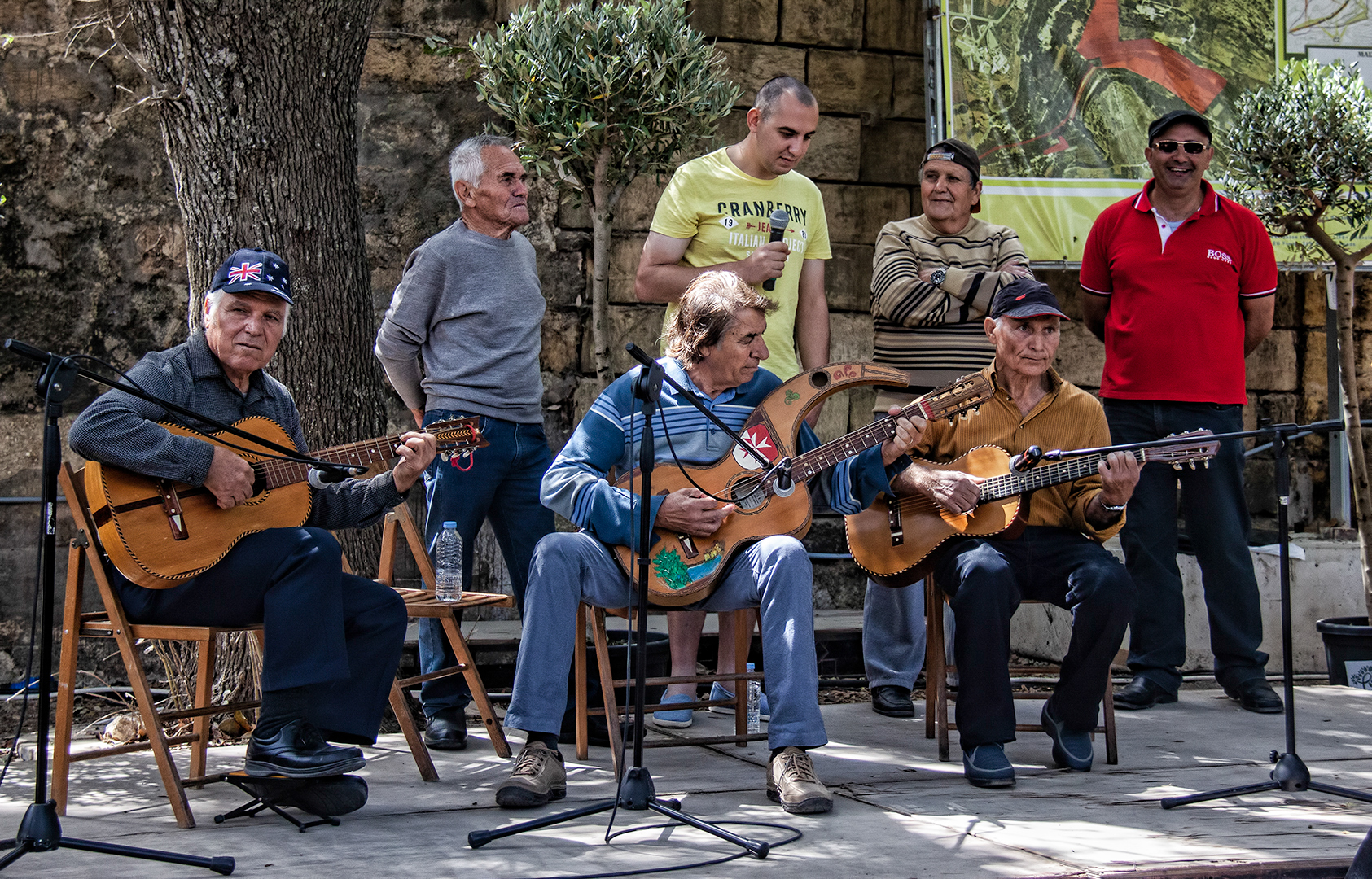
L-għannejja and musicians in Buskett Gardens, 2016

=== Instrumentation ===
The accompaniment is provided by three guitars usually strumming Western influenced tonic to dominant chordal progressions. This gives għana a very unusual sound, not quite Eastern, but not quite Western.

The trio of guitarists consists of il-prim, who improvises around traditional motifs, and two daqqaqa akkompanjaturi who play in accompaniment based on simple triads.

The prim has to join in with the same type of accompaniment as the others during the singing. Then improvises motifs during the introduction, the conclusion, and during the qalba; the interval between the sung verses giving the next għannej (singer) time to prepare a response to his opponents' remarks.

The għana guitar is modelled on the Spanish guitar, and is described by Marcia Herndon as:

... a standard instrument, with metal frets and turning keys, metal strings, and traditional decorations on the front. It differs from the standard guitar only in that there are two sizes. The solo guitar is slightly smaller than the accompanying instruments. This, along with the method of tuning, indicates the presence in Malta of an older tradition of guitar playing which has almost died out elsewhere in the Mediterranean. The guitars are played with or without the use of a pick.

In the most frequently used 'La' accompaniment (akkumpanjament fuq il-La), the strings of the lead guitar will be tuned to E–A–D–G–B–E while those of the second accompanying guitars will be tuned a minor third lower, except for the bottom string: E–F#–B–E–G#–C#. The tone quality of these locally produced guitars is described by Ciantar as "very compact, with very low bass resonance". Such tuning is through to better facilitate the technical demands imposed on the lead guitarist in the creation of new motifs and variations. Ciantar describes the genre's common musical structure as:

In the introductory section a series of rhythmical and intervallic structures are created and developed; this same rhythmical and melodic material is then reiterated in the second section by both the għannejja and the lead guitarist. The frequent use of syncopation and descent melodic movements, for instance, form part of the formal structure of both the singing and instrumental soloing in the spirtu pront; these are structural elements announced in the introductory section as to establish the style of both għana singing and playing.

=== Prejjem ===
During spirtu pront, the prim begins improvising from a 'restricted' repertory of għana motifs. This section is known as the prejjem. These motifs are popular, not only among aficionados, but also outside of the għana community by the general Maltese public. The lead guitarist begins with an introductory section accompanied by the strumming of triadic, diatonic chords provided by the other guitarists. As soon as the former completes his improvisation he joins the other guitarists in the accompaniment based on the tonic and dominant of the established key. The function of this introductory section is to establish the tonality and tempo for the session. Tonality changes from one session to another in a whole performance, depending on what collectively suits the singers.

== Famous Għana musicians ==
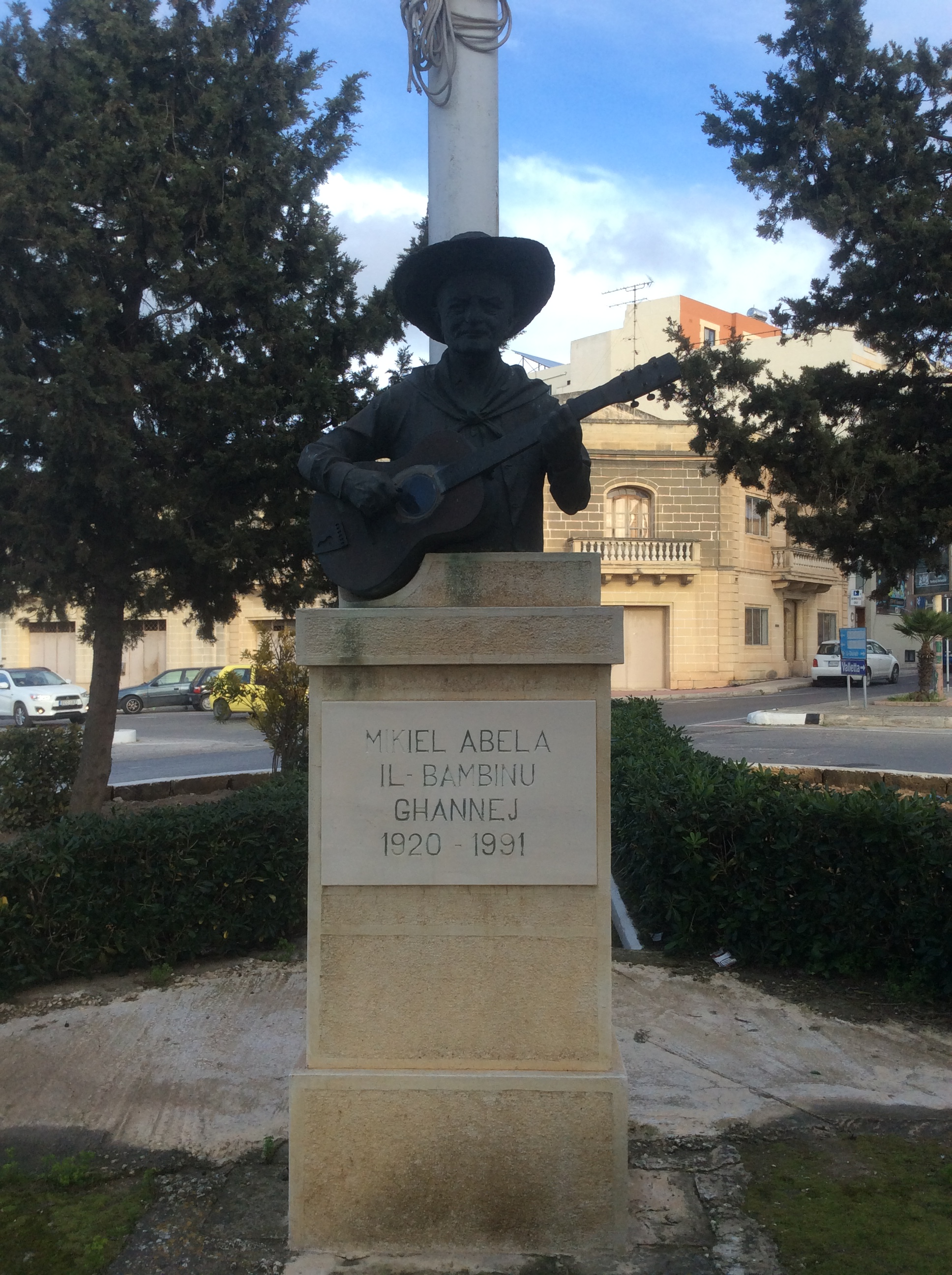
Monument to Mikiel Abela il-Bambinu in Żejtun

- Fredu Abela "il-Bamboċċu" (1944–2003)
- Mikiel Abela "il-Bambinu" (1920–1991)
- Leli Azzopardi "il-Bugazz" (1928–2003)
- Frans Baldacchino "il-Budaj" (1943–2006)
- Ġużeppi Camilleri "il-Jimmy tal-Fjur" (1917–1994)
- Tony Camilleri "l-Għannej"
- Emmanuele Cilia "Ta' Napuljun" (1889-1967)
- Salvu Darmanin "ir-Ruġel" (1905–1976)
- Pawlu Degabriele "il-Bies" (1908–1980)
- Grezzju Ellul "ta' Ċanċa" (1926–1996)
- Sam Farrugia "tal-Carabott" (1933–2002)
- Guzeppi Meli "Ta' Sika" (1929–2009)
- Żaru Mifsud "l-Għaxqi" (1933–2001)
- Żaren Mifsud "ta' Vestru" (1924–1999)
- Bastjan Micallef "Ir-Rabti" (1936–2002)
- Toni Pullicino "it-Tullier" (1927–1968)
- Rozina Sciberras "tat-Trott" (1880–1959)
- Fredu Spiteri "l-Everest" (1929–1965)
- Ġammari Spiteri "Amletu" (1907–1962)
- Leli Sultana "Il-Moni" (1921–2003)
- Karmnu Xuereb "In-Namru" (1911–1997)
- Pawlu Seychell "l-Għannej" (1907-1992)
- Ninu Galea "l-Kalora" (1922-2012)
