= Burmarrad =

- Administrative Committee
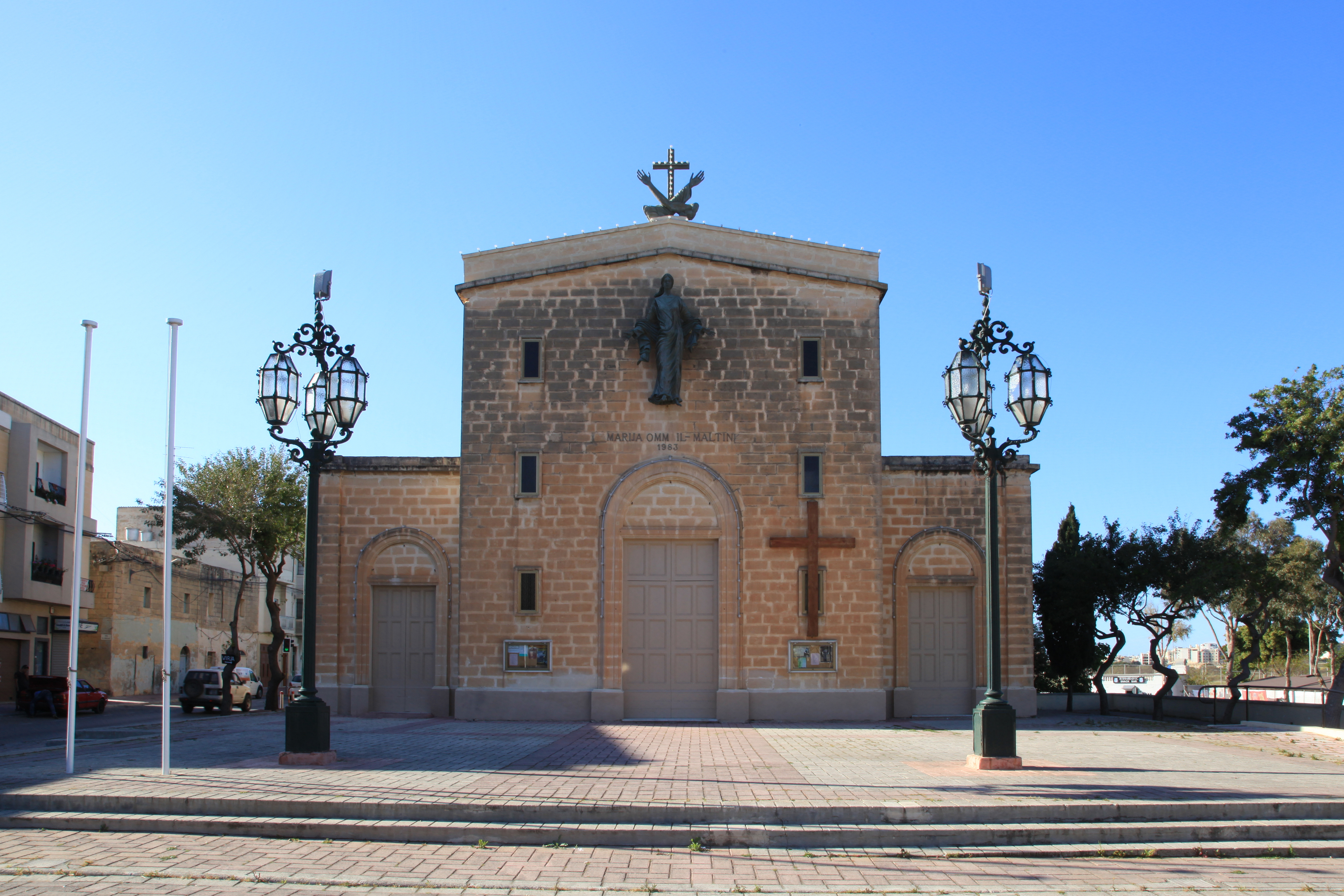
- Burmarrad Parish Church dedicated to the Sacred Heart of Mary(Qalb bla' Tebgha ta' Marija)

- Location within Malta
- Coordinates: 35.9349°N 14.4143°E
- Country: Malta
- Island: Malta Island

Population
  - Total: 1,300

Burmarrad is a hamlet in St. Paul's Bay, Malta. The main heritage site is the San Pawl Milqi zone, where there is a chapel dedicated to St. Paul, built on the remains of a Roman temple dedicated to Apollo, and according to tradition the remains of the home of St. Publius. The Parish Church dedicated to the Immaculate Heart Of Mary was built in 1964. The village feast is celebrated on the last Sunday of June. Burmarrad forms part of the Saint Paul's Bay local council

== Overview ==
The name 'Burmarrad' may refer to the village's proximity to the sea. It is generally accepted that the name, in old Maltese, refers to a settlement upon the marshes. The original word was 'bur marradi', where the "bur" refers to a well, while "marradi" means sickly. Conjoined, this means that the water in the marshes was contaminated, hence bur marradi, and later Burmarrad. Burmarrad retains a number of farms, primarily centred on agriculture.

Several archeological remains have been found in the whereabouts.

The parish priest since 2016 is P. Christian Anthony Borg.

This village is home to the residence of Joseph Muscat, former Prime Minister of Malta.

Burmarrad Road passes through Burmarrad, leading to Mosta.
