= Maltese folklore =

Folk tales and traditions of Malta

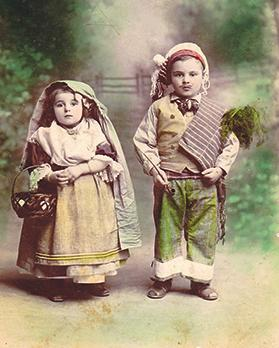
A photograph by S.L.Cassar, taken around 1910, showing siblings Emmanuel and Mary Xuereb in carnival costume as Żepp and Grezz, stereotypical village man and his wife.

Maltese folklore is the folk tradition which has developed in Malta over the centuries, and expresses the cultural identity of the Maltese people. Maltese folklore, traditions and legends still live in the minds of the older-generations, and these are slowly being studied and categorized, like any other European tradition. A number of national and international folklore festivals are undertaken on an annual basis, some of which are under the patronage of the National Folklore Commission and the Ministry for Culture and the Arts. Notably, every December the Malta International Folk Festival is staged in Valletta, with delegates from countries around the world.

== Weddings ==
Traditional Maltese weddings featured the bridal party walking in procession beneath an ornate canopy, from the home of the bride's family to the parish church, with singers trailing behind serenading the bride and groom. The Maltese word for this custom is il-ġilwa. This custom along with many others has long since disappeared from the Islands, in the face of modern practices.

New wives would wear the għonnella, a traditional item of Maltese clothing. However, it is no longer worn in modern Malta. Today's couples are married in churches, chapels or hotels in the village or town of their choice. The nuptials are usually followed by a lavish wedding reception, often including several hundred guests. Occasionally, couples will try to incorporate elements of the traditional Maltese wedding in their celebration.

There has been a recent resurgence of interest in traditional weddings. The annually held Maltese Traditional Wedding in the Village of Żurrieq is one of the most popular wedding places. Around May of each year, thousands of Maltese and tourists attend a traditional Maltese wedding in the style of the 16th century. This includes il-ġilwa, which leads the bride and groom to a wedding ceremony in various places such as the parvis of St. Andrew's Chapel. The reception that follows features folklore music (għana) and dancing. In September 2008, the 3rd Edition of the Qala International Folk Festival in Gozo featured "It-Tieg fl-Antik". This re-enactment of a traditional Gozitan wedding was officiated at Bishop Michael Buttigieg Square in front of the stone cross column, after which, a procession with the newly weds, led up to the Main Square of the village of Qala, where a typical ‘festin’ was awaiting them, serving traditional delicacies of the period.

== Birth and childhood ==
Traditional Maltese proverbs reveal a cultural preoccupation with childbearing and fertility: "iż-żwieġ mingħajr tarbija ma fihx tgawdija" (a childless marriage cannot be a happy one). This is a belief that Malta shares with many other Mediterranean cultures, most notably, Israel, Palestine, Morocco and Tunisia. In Maltese folktales, the local variant of the classic closing formula, "and they all lived happily ever after" is "u għammru u tgħammru, u spiċċat" (and they lived together, and they had children together, and the tale is finished).

Rural Malta shares in common with Mediterranean and traditional Jewish society a number of superstitions regarding fertility, menstruation, and pregnancy, including the avoidance of cemeteries during the months leading up to childbirth, and avoiding the preparation of certain foods during menses. Pregnant women are encouraged to satisfy their cravings for specific foods, out of fear that their unborn child will bear a representational birth mark (Maltese: xewqa, literally "desire" or "craving"). Maltese and Sicilian women also share certain traditions that are believed to predict the sex of an unborn child, such as the cycle of the moon on the anticipated date of birth, whether the baby is carried "high" or "low" during pregnancy, and the movement of a wedding ring, dangled on a string above the abdomen (sideways denoting a girl, back and forth denoting a boy).

Traditionally, Maltese newborns were baptised as promptly as possible, partly out of fear of limbo should the child die in infancy, and partly because according to Maltese (and Sicilian) folklore an unbaptised child is not yet a Christian, but "still a Turk". Traditional Maltese delicacies served at a baptismal feast include biskuttini tal-magħmudija (almond macaroons covered in white or pink icing), it-torta tal-marmorata (a spicy, heart-shaped tart of chocolate-flavoured almond paste), and a liqueur known as rożolin, made with rose petals, violets and almonds.

On a child's first birthday, in a tradition that still survives today, Maltese parents would organize a game known as il-quċċija, where a variety of symbolic objects would be randomly placed around the seated child. These may include a hard-boiled egg (they grow into wealth), a Bible (they become priests), crucifix or rosary beads (they become clerics), a book, and so on. Whichever object the child shows most interest in is said to reveal the child's path and fortunes in adulthood.

Money refers to a rich future while a book expresses intelligence and a possible career as a teacher. Infants who select a pencil or pen will be writers. Choosing bibles or rosary beads refers to a clerical or monastic life. If the child chooses a hard-boiled egg, it will have a long life and bear many children. More recent additions include calculators (refers to accounting), thread (fashion) and wooden spoons (cooking and a great appetite).

== Folktales ==
In the early years of the twentieth century, Maltese folktales were collected by the Jesuit scholar Manwel Magri and published in the series Kotba tal-Mogħdija taż-Żmien and also in the collection Ħrejjef Missirijietna ("tales from our fathers"). This collection of material inspired subsequent researchers and academics to gather traditional tales, fables and legends from all over the Archipelago.

Magri's work also inspired a series of comic books released by Klabb Kotba Maltin in 1984. The titles included Bin is-Sultan Jiżżewweġ x-Xebba tat-Tronġiet Mewwija and Ir-Rjieħ. Some of the stories are about giants, witches and dragons; others are about imaginary Maltese beings. These include the kawkaw or gawgaw, a grey and slimy creature who roamed the streets at night and could smell out naughty boys and Il-Belliegħa, a monster that lived in wells and could pull in children who looked into them.

In 2014, Stephan D. Mifsud published The Maltese Bestiary: An Illustrated Guide to the Mythical Flora and Fauna of the Maltese Islands, an encyclopedia of Maltese monsters from folktales. Mifsud worked as a biologist with an interest in unusual creatures. Within his work, he discusses how he has managed to find large collections of monsters and creatures from other cultures, but noticed a gap in research on Maltese creatures despite his knowledge that many creatures were cited in Maltese folklore. This lead him to create his own compendium of Maltese monsters, similar to what is available for Greek or Norse legendary beasts.

== Other festivities ==
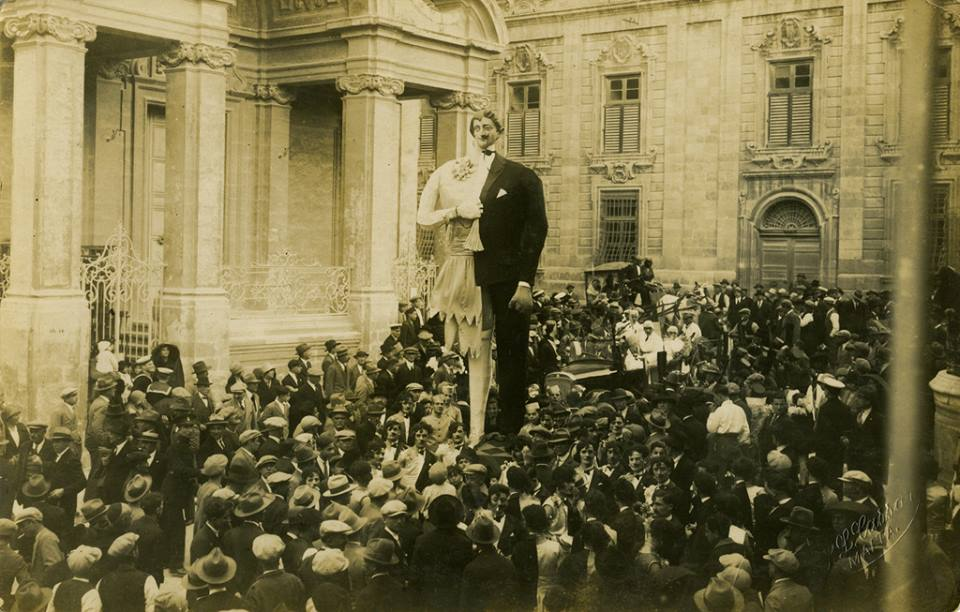
S.L.Cassar, Valletta carnival, ca. 1900

=== Carnival ===
Maltese Carnival (Maltese: il-karnival ta' Malta) has had an important place on the cultural calendar for just under five centuries, introduced to the Islands by Grand Master Piero de Ponte in 1535. It is held during the week leading up to Ash Wednesday, and typically includes masked balls, fancy dress and grotesque mask competitions, lavish late-night parties, a colourful, ticker-tape parade of allegorical floats presided over by King Carnival (Maltese: ir-Re tal-Karnival), marching bands and costumed revellers.

=== Holy Week ===
Holy Week (Maltese: il-Ġimgħa Mqaddsa) starts on Palm Sunday (Ħadd il-Palm) and ends on Easter Sunday (Ħadd il-Għid). Numerous religious traditions, most of them inherited from one generation to the next, are part of the paschal celebrations in the Maltese Islands, honouring the death and resurrection of Jesus.

=== Mnarja ===
Mnarja, or l-Imnarja (pronounced lim-nar-ya) is one of the most important dates on the Maltese cultural calendar. Officially, it is a national festival dedicated to the feast of Saints Peter and St. Paul. In fact its roots can be traced back to the pagan Roman feast of Luminaria (literally, "the illumination"), when the early summer night of June 29 was illuminated by torches and bonfires. A national feast since the rule of the Order of St. John, Mnarja is a traditional Maltese festival of food, religion and music.

The festivities still commence today with the reading of the "bandu", an official governmental announcement, which has been read on this day in Malta since the 16th century. Originally, Mnarja was celebrated outside St. Paul's Grotto, in the north of Malta; however, by 1613 the focus of the festivities had shifted to the Cathedral of St. Paul, in Mdina, and featured torchlight processions, the firing of 100 petards, horseraces, and races for men, boys and slaves.

Modern Mnarja festivals take place in and around the woodlands of Buskett, just outside the town of Rabat.

It is said that under the Knights, this was the one day in the year when the Maltese were allowed to hunt and eat wild rabbit, which was otherwise reserved for the hunting pleasures of the Knights. The close connection between Mnarja and rabbit stew (Maltese: "fenkata") remains strong today. In 1854 British governor William Reid launched an agricultural show at Buskett which is still being held today. The farmers' exhibition is still a seminal part of the Mnarja festivities today.

Mnarja today is one of the few occasions when participants may hear traditional Maltese "għana". Traditionally, grooms would promise to take their newly or recently wed brides to Mnarja during the first of year of marriage and, for luck, many of the brides would attend in their full wedding gown and veil, although this custom has long since disappeared from the Islands.

== Music ==
The ċuqlajta is a traditional instrument which includes different types of wooden clappers and ratchets which produce a variety of sounds. One particular type of clapper dates to Roman times and can still be seen in folkbands particularly in Gozo.

=== Parish bands ===
Virtually every parish in Malta has a band club (Maltese: il-każin tal-banda), and in some cases, two. The bands typically consist of woodwind and brass instruments, and percussion. They are feature performers in the village festa, accompanying the statue of the parish's titular saint with celebratory music. Their music is very similar to their Sicilian and Southern Italian counterparts.

Although drums and flutes are known to have participated in religious processions in Malta as early as the 16th century, today's Maltese band clubs are a more recent introduction to Maltese culture, from around the 19th century, at the height of British rule. The village bands were in part assembled in response to, and heavily influenced by, the marching bands of the British military. Indeed, the oldest of today's Maltese bands was set up by Filippo Galea whose father was a bandmaster with the British military. A few years after setting up his band (Banda di San Filippo) in 1851 in Zebbug, Filippo followed in his father's footsteps and made a distinguished military career as a bandmaster. Other renowned Maltese musicians like Indri Borg are also accredited with the setting up of bands of which only one survives to this day (L-Isle Adam Band of Rabat, founded in 1860), although Maestro Borg also took charge of the Banda di San Filippo in 1860. However, throughout the 1800s, Malta experienced a steady influx of Sicilian and Italian refugees and immigrants, fleeing from civil war or under sentence of exile, who stimulated and popularized the concept of a village band.

== Feasts ==
Local festivals celebrating the patron saint of the local parish, similar to those in southern Italy, are commonplace in Malta. Several festi take place in different towns and villages across Malta every weekend in the summer. A festa reaches its apex with a High Mass featuring a sermon on the life and achievements of the patron saint, after which a statue of the religious patron is taken around the local streets in solemn procession, with the faithful following in respectful prayer. The religious atmosphere quickly gives way to several days of revelry, band processions, fireworks, and late night parties.

In the weeks leading up to a local festa, the main streets around the parish are richly decorated, with brocade banners, ornate religious sculptures mounted on pedestals and, all around the zuntier (parvis) of the parish church, hawkers set up stalls stocked with food and the local variety of nougat. The parish church itself is typically illuminated at night, although the fjakkoli (flaming lanterns) of yesteryear have been supplanted by bright-coloured electric bulbs.

Some of the seaside towns feature a unique and popular medieval game known as the ġostra. Although the word itself is derived from the Italian giostra, Maltese ġostra has little in common with medieval jousting, and is in fact derived from the Neapolitan game of the Cockaigne pole. It involves a 10-metre long greased pole, mounted on a barge out in the bay, perched on a precarious angle out over the sea. Competing youths scramble up the pole, in an attempt to snatch a pennant, flag or other trophy from the top of the pole.

== See also ==
- Għana (folk music)
- Maltese cuisine
