= List of monuments in San Lawrenz =

This is a list of monuments in San Lawrenz, Gozo, Malta, which are listed on the National Inventory of the Cultural Property of the Maltese Islands.

== List ==
Name of object	Location	Coordinates	ID	Photo	Upload
Ras il-Wardija		36°02′12″N 14°11′14″E	00002	Ras il-Wardija	Upload Photo
Dwejra Tower	Triq il-Ġebla tal-Ġeneral, Dwejra	36°02′58″N 14°11′31″E	00040	Dwejra Tower	Upload Photo
Niche of Christ the Nazarene	35 Triq San Lawrenz	36°03′20″N 14°12′14″E	00964		Upload Photo
Parish Church of Saint Lawrence	Pjazza San Lawrenz	36°03′20″N 14°12′13″E	00965	Parish Church of Saint Lawrence	Upload Photo
Niche of the Madonna of Sorrows	40 Triq San Lawrenz c/w 49 Triq id-Duluri	36°03′19″N 14°12′14″E	00966		Upload Photo
Niche of Saint Lawrence	5 Triq Wied Merill	36°03′16″N 14°12′08″E	00967		Upload Photo
Chapel of Saint Anne	Triq il-Ġebla tal-Ġeneral, Dwejra	36°03′10″N 14°11′24″E	00968	Chapel of Saint Anne	Upload Photo
n/a	15 Triq il-Wileġ	36°03′25″N 14°12′04″E	02593		Upload Photo
