= List of monuments in Żebbuġ =

This is a list of monuments in Żebbuġ, Malta, which are listed on the National Inventory of the Cultural Property of the Maltese Islands.

== List ==
Name of object	Location	Coordinates	ID	Photo	Upload
Chapel of Our Lady of forsaken souls	Triq il-Madonna (Note: The same chapel is also listed as NICPMI Inv. No. 02265.)	35°52′09″N 14°26′24″E	00007	Chapel of Our Lady of forsaken souls	Upload Photo
Villa Buleben	Triq il-Madonna	35°52′09″N 14°26′24″E	01245	Villa Buleben	Upload Photo
Il-Gnien Tal-Kmand	Triq it-Tiġrija c/w Triq il-Buskett	35°52′11″N 14°24′53″E	01246	Il-Gnien Tal-Kmand	Upload Photo
Chapel of Saint Roque	316 Triq il-Kbira c/w Triq San Rokku	35°52′22″N 14°26′45″E	02208	Chapel of Saint Roque	Upload Photo
Niche of St Roque	Triq il-Kbira c/w Triq Mamo	35°52′22″N 14°26′44″E	02209	Niche of St Roque	Upload Photo
Chapel of St. Mary	Triq Mamo	35°52′19″N 14°26′42″E	02210	Chapel of St. Mary	Upload Photo
Niche of Saint John the Evangelist	1/2 Triq Mula	35°52′17″N 14°26′39″E	02211	Niche of Saint John the Evangelist	Upload Photo
Niche of Saint Nicholas of Bari	28 Triq Sant'Antnin c/w Triq Mula	35°52′17″N 14°26′38″E	02212	Niche of Saint Nicholas of Bari	Upload Photo
Niche of Saint Philip of Agira	28 Triq Sant'Antnin c/w 1 Triq is-Siġġiewi	35°52′17″N 14°26′37″E	02213	Niche of Saint Philip of Agira	Upload Photo
Chapel of Saint Joseph	Misraħ L-Isptar	35°52′15″N 14°26′35″E	02214	Chapel of Saint Joseph	Upload Photo
Niche of the Immaculate Conception	Misraħ L-Isptar, Sqaq Nru. 2	35°52′14″N 14°26′35″E	02215	Niche of the Immaculate Conception	Upload Photo
Niche of the Madonna of Mount Carmel	40 Triq Sant'Antnin c/w Triq il-Knisja	35°52′17″N 14°26′33″E	02216	Niche of the Madonna of Mount Carmel	Upload Photo
Niche of Saint Joseph	14 Triq Sant'Antnin c/w Triq il-Knisja	35°52′17″N 14°26′34″E	02217	Niche of Saint Joseph	Upload Photo
Statue of Saint John the Evangelist	Misraħ San Filep (opposite Triq il-Kbira)	35°52′17″N 14°26′31″E	02218	Statue of Saint John the Evangelist	Upload Photo
Statue of St Joseph	Misraħ San Filep (opposite Triq il-Kbira)	35°52′17″N 14°26′32″E	02219	Statue of St Joseph	Upload Photo
Niche of St Paul	Misraħ San Filep (on the right in front of the church)	35°52′17″N 14°26′30″E	02220	Niche of St Paul	Upload Photo
Niche of Saint Philip of Aggira	Misraħ San Filep (on the left in front of the church)	35°52′17″N 14°26′30″E	02221	Niche of Saint Philip of Aggira	Upload Photo
Niche of St. Anthony of Padua	Triq il-Knisja (opposite Triq il-Parroċċa)	35°52′16″N 14°26′31″E	02222	Niche of St. Anthony of Padua	Upload Photo
Niche of Saint Lawrence	Triq il-Knisja (opposite Triq il-Parroċċa)	35°52′16″N 14°26′31″E	02223	Niche of Saint Lawrence	Upload Photo
Parish Church of Saint Philip of Agira	Misraħ San Filep	35°52′17″N 14°26′32″E	02224	Parish Church of Saint Philip of Agira	Upload Photo
Cross	Misraħ San Filep	35°52′17″N 14°26′29″E	02225	Cross	Upload Photo
Niche of the Immaculate Conception	260 Triq il-Kbira	35°52′18″N 14°26′31″E	02226	Niche of the Immaculate Conception	Upload Photo
Niche of the Sacred Heart of Jesus	270/271 Triq il-Kbira	35°52′19″N 14°26′33″E	02227	Niche of the Sacred Heart of Jesus	Upload Photo
Niche of St Paul	"Villa San Filep", 65 Triq il-Kbira	35°52′19″N 14°26′35″E	02228	Niche of St Paul	Upload Photo
Niche of the Madonna of Mount Carmel	313 Triq il-Kbira	35°52′22″N 14°26′44″E	02229	Niche of the Madonna of Mount Carmel	Upload Photo
Niche of the Immaculate Conception	"Santa Rita", 7 Triq il-Kbira c/w Triq il-Kbira, Sqaq Nru. 1	35°52′25″N 14°26′52″E	02230	Niche of the Immaculate Conception	Upload Photo
Niche of the Ecce Homo	De Rohan Arch, Triq il-Kbira c/w Triq L-Imdina	35°52′26″N 14°26′53″E	02231	Niche of the Ecce Homo	Upload Photo
Chapel of the Immaculate Conception	Triq L-Imdina	35°52′25″N 14°27′03″E	02232	Chapel of the Immaculate Conception	Upload Photo
Niche of Christ the Saviour	330 Triq il-Kbira	35°52′24″N 14°26′49″E	02233	Niche of Christ the Saviour	Upload Photo
Relief of Christ the King	"Kristu Re", 14 Vjal il-Ħelsien	35°52′24″N 14°26′32″E	02234	Relief of Christ the King	Upload Photo
Niche of St. Philip of Agira	"Dar il-Mulej", 107 Triq De Rohan	35°52′22″N 14°26′39″E	02235	Niche of St. Philip of Agira	Upload Photo
Niche of the Madonna of Mount Carmel	"M. Dolores", 11 Vjal il-Ħelsien	35°52′24″N 14°26′33″E	02236	Niche of the Madonna of Mount Carmel	Upload Photo
Chapel of the Annunciation	Triq il-Kbira c/w Triq il-Lunzjata	35°52′22″N 14°26′18″E	02237	Chapel of the Annunciation	Upload Photo
Niche of the Annunciation	133 Triq il-Kbira c/w 19 Triq il-Lunzjata	35°52′23″N 14°26′17″E	02238	Niche of the Annunciation	Upload Photo
Chapel of the Madonna of Sorrows	Triq il-Kbira c/w Triq Frans Sammut	35°52′19″N 14°26′26″E	02239	Chapel of the Madonna of Sorrows	Upload Photo
Niche of St. Philip of Agira	14 Triq Frans Sammut	35°52′20″N 14°26′27″E	02240	Niche of St. Philip of Agira	Upload Photo
Chapel of the Risen Christ	Triq Paris (Cemetery - opposite Triq Sciortino)	35°52′28″N 14°26′31″E	02241	Chapel of the Risen Christ	Upload Photo
Chapel of the Madonna of Graces	Triq tal-Grazzja (opposite Triq Xmun Attard)	35°52′16″N 14°26′14″E	02242	Chapel of the Madonna of Graces	Upload Photo
Statue of the Madonna of Graces	Triq tal-Grazzja (in front of the church)	35°52′17″N 14°26′14″E	02243	Statue of the Madonna of Graces	Upload Photo
Niche of the Immaculate Conception	124 Triq tal-Grazzja	35°52′17″N 14°26′13″E	02244	Niche of the Immaculate Conception	Upload Photo
Niche of the Madonna of Good Health	Triq il-Mitħna (opposite Triq tal-Grazzja)	35°52′16″N 14°26′06″E	02245	Niche of the Madonna of Good Health	Upload Photo
Niche of St Roque	Triq il-Mitħna (windmill)	35°52′15″N 14°26′04″E	02246	Niche of St Roque	Upload Photo
Niche of St. Anthony of Padua	Triq il-Buskett c/w Triq Filippu Grech	35°52′14″N 14°26′02″E	02247	Niche of St. Anthony of Padua	Upload Photo
Niche of the Madonna of Mount Carmel	Tal-Karmnu Farm, Triq il-Buskett	35°52′13″N 14°25′58″E	02248	Niche of the Madonna of Mount Carmel	Upload Photo
Niche of St Michael	41/43 Triq tal-Grazzja	35°52′18″N 14°26′22″E	02249	Niche of St Michael	Upload Photo
Niche of the Immaculate Conception	37 Triq tal-Grazzja	35°52′18″N 14°26′22″E	02250	Niche of the Immaculate Conception	Upload Photo
Niche of St Joseph	Triq Vilhena c/w Triq Sidtna ta' L-Anġli	35°52′17″N 14°26′24″E	02251	Niche of St Joseph	Upload Photo
Niche of the Madonna of Mount Carmel			02252		Upload Photo
Chapel of St. James	Triq it-12 ta'Mejju	35°52′43″N 14°25′32″E	02253		Upload Photo
Niche of St. Nicholas of Bari	Triq it-12 ta'Mejju (opposite Triq G. B. Debono)	35°52′30″N 14°26′02″E	02254	Niche of St. Nicholas of Bari	Upload Photo
Statue of St. Philip of Agira	Triq Santa Marija (on the right in front of the chapel)	35°52′36″N 14°26′21″E	02255	Statue of St. Philip of Agira	Upload Photo
Statue of the Assumption	Triq Santa Marija (on the left in front of the chapel)	35°52′36″N 14°26′21″E	02256	Statue of the Assumption	Upload Photo
Niche of the Immaculate Conception	76 Triq Santa Marija c/w Triq Santa Marija, Sqaq Nru. 1	35°52′33″N 14°26′17″E	02257	Niche of the Immaculate Conception	Upload Photo
Niche of St Joseph	63/64 Triq Santa Marija	35°52′35″N 14°26′19″E	02258	Niche of St Joseph	Upload Photo
Church of St. Mary	Triq Santa Marija	35°52′36″N 14°26′21″E	02259	Church of St. Mary	Upload Photo
Chapel of the Visitation	Triq Ta'Għaqba	35°52′01″N 14°26′59″E	02260	Chapel of the Visitation	Upload Photo
Niche of St. Gaetan	"Zadbet L-Andar" (opposite No. 28), Triq Ħali	35°52′10″N 14°26′21″E	02261	Niche of St. Gaetan	Upload Photo
Niche of St. Philip of Agira	34 Triq Ħali	35°52′14″N 14°26′22″E	02262	Niche of St. Philip of Agira	Upload Photo
Niche of St Roque	Triq il-Madonna	35°52′09″N 14°26′25″E	02263	Niche of St Roque	Upload Photo
Niche of St. Philip of Agira	Triq il-Madonna	35°52′09″N 14°26′24″E	02264	Niche of St. Philip of Agira	Upload Photo
Chapel of the Abandoned	Triq il-Madonna (Note: The same chapel is also listed as NICPMI Inv. No. 00007.)	35°52′09″N 14°26′24″E	02265	Chapel of the Abandoned	Upload Photo
Niche of the Madonna of Lourdes	52 Triq Sidtna ta'l-Anġli	35°52′14″N 14°26′25″E	02266	Niche of the Madonna of Lourdes	Upload Photo
Chapel of Our Lady of Angels	55 Triq Sidtna ta'l-Anġli	35°52′15″N 14°26′25″E	02267	Chapel of Our Lady of Angels	Upload Photo
Niche of the Immaculate Conception	Triq l-Anġlu (opposite Triq San Ġużepp)	35°52′15″N 14°26′27″E	02268	Niche of the Immaculate Conception	Upload Photo
Niche of Christ the Redeemer	Triq l-Anġlu	35°52′15″N 14°26′29″E	02269	Niche of Christ the Redeemer	Upload Photo
Niche of Ecce Homo	Triq il-Parroċċa c/w Triq Manoel	35°52′14″N 14°26′29″E	02270	Niche of Ecce Homo	Upload Photo
Niche of the Assumption	Triq il-Parroċċa c/w Triq Ebona	35°52′14″N 14°26′30″E	02271	Niche of the Assumption	Upload Photo
Niche of St. John the Baptist	8 Triq Ebona	35°52′13″N 14°26′31″E	02272	Niche of St. John the Baptist	Upload Photo
Niche of St Roque	Triq Ebona c/w Triq Ebona, Sqaq Nru. 3	35°52′11″N 14°26′32″E	02273	Niche of St Roque	Upload Photo
Niche of the Madonna of Mount Carmel	58 Triq tad-Dawl	35°52′09″N 14°26′33″E	02274	Niche of the Madonna of Mount Carmel	Upload Photo
Niche of St. Andrew	Triq tad-Dawl c/w Triq tad-Dawl, Sqaq Nru. 1	35°52′09″N 14°26′33″E	02275	Niche of St. Andrew	Upload Photo
Niche of St Roque	Triq tad-Dawl, Sqaq Nru. 1	35°52′10″N 14°26′33″E	02276	Niche of St Roque	Upload Photo
Niche of the Immaculate Conception	50 Triq tad-Dawl	35°52′08″N 14°26′34″E	02277	Niche of the Immaculate Conception	Upload Photo
Chapel of Our Lady of Light	Triq tad-Dawl	35°52′07″N 14°26′35″E	02278	Chapel of Our Lady of Light	Upload Photo
Relief of St. Helena	Triq il-Ħofra	35°52′09″N 14°26′40″E	02279	Relief of St. Helena	Upload Photo
Niche of the Madonna of Mount Carmel	"St. Carmel House", 43A Triq Vassalli	35°52′08″N 14°26′31″E	02280	Niche of the Madonna of Mount Carmel	Upload Photo
Niche of the Madonna of Mount Carmel	46 Triq Vassalli	35°52′09″N 14°26′31″E	02281	Niche of the Madonna of Mount Carmel	Upload Photo
Niche of St Joseph	Triq il-Parroċċa c/w 39 Triq San Ġużepp	35°52′12″N 14°26′29″E	02282	Niche of St Joseph	Upload Photo
Niche of St. Anthony of Padua	Triq Sidtna tal-Anġli c/w Triq Sidtna tal-Anġli, Sqaq Nru. 1	35°52′16″N 14°26′24″E	02283	Niche of St. Anthony of Padua	Upload Photo
Niche of the Immaculate Conception	"Candle House", 22 Triq Vilhena	35°52′16″N 14°26′28″E	02284	Niche of the Immaculate Conception	Upload Photo
Chapel of the Sacred Heart of Jesus	Triq L-Imdina	35°52′30″N 14°26′45″E	02285	Chapel of the Sacred Heart of Jesus	Upload Photo
Statue of the Sacred Heart of Jesus	Triq L-Imdina (in front of the church)	35°52′30″N 14°26′46″E	02286	Statue of the Sacred Heart of Jesus	Upload Photo
Niche of St Paul	Triq L-Imdina / Triq L-Isqof Caruana	35°52′39″N 14°26′31″E	02287	Niche of St Paul	Upload Photo
Niche of St Joseph	24 Triq tal-Grazzja	35°52′18″N 14°26′22″E	02288	Niche of St Joseph	Upload Photo
Niche of the Immaculate Conception	54 Triq Paris	35°52′27″N 14°26′23″E	02289	Niche of the Immaculate Conception	Upload Photo
Relief of a Cross	56 Triq Paris	35°52′28″N 14°26′23″E	02290	Relief of a Cross	Upload Photo
Niche of the Sacred Heart of Jesus	Wied Ta' c/w Triq is-Siġġiewi	35°52′03″N 14°26′44″E	02291	Niche of the Sacred Heart of Jesus	Upload Photo
Niche of the Madonna of Lourdes	Triq is-Siġġiewi		02292	Niche of the Madonna of Lourdes	Upload Photo
Niche of St Roque	Misraħ Ħal Dwieli / Misraħ Ħal Dwieli, Sqaq Nru. 2	35°52′03″N 14°26′25″E	02293	Niche of St Roque	Upload Photo
Niche of St Joseph	"Antonia House", 24 Misraħ Ħal Dwieli	35°52′04″N 14°26′26″E	02294	Niche of St Joseph	Upload Photo
Statue of the Madonna of the Rosary	Misraħ Ħal Dwieli (opposite Triq il-Madonna)	35°52′04″N 14°26′26″E	02295	Statue of the Madonna of the Rosary	Upload Photo
Chapel of the Madonna	Triq Ħal Mula	35°52′16″N 14°26′49″E	02296	Chapel of the Madonna	Upload Photo
Niche of St. Lawrence	Triq Achille Ferris	35°52′28″N 14°26′15″E	02297		Upload Photo
Niche of St Roque	Triq il-Buskett	35°52′10″N 14°25′44″E	02298		Upload Photo
Niche of St Joseph	"Blue Jay", 6 Triq Santa Marija	35°52′31″N 14°26′16″E	02299	Niche of St Joseph	Upload Photo
n/a	12-13 Triq De Rohan (Note: No name is provided in the official inventory.)	35°52′23″N 14°26′34″E	02567		Upload Photo
