= List of monuments in Marsaxlokk =

This is a list of monuments in Marsaxlokk, Malta, which are listed on the National Inventory of the Cultural Property of the Maltese Islands.

== List ==
Name of object	Location	Coordinates	ID	Photo	Upload
St Lucian Tower	Triq il-Qajjenza, Marsaxlokk Bay	35°49′49″N 14°32′36″E	00022	St Lucian Tower	Upload Photo
Tas-Silġ	Triq Xrobb L-Għaġin	35°50′45″N 14°33′07″E	00023	Tas-Silġ	Upload Photo
Villa Agius Catania	4 Triq il-Wilġa	35°50′28″N 14°32′49″E	01181	Villa Agius Catania	Upload Photo
Corner Premises	41 Triq San Ġużepp	35°50′30″N 14°32′40″E	01182	Corner Premises	Upload Photo
Casa Herbert (Casa Helbert)	65 Triq Santa Katerina	35°50′31″N 14°32′40″E	01183	Casa Herbert (?SystemKey=193747 Casa Helbert)	Upload Photo
Xrop l-Għagin entrenchment	Triq Xrobb L-Għaġin	35°50′28″N 14°34′15″E	01404	Xrop l-Għagin entrenchment	Upload Photo
Tombrell Battery	It-Tombrell, Delimara	35°49′44″N 14°33′48″E	01405		Upload Photo
Wilga Battery	Triq Ta' Wilġa	35°50′10″N 14°33′08″E	01406	Wilga Battery	Upload Photo
Vendôme Redoubt	Xatt is-Sajjieda / Triq il-Kavalleriżża	35°50′14″N 14°32′40″E	01407	Vendôme Redoubt	Upload Photo
Chapel of the Madonna of the Snows	Triq Delimara	35°50′39″N 14°33′09″E	01745	Chapel of the Madonna of the Snows	Upload Photo
Chapel of St Paul Shipwrecked	Triq Xrobb L-Għaġin / Munxar Hill	35°50′39″N 14°33′52″E	01746	Chapel of St Paul Shipwrecked	Upload Photo
Niche of St. Catherine	44 Xatt is-Sajjieda / Triq iż-Żejtun	35°50′28″N 14°32′42″E	01747	Niche of St. Catherine	Upload Photo
Statue of St Andrew	Pjazza l-Madonna ta' Pompei	35°50′29″N 14°32′42″E	01748	Statue of St Andrew	Upload Photo
Parish Church of the Madonna of Pompei	Pjazza l-Madonna ta' Pompei	35°50′30″N 14°32′40″E	01749	Parish Church of the Madonna of Pompei	Upload Photo
Niche of St Vincent Ferreri	Xatt is-Sajjieda / Triq San Pju V	35°50′19″N 14°32′37″E	01750	Niche of St Vincent Ferreri	Upload Photo
Niche of St Joseph	126 Xatt is-Sajjieda / Triq is-Salvatur	35°50′17″N 14°32′38″E	01751	Niche of St Joseph	Upload Photo
Niche of the Saviour	31 Triq is-Salvatur / Triq Sant' Antnin	35°50′18″N 14°32′35″E	01752	Niche of the Saviour	Upload Photo
Niche of the Madonna and Child	29 Triq is-Salvatur / Triq Sant' Antnin	35°50′17″N 14°32′36″E	01753	Niche of the Madonna and Child	Upload Photo
Niche of St. Anne	5-7 Xatt is-Sajjieda	35°50′29″N 14°32′47″E	01754	Niche of St. Anne	Upload Photo
Niche of St Joseph	65 Triq Santa Katerina / Triq San Ġużepp	35°50′31″N 14°32′40″E	01755	Niche of St Joseph	Upload Photo
Chapel of St Peter the Martyr	47 Triq iż-Żejtun	35°50′35″N 14°32′28″E	01756	Chapel of St Peter the Martyr	Upload Photo
Shrine of the Redeemer	Triq iż-Żejtun / Triq it-Torri	35°50′48″N 14°32′06″E	01757	Shrine of the Redeemer	Upload Photo
