= List of monuments in Safi, Malta =

This is a list of monuments in Safi, Malta, which are listed on the National Inventory of the Cultural Property of the Maltese Islands.

== List ==
Name of object	Location	Coordinates	ID	Photo	Upload
Ta' Ġawhar Tower	Triq Ta' Ġawhar	35°49′58″N 14°29′58″E	00021	Ta' Ġawhar Tower	Upload Photo
Il-Gnien Tal-Kmand	Triq Ta' Ġawhar	35°50′06″N 14°29′28″E	01209	Il-Gnien Tal-Kmand	Upload Photo
Parish Church of San Paul	Misraħ il-Knisja	35°50′02″N 14°29′01″E	01883	Parish Church of San Paul	Upload Photo
Statue of St. Paul	Misraħ il-Knisja	35°50′01″N 14°29′02″E	01884	Statue of St. Paul	Upload Photo
Chapel of Saint Mary	Triq Santa Marija	35°50′00″N 14°29′03″E	01885	Chapel of Saint Mary	Upload Photo
Niche of the Assumption	4 Triq Dun Ġużepp Caruana c/w Triq Santa Marija	35°50′00″N 14°29′02″E	01886	Niche of the Assumption	Upload Photo
Cross	Triq Santa Marija / Triq San Pawl	35°50′01″N 14°29′03″E	01887	Cross	Upload Photo
Statue of St. Paul	Triq San Pawl c/w Triq San Franġisk	35°50′01″N 14°29′04″E	01888	Statue of St. Paul	Upload Photo
Statue of the Immaculate Conception	48 Triq San Pawl	35°50′01″N 14°29′05″E	01889	Statue of the Immaculate Conception	Upload Photo
Niche of St Paul	80 Triq San Pawl	35°50′01″N 14°29′04″E	01890	Niche of St Paul	Upload Photo
Niche of the Madonna of Sorrows	"Id-Dar Ta Qniecel", 2 Triq San Pawl	35°50′07″N 14°29′10″E	01891	Niche of the Madonna of Sorrows	Upload Photo
Niche of St Joseph	19 Triq San Ġużepp c/w Misraħ San Ġużepp	35°50′00″N 14°29′06″E	01892	Niche of St Joseph	Upload Photo
Niche of Saint John the Evangelist	"Leroy", Triq San Ġorġ c/w "Salvinu Flats", Triq Triq Ħlantum	35°49′59″N 14°29′08″E	01893	Niche of Saint John the Evangelist	Upload Photo
Niche of the Immaculate Conception	Triq San Ġwann, Kirkop (not Safi)!	35°50′18″N 14°28′59″E	01894	Niche of the Immaculate Conception	Upload Photo
