= List of monuments in Fontana, Gozo =

This is a list of monuments in Fontana, Gozo, Malta, which are listed on the National Inventory of the Cultural Property of the Maltese Islands.

== List ==
Name of object	Location	Coordinates	ID	Photo	Upload
Wash-house	Triq tal-Għajn	36°02′14″N 14°14′07″E	00004	Wash-house	Upload Photo
Niche of St Anthony of Padua	"Carnation House", Triq L-Isptar San Ġiljan	36°02′22″N 14°14′18″E	00939	Niche of St Anthony of Padua	Upload Photo
Empty Niche (St Joseph)	43 Triq L-Isptar San Ġiljan (Note: A statue of St. Joseph has been installed in the niche since it was added to the inventory.)	36°02′20″N 14°14′15″E	00940	Empty Niche (St Joseph)	Upload Photo
Niche of St Anthony the Abbot	48 Triq L-Isptar San Ġiljan	36°02′20″N 14°14′15″E	00941	Niche of St Anthony the Abbot	Upload Photo
Parish Church of the Sacred Heart of Jesus	196 Triq tal-Għajn	36°02′21″N 14°14′12″E	00942	Parish Church of the Sacred Heart of Jesus	Upload Photo
Niche of Our Savior	111 Triq tal-Għajn	36°02′21″N 14°14′14″E	00943	Niche of Our Savior	Upload Photo
Niche of the Annunciation	211 Triq tal-Għajn	36°02′23″N 14°14′13″E	00944		Upload Photo
Niche of the Madonna of Sorrows	Triq tal-Għajn / Trejqet Bieb il-Għajn	36°02′25″N 14°14′14″E	00945		Upload Photo
Niche of the Madonna of Sorrows	61 Triq tal-Għajn	36°02′25″N 14°14′15″E	00946	Niche of the Madonna of Sorrows	Upload Photo
Empty Niche (St. Paul)	51 Triq tal-Għajn (Note: A statue of St. Paul has been reinstalled in the niche since it was added to the inventory.)	36°02′25″N 14°14′14″E	00947	Empty Niche (St. Paul)	Upload Photo
Niche of the Madonna of Lourdes	89 Triq il-Kappillan Ġiuseppe Hili	36°02′26″N 14°14′15″E	00948	Niche of the Madonna of Lourdes	Upload Photo
Niche of St Joseph	266 Triq tal-Għajn	36°02′27″N 14°14′14″E	00949		Upload Photo
Niche of the Madonna of Mount Carmel	Triq tal-Għajn	36°02′14″N 14°14′07″E	00950	Niche of the Madonna of Mount Carmel	Upload Photo
Empty Niche	"Dar Nazarett", Triq Santa Dminka	36°02′07″N 14°14′18″E	00951		Upload Photo
