= List of monuments in Xagħra =

This is a list of monuments in Xagħra, Gozo Malta, which are listed on the National Inventory of the Cultural Property of the Maltese Islands.

== List ==
Name of object	Location	Coordinates	ID	Photo	Upload
Ġgantija Temples	Triq L-Imqades	36°02′50″N 14°16′08″E	00001	Ġgantija Temples	Upload Photo
Ta' Kola Windmill	Triq Marija Bambina	36°02′59″N 14°16′01″E	00005	Ta' Kola Windmill	Upload Photo
Xagħra Stone Circle	Triq ta' Qaċċa	36°02′47″N 14°15′54″E	00026	Xagħra Stone Circle	Upload Photo
Nuffara Bronze Age Settlement	Daħla tan-Nuffara	36°02′30″N 14°16′25″E	00030	Nuffara Bronze Age Settlement	Upload Photo
Għeżju Cave	Vjal it-8 ta'Settembru	36°02′51″N 14°15′57″E	00044	Għeżju Cave	Upload Photo
Statue Ecce Homo	81 Pjazza il-Vittorja c/w Triq 28 ta'April 1688	36°02′59″N 14°15′51″E	01093	Statue Ecce Homo	Upload Photo
Niche of St. Rita	1 Triq 28 ta'April 1688	36°02′59″N 14°15′51″E	01094	Niche of St. Rita	Upload Photo
Niche of the young Madonna	61 Triq il-Knisja	36°02′59″N 14°15′49″E	01095	Niche of the young Madonna	Upload Photo
Niche of the Madonna of Lourdes	39 Triq il-Knisja	36°02′58″N 14°15′44″E	01096	Niche of the Madonna of Lourdes	Upload Photo
Niche of the Madonna of Sorrows	"Razzett ta'Marija", 1 Triq Spiera	36°02′56″N 14°15′39″E	01097	Niche of the Madonna of Sorrows	Upload Photo
Niche of St. Anthony of Padua	"Dar Sant Antnin", 20 Triq il-Knisja	36°02′56″N 14°15′39″E	01098	Niche of St. Anthony of Padua	Upload Photo
Niche of the Sacred Heart of Jesus	173 Triq Marsalforn	36°03′13″N 14°16′08″E	01099	Niche of the Sacred Heart of Jesus	Upload Photo
Niche of the Assumption of the Madonna	30 Triq Marsalforn	36°03′23″N 14°16′06″E	01100	Niche of the Assumption of the Madonna	Upload Photo
Niche of St. Rita	69 Triq Marsalforn	36°03′39″N 14°16′00″E	01101	Niche of St. Rita	Upload Photo
Niche of St Paul	90 Triq Marsalforn	36°03′51″N 14°15′57″E	01102	Niche of St Paul	Upload Photo
Niche of St Joseph	18a-19 Triq Jannar	36°03′05″N 14°15′53″E	01103	Niche of St Joseph	Upload Photo
Niche of St. Anthony of Padua	"St. Anthony", 45 Triq Jannar	36°03′10″N 14°15′48″E	01104	Niche of St. Anthony of Padua	Upload Photo
Niche of St Michael	"Xerri's Grotto", Triq l-Għar ta' Xerri	36°03′04″N 14°15′41″E	01105	Niche of St Michael	Upload Photo
Niche of the Madonna of Sorrows	128 Triq ta'Bullara	36°03′03″N 14°15′45″E	01106	Niche of the Madonna of Sorrows	Upload Photo
Parish Church of the nativity of the Madonna	Pjazza il-Vittorja	36°03′01″N 14°15′54″E	01107	Parish Church of the nativity of the Madonna	Upload Photo
Niche of the Madonna of Mercy	Triq il-Knisja (near Xagħra Cemetery)	36°02′49″N 14°15′16″E	01108	Niche of the Madonna of Mercy	Upload Photo
Niche of the Madonna of Mount Carmel	"Ta' Pawl", 107 Triq Ġnien Xibla	36°03′08″N 14°16′18″E	01109	Niche of the Madonna of Mount Carmel	Upload Photo
Niche of the Madonna of Lourdes	Sydney House, 109 Triq Ġnien Xibla	36°03′08″N 14°16′18″E	01110	Niche of the Madonna of Lourdes	Upload Photo
Statue of the Madonna of Hope	Ramla Bay Beach	36°03′41″N 14°17′03″E	01111	Statue of the Madonna of Hope	Upload Photo
Church of Christ Nazarene	Triq Ġnien Xibla	36°03′03″N 14°16′28″E	01112	Church of Christ Nazarene	Upload Photo
Niche of St. Augustine (Maria Gaudorium)	"Maria Gaudorium House", 38 Triq Gajdoru (opposite Triq il-Patrijiet Agostinjani)	36°03′20″N 14°16′30″E	01113	Niche of St. Augustine (Maria Gaudorium)	Upload Photo
Niche of St Joseph	163 Triq 28 ta'April 1688	36°02′58″N 14°15′49″E	01114	Niche of St Joseph	Upload Photo
Niche of the Sacred Heart of Jesus	38 Triq 28 ta'April 1688	36°02′52″N 14°15′47″E	01115	Niche of the Sacred Heart of Jesus	Upload Photo
Empty Niche	113 Pjazza Sant'Anton	36°02′47″N 14°15′44″E	01116	Empty Niche	Upload Photo
Church of St. Anthony the Abbot	Triq Sant'Anton	36°02′45″N 14°15′43″E	01117	Church of St. Anthony the Abbot	Upload Photo
Statue of the Sacred Heart of Jesus	1 Triq Sruġ	36°02′52″N 14°15′20″E	01118	Statue of the Sacred Heart of Jesus	Upload Photo
Niche of St Joseph	1 Triq Għonqa	36°03′09″N 14°16′19″E	01119	Niche of St Joseph	Upload Photo
Niche of the Sacred Heart of Jesus	54 Triq Għajn Qamar	36°03′20″N 14°16′19″E	01120	Niche of the Sacred Heart of Jesus	Upload Photo
Relief of the Holy Family	63 Triq it-Tigrija	36°03′13″N 14°16′11″E	01121	Relief of the Holy Family	Upload Photo
Niche of the Madonna of Mount Carmel	16/17 Triq Mannar	36°02′59″N 14°16′28″E	01122	Niche of the Madonna of Mount Carmel	Upload Photo
Niche of St Joseph	72 Triq San Ġorġ (Note: This address is stated at NICPMI however Triq San Ġorġ doesn't exist in Xagħra. Real location of the niche is unknown.)		01123		Upload Photo
Niche of the Madonna of Lourdes	Triq tal-Qaċċa (opposite No. 33)	36°02′44″N 14°15′54″E	01124	Niche of the Madonna of Lourdes	Upload Photo
Remains of Ramla Entrenchment	Ramla Bay	36°03′44″N 14°17′02″E	01703		Upload Photo
