= List of monuments in Xewkija =

This is a list of monuments in Xewkija, Gozo Malta, which are listed on the National Inventory of the Cultural Property of the Maltese Islands.

== List ==
Name of object	Location	Coordinates	ID	Photo	Upload
Niche of St Joseph	Pjazza San Ġwann Battista c/w 2 Triq San Bert	36°01′56″N 14°15′40″E	01044	Niche of St Joseph	Upload Photo
Parish Church of St. John the Baptist	Pjazza San Ġwann Battista	36°01′54″N 14°15′40″E	01045	Parish Church of St. John the Baptist	Upload Photo
Niche of St. Catherine	Triq Santa Katarina c/w Triq Tal-Ħamrija	36°02′02″N 14°15′30″E	01046	Niche of St. Catherine	Upload Photo
Niche of St. John the Baptist	Triq Santa Katarina (opposite Triq San Ġwann Battista)	36°02′01″N 14°15′30″E	01047	Niche of St. John the Baptist	Upload Photo
Niche of St. John the Baptist	"Joannes", 71 Triq Hamsin	36°01′56″N 14°15′21″E	01048	Niche of St. John the Baptist	Upload Photo
Niche of the Immaculate Conception	121 Triq San Ġwann Battista	36°02′01″N 14°15′27″E	01049	Niche of the Immaculate Conception	Upload Photo
Empty Niche	Triq Sansun / Triq Mikelanġ Sapiano	36°02′01″N 14°15′10″E	01050	Empty Niche	Upload Photo
Niche of St. John the Baptist	Triq San Ġwann Battista c/w Triq Tal-Ħamrija	36°02′04″N 14°15′09″E	01051	Niche of St. John the Baptist	Upload Photo
Niche of St. John the Baptist	16 Triq il-Mitħna	36°02′07″N 14°15′36″E	01052	Niche of St. John the Baptist	Upload Photo
Niche of the Madonna of Sorrows	3 Triq il-Mitħna	36°02′09″N 14°15′37″E	01053	Niche of the Madonna of Sorrows	Upload Photo
Niche of the Madonna of Purgatory	2 Triq il-Mitħna (windmill) c/w Triq L-Imġarr	36°02′10″N 14°15′37″E	01054	Niche of the Madonna of Purgatory	Upload Photo
Niche of St. Publius	"Sacred Heart", 2 Triq San Pupulju c/w Triq il-Knisja	36°01′57″N 14°15′34″E	01055	Niche of St. Publius	Upload Photo
Niche of St. John the Baptist	Trejqet L-Għammiedi c/w Triq il-Knisja	36°01′57″N 14°15′33″E	01056	Niche of St. John the Baptist	Upload Photo
Church of the Madonna of Mercy	Triq L-Imġarr c/w Triq San Bert	36°01′57″N 14°16′05″E	01057	Church of the Madonna of Mercy	Upload Photo
Niche of the Madonna of Lourdes	Triq San Bert (side wall of the church)	36°01′57″N 14°16′05″E	01058	Niche of the Madonna of Lourdes	Upload Photo
Niche of St. Publius	13 Triq San Bert	36°01′56″N 14°15′42″E	01059	Niche of St. Publius	Upload Photo
Niche of St. John the Baptist	27 Triq L-Indipendenza (opposite Triq Tal-Ħamrija)	36°02′04″N 14°15′37″E	01060	Niche of St. John the Baptist	Upload Photo
Niche of the Madonna of Providence	Triq il-Madonna Tar-Rummiena	36°02′18″N 14°15′52″E	01061	Niche of the Madonna of Providence	Upload Photo
Niche of St Joseph	22 Triq L-Indipendenza	36°02′02″N 14°15′38″E	01062	Niche of St Joseph	Upload Photo
Chapel Madonna of Mount Carmel	Triq Ta' Hamet (Note: NICPMI wrongly places the church in Xagħra.)	36°02′26″N 14°15′57″E	01092	Chapel Madonna of Mount Carmel	Upload Photo
