= List of monuments in Birżebbuġa =

This is a list of monuments in Birżebbuġa, Malta, which are listed on the National Inventory of the Cultural Property of the Maltese Islands., as well as Grade 1 scheduled properties from the Malta Scheduled Property Register maintained by Malta's Planning Authority. The latter are denoted by an ID beginning with the letters MSPR.

== List ==
Name of object	Location	Coordinates	ID	Photo	Upload
Għar Dalam Cave	Triq Għar Dalam	35°50′10″N 14°31′39″E	00029	Għar Dalam Cave	Upload Photo
Palm Lodge, Pegasus and Kalimera	Ix-Xatt ta' San Ġorġ	35°49′57″N 14°31′49″E	01166	Palm Lodge, Pegasus and Kalimera	Upload Photo
Ferretti Battery	Triq il-Qajjenza	35°49′57″N 14°32′02″E	01408	Ferretti Battery	Upload Photo
St George Redoubt	Triq Għar Dalam / Triq Birzebbuga	35°49′52″N 14°31′50″E	01409	St George Redoubt	Upload Photo
Għżira Battery	Triq il-Gżira / Dawret il-Qalb Mqaddsa	35°49′36″N 14°31′58″E	01410	Għżira Battery	Upload Photo
Birżebbuġa Entrenchment	Triq San Patrizju	35°49′14″N 14°31′48″E	01411	Birżebbuġa Entrenchment	Upload Photo
Birzebbuga Fougasse	Triq Alfonso Maria Galea	35°49′51″N 14°31′49″E	01436		Upload Photo
Church of St George	Triq Alfonso Maria Galea	35°49′52″N 14°31′49″E	01704	Church of St George	Upload Photo
Shrine of the Madonna of Lourdes	Triq iż-Żejtun	35°49′56″N 14°31′45″E	01705	Shrine of the Madonna of Lourdes	Upload Photo
Chapel of the Immaculate Conception	Misraħ P.P. Saydon / Triq L-Immakulata Kunċizzjoni	35°48′47″N 14°31′28″E	01706	Chapel of the Immaculate Conception	Upload Photo
Niche of St Joseph	Misraħ P.P. Saydon / 19 Triq L-Immakulata Kunċizzjoni	35°48′46″N 14°31′30″E	01707	Niche of St Joseph	Upload Photo
Niche of the Immaculate Conception	47 Triq L-Immakulata Kunċizzjoni	35°48′47″N 14°31′30″E	01708	Niche of the Immaculate Conception	Upload Photo
Niche of the Madonna of Mount Carmel	12 Triq L-Immakulata Kunċizzjoni	35°48′50″N 14°31′39″E	01709	Niche of the Madonna of Mount Carmel	Upload Photo
Chapel of the Madonna help of Christians	Triq iż-Żejtun	35°49′58″N 14°31′50″E	01710	Chapel of the Madonna help of Christians	Upload Photo
Statue of Madonna and Child	Triq iż-Żejtun	35°49′58″N 14°31′50″E	01711	Statue of Madonna and Child	Upload Photo
Chapel of the Pieta	Triq il-Knisja	35°49′36″N 14°31′45″E	01712	Chapel of the Pieta	Upload Photo
Church of the Holy Family	49 Triq iż-Żurrieq	35°49′32″N 14°31′39″E	01713	Church of the Holy Family	Upload Photo
Parish Church of St Peter in Chains	Misraħ il-Knisja	35°49′37″N 14°31′38″E	01714	Parish Church of St Peter in Chains	Upload Photo
Niche of the Madonna of Mount Carmel	Misraħ is-Summit / Triq San Filippu	35°49′24″N 14°31′43″E	01715	Niche of the Madonna of Mount Carmel	Upload Photo
Niche of the Madonna of the Rosary	153 Triq Birżebbuġa	35°49′41″N 14°31′40″E	01716	Niche of the Madonna of the Rosary	Upload Photo
Niche of the Madonna of Fatima	102 Triq iż-Żurrieq	35°49′29″N 14°31′34″E	01717	Niche of the Madonna of Fatima	Upload Photo
Niche of the Madonna of Fatima	Triq tal-Ġebel, Ħal Far	35°49′18″N 14°30′50″E	01718	Niche of the Madonna of Fatima	Upload Photo
Niche of the Immaculate Conception	Triq tal-Ġebel, Ħal Far	35°49′15″N 14°30′38″E	01719	Niche of the Immaculate Conception	Upload Photo
Niche of the Madonna of Fatima (destroyed)	Triq San Patrizju	35°49′16″N 14°31′46″E	01720		Upload Photo
Niche of the Pieta	32 Triq il-Brolli	35°49′41″N 14°31′37″E	01721	Niche of the Pieta	Upload Photo
Casa Ippolito	Ir-Razzett ta' Pultu		MSPR0008		Upload Photo
Tower and Grounds	Triq il-Kartaġiniżi		MSPR0009		Upload Photo
Chapel of St Joseph	Triq iż-Żejtun		MSPR0010		Upload Photo
Church of the Immaculate Conception	Misraħ P.P Saydon		MSPR0011		Upload Photo
Il-Fortizza Ta' Bengħisa	Triq il-Fortizza ta' Bengħisa		MSPR0012		Upload Photo
End of Cold War Memorial	Dawret il-Qalb Imqaddsa		MSPR0013		Upload Photo
Inland Tower	Wied Dalam		MSPR0014		Upload Photo
St. George Church	Triq Birzebbuga		MSPR0015		Upload Photo
Parish Church of St Peter in Chains	Triq il-Kurat Fenech		MSPR0016		Upload Photo
Domus Curialis	Triq il-Kurat Fenech/Sant' Anglu		MSPR0017		Upload Photo
Church of the Holy Family	Triq iż-Żurrieq		MSPR0018		Upload Photo
Old Parish Church	Triq il-Knisja		MSPR0019		Upload Photo
Gżira Battery	Triq il-Gżira		MSPR0020		Upload Photo
San Ġorġ Redoubt	Triq Birzebbuga		MSPR0021		Upload Photo
Birzebbugia Entrenchment	Triq San Patrizju		MSPR0022		Upload Photo
Ferretti Battery	Triq il-Qajjenza		MSPR0023		Upload Photo
