= List of monuments in Għaxaq =

This is a list of monuments in Għaxaq, Malta, which are listed on the National Inventory of the Cultural Property of the Maltese Islands.

== List ==
Name of object	Location	Coordinates	ID	Photo	Upload
Chapel of St Lucy	Triq Ħal Tarxien	35°51′27″N 14°30′43″E	02004	Chapel of St Lucy	Upload Photo
Niche of the Madonna of Mount Carmel	Triq Ħal Għaxaq / Triq Ġużeppi D’Arena	35°51′00″N 14°30′42″E	02005	Niche of the Madonna of Mount Carmel	Upload Photo
Niche of the Crucifix	57, Triq il-Gudja	35°50′59″N 14°30′48″E	02006	Niche of the Crucifix	Upload Photo
Niche of the Baptism of Christ (destroyed)	86, Triq il-Gudja	35°50′57″N 14°30′53″E	02007	Niche of the Baptism of Christ(destroyed)	Upload Photo
Statue of St Roque	Pjazza Santu Rokku	35°50′58″N 14°30′56″E	02008	Statue of St Roque	Upload Photo
Niche of the Assumption			02009	Niche of the Assumption	Upload Photo
Chapel of St Philip Neri	Misraħ San Filippu	35°50′56″N 14°30′56″E	02010	Chapel of St Philip Neri	Upload Photo
Niche of the Assumption	Triq Dun Ġorġ Preca / Triq Mariano Gerada	35°50′55″N 14°30′57″E	02011	Niche of the Assumption	Upload Photo
Niche of St Joseph	Triq Dun Ġorġ Preca / Triq San Pawl	35°50′54″N 14°30′57″E	02012	Niche of St Joseph	Upload Photo
Niche of the Madonna of Lourdes	38-39, Triq San Bastjan	35°50′56″N 14°31′00″E	02013	Niche of the Madonna of Lourdes	Upload Photo
Niche of St Joseph	"Id-Dar ta’ Massi", 25, Triq Santa Marija	35°50′58″N 14°31′00″E	02014	Niche of St Joseph	Upload Photo
Niche of St. Andrew	"Id-Dar ta’ Massi", 25, Triq Santa Marija	35°50′58″N 14°31′00″E	02015	Niche of St. Andrew	Upload Photo
Niche of the Assumption	"Id-Dar ta’ Massi", 25, Triq Santa Marija	35°50′58″N 14°31′00″E	02016	Niche of the Assumption	Upload Photo
Niche of the Crucifix	"Dar il-Bebbux", 23, Triq Santa Marija	35°50′58″N 14°31′00″E	02017	Niche of the Crucifix	Upload Photo
Niche of the Madonna of Lourdes (statue lost)	"Sacred Heart House", 7, Triq Dar il-Bebbux	35°50′59″N 14°31′00″E	02018	Niche of the Madonna of Lourdes (statue lost)	Upload Photo
Niche of Christ the King	75, Triq Santa Marija	35°50′58″N 14°31′03″E	02019	Niche of Christ the King	Upload Photo
Parish Church of the Assumption	Pjazza Santa Marija	35°50′57″N 14°31′03″E	02020	Parish Church of the Assumption	Upload Photo
Statue of the Assumption	Pjazza Santa Marija	35°50′57″N 14°31′05″E	02021	Statue of the Assumption	Upload Photo
Niche of the Assumption	24, Triq Santa Marija	35°50′58″N 14°31′10″E	02022	Niche of the Assumption	Upload Photo
Niche of St Joseph	Triq Santa Marija / Triq 15 ta’ Frar 1970	35°50′58″N 14°31′11″E	02023	Niche of St Joseph	Upload Photo
Niche of the Addolorata	"Casa Pace", 142, Triq Santa Marija	35°50′58″N 14°31′16″E	02024	Niche of the Addolorata	Upload Photo
Niche of the Madonna with Christ	245, Triq Santa Marija	35°50′59″N 14°31′19″E	02025	Niche of the Madonna with Christ	Upload Photo
Niche of the Crucifix	Triq Santa Marija / Triq iż-Żejtun / Triq Birżebbuġa	35°50′58″N 14°31′22″E	02026	Niche of the Crucifix	Upload Photo
Niche of St Joseph	16, San Ġużepp	35°50′56″N 14°31′03″E	02027	Niche of St Joseph	Upload Photo
Niche of St Joseph	Triq Santa Marija / Triq Santu Rokku	35°50′57″N 14°30′58″E	02028	Niche of St Joseph	Upload Photo
Niche of the Assumption	"Symphony", Triq Santa Marija / Triq Santu Rokku	35°50′57″N 14°30′57″E	02029	Niche of the Assumption	Upload Photo
Niche of the Madonna with Christ	Triq il-Belt Valletta / Triq iċ-Ċimiterju	35°51′06″N 14°30′57″E	02030	Niche of the Madonna with Christ	Upload Photo
Chapel of Christ Redeemer	Triq il-Belt Valletta	35°51′16″N 14°30′58″E	02031	Chapel of Christ Redeemer	Upload Photo
Dar tal-Bebbux / Dar Ta’ Massi	24–25, Old Trafford, Triq Santa Marija k/m Triq San Karlu	35°50′58″N 14°31′00″E	02600	Dar tal-Bebbux / Dar Ta’ Massi	Upload Photo
