= List of monuments in Ħamrun =

This is a list of monuments in Ħamrun, Malta, which are listed on the National Inventory of the Cultural Property of the Maltese Islands.

== List ==
Name of object	Location	Coordinates	ID	Photo	Upload
Round Water Tower	89, Triq San Ġejtanu	35°53′10″N 14°29′09″E	00008	Round Water Tower	Upload Photo
