= List of monuments in Mosta =

This is a list of monuments in Mosta, Malta, which are listed on the National Inventory of the Cultural Property of the Maltese Islands.

== List ==
Name of object	Location	Coordinates	ID	Photo	Upload
Tal-Bidni Roman Villa	Bidnija	35°55′33″N 14°24′23″E	00013		Upload Photo
Villa Gollcher	12 Triq it-Tabib Chectcuti k/m 7 Triq Salvu Dimech u 57–59 Triq il-Kostituzzjoni, Mosta	35°54′34″N 14°25′27″E	02565	more files	Upload Photo
Villa Grech Mifsud	198–200 Triq il-Kbira, Sqaq Grech Mifsud u Triq Grognet, Mosta	35°54′32″N 14°25′31″E	02566		Upload Photo
