= List of monuments in Senglea =

This is a list of monuments in Senglea, Malta, which are listed on the National Inventory of the Cultural Property of the Maltese Islands.

== List ==
Name of object	Location	Coordinates	ID	Photo	Upload
Niche the Nativity of the Madonna	Mina ta' Sant' Anna	35°53′06″N 14°31′10″E	00682	Niche the Nativity of the Madonna	Upload Photo
Parish Church of the Nativity of the Madonna	Misraħ il-Papa Benedittu XV	35°53′08″N 14°31′05″E	00683	Parish Church of the Nativity of the Madonna	Upload Photo
Niche of the Madonna of Mount Carmel	Triq L-Oratorju	35°53′08″N 14°31′04″E	00684	Niche of the Madonna of Mount Carmel	Upload Photo
Niche of St Paul	29 Triq il-Vitorja c/w Triq San Pietru u San Pawl	35°53′12″N 14°31′04″E	00685	Niche of St Paul	Upload Photo
Niche of St. Peter	Triq il-Vitorja c/w Triq San Pietru u San Pawl	35°53′12″N 14°31′05″E	00686	Niche of St. Peter	Upload Photo
Niche of St. Paul	28 Triq il-Vitorja c/w Triq San Pietru u San Pawl	35°53′12″N 14°31′04″E	00687	Niche of St. Paul	Upload Photo
Statue of St Joseph	Triq il-Mina tax-Xatt c/w 265 Triq iż-Żewġ Mini	35°53′14″N 14°31′04″E	00688	Statue of St Joseph	Upload Photo
Niche of St Paul	Triq San Ġiljan c/w Triq iż-Żewġ Mini	35°53′15″N 14°31′03″E	00689	Niche of St Paul	Upload Photo
Church of St. Julian	Triq San Ġiljan c/w Triq iż-Żewġ Mini	35°53′15″N 14°31′04″E	00690	Church of St. Julian	Upload Photo
Statue of the Madonna and Child	Misraħ L-Erbgħa ta'Settembru	35°53′16″N 14°31′01″E	00691	Statue of the Madonna and Child	Upload Photo
Statue of St. Michael the Archangel	Triq San Mikiel c/w Triq is-Sur	35°53′16″N 14°30′57″E	00692	Statue of St. Michael the Archangel	Upload Photo
Niche of the Immaculate Conception	Triq il-Ponta c/w Triq id-Duluri	35°53′18″N 14°30′57″E	00693	Niche of the Immaculate Conception	Upload Photo
Niche of the Madonna of Sorrows	25 Triq id-Duluri	35°53′17″N 14°30′57″E	00694	Niche of the Madonna of Sorrows	Upload Photo
Niche of the Madonna of Sorrows	Triq il-Vitorja c/w Triq id-Duluri	35°53′19″N 14°30′59″E	00695	Niche of the Madonna of Sorrows	Upload Photo
Niche of the Sacred Heart of Jesus	Triq Sant'Anġlu	35°53′20″N 14°30′56″E	00696	Niche of the Sacred Heart of Jesus	Upload Photo
Niche of the Madonna of Sorrows	Triq il-Ponta c/w Triq San Franġisk	35°53′21″N 14°30′55″E	00697	Niche of the Madonna of Sorrows	Upload Photo
Niche of St. Philip Neri	Pjazza Francesco Zahra	35°53′22″N 14°30′56″E	00698	Niche of St. Philip Neri	Upload Photo
Niche of the Madonna of Lourdes	Triq iż-Żewġ Mini c/w Triq il-Grigal	35°53′24″N 14°30′55″E	00699	Niche of the Madonna of Lourdes	Upload Photo
Church of the Madonna of Safe Havens	Triq iż-Żewġ Mini c/w Triq il-Grigal	35°53′23″N 14°30′55″E	00700	Church of the Madonna of Safe Havens	Upload Photo
Niche of the Madonna of Safe Havens	Triq is-Sirena	35°53′26″N 14°30′53″E	00701	Niche of the Madonna of Safe Havens	Upload Photo
Niche of the Crucified Christ	Il-Ponta ta' L-Isla	35°53′27″N 14°30′50″E	00702	Niche of the Crucified Christ	Upload Photo
Niche of the Madonna of Lourdes	Xatt Juan B. Azopardo	35°53′24″N 14°30′59″E	00703	Niche of the Madonna of Lourdes	Upload Photo
Niche of the Madonna of Lourdes	97 Triq San Ġużepp	35°53′13″N 14°31′07″E	00704	Niche of the Madonna of Lourdes	Upload Photo
Senglea	Senglea	35°53′16″N 14°31′02″E	01496	Senglea	Upload Photo
St Michael Bastion	Triq il-Mons. Penzavecchia	35°53′04″N 14°31′08″E	01497	St Michael Bastion	Upload Photo
St Michael Cavalier	Bastion św. Michała	35°53′05″N 14°31′08″E	01498	St Michael Cavalier	Upload Photo
Casemated rampart with Main Gate	Misraħ Ġorġ Mitrovich	35°53′06″N 14°31′10″E	01499	Casemated rampart with Main Gate	Upload Photo
The Spur	Il-Ponta ta' L-Isla	35°53′26″N 14°30′51″E	01500	The Spur	Upload Photo
Grunenburg's sea-level battery	Il-Ponta ta' L-Isla	35°53′27″N 14°30′52″E	01501	Grunenburg's sea-level battery	Upload Photo
Enceinte along Corradino side	Triq is-Sur (from The Spur to Saint Michael Bastion)	35°53′13″N 14°30′59″E	01502	Enceinte along Corradino side	Upload Photo
Platform to the rear of The Spur	Il-Ponta ta' L-Isla / Triq is-Sirena	35°53′26″N 14°30′53″E	01503		Upload Photo
Casemated rampart on left extremity of landfront (il- Maċina)	Il-Maċina	35°53′07″N 14°31′11″E	01504	Casemated rampart on left extremity of landfront (il- Maċina)	Upload Photo
St Anne Gate	Misraħ Ġorġ Mitrovich	35°53′05″N 14°31′10″E	01505	St Anne Gate	Upload Photo
Curtain near St Michael Bastion		35°53′05″N 14°31′06″E	01506	Curtain near St Michael Bastion	Upload Photo
