= List of monuments in Cospicua =

This is a list of monuments in Cospicua, Malta, which are listed on the National Inventory of the Cultural Property of the Maltese Islands.

== List ==
Name of object	Location	Coordinates	ID	Photo	Upload
Chapel of St. John Elimonsinier	Triq San Ġwann t'Għuxa	35°52′41″N 14°31′08″E	00659	Chapel of St. John Elimonsinier	Upload Photo
Painting of St. John the Baptist	St. Helena Gate, Triq Santa Liena	35°52′46″N 14°31′15″E	00660	Painting of St. John the Baptist	Upload Photo
Statue of the Immaculate Conception	Triq il-Kunċiżżjoni	35°52′48″N 14°31′11″E	00661	Statue of the Immaculate Conception	Upload Photo
Church of St. Paul	Triq San Franġisk / Triq San Pawl	35°52′53″N 14°31′09″E	00662	Church of St. Paul	Upload Photo
Niche of the Madonna of Lourdes	Triq San Franġisk / Fuq San Pawl	35°52′53″N 14°31′07″E	00663	Niche of the Madonna of Lourdes	Upload Photo
Niche of the Crucified Christ	Triq Wiġi Rosario / Fuq San Pawl	35°52′52″N 14°31′07″E	00664	Niche of the Crucified Christ	Upload Photo
Niche of St Joseph	Triq Feliċ / Sqaq Feliċ	35°52′53″N 14°31′06″E	00665	Niche of St Joseph	Upload Photo
Niche of the Assumption	Il-Fortini ta' Feliċ / Bieb Bormla	35°52′55″N 14°31′06″E	00666	Niche of the Assumption	Upload Photo
Niche of the Immaculate Conception	135 Triq San Pawl	35°52′58″N 14°31′09″E	00667	Niche of the Immaculate Conception	Upload Photo
Church of the Immaculate Conception	Triq L-Inkurunazzjoni	35°52′47″N 14°31′14″E	00668		Upload Photo
Parish Church of the Immaculate Conception	Triq il-Pellegrinaġġ	35°52′52″N 14°31′15″E	00669	Parish Church of the Immaculate Conception	Upload Photo
Statue of the Immaculate Conception	Triq il-Pellegrinaġġ	35°52′53″N 14°31′14″E	00670	Statue of the Immaculate Conception	Upload Photo
Oratory of the Crucifix	Triq il-Oratorju	35°52′53″N 14°31′15″E	00671	Oratory of the Crucifix	Upload Photo
Niche of the Madonna of Sorrows	Triq il-Oratorju	35°52′54″N 14°31′16″E	00672	Niche of the Madonna of Sorrows	Upload Photo
Statue of St. Elias	Wesgħa ta' Santa Tereza	35°53′03″N 14°31′17″E	00673	Statue of St. Elias	Upload Photo
Church of St. Theresa of Avila	Wesgħa ta' Santa Tereza	35°53′03″N 14°31′16″E	00674	Church of St. Theresa of Avila	Upload Photo
Niche of the Immaculate Conception	Triq Santa Tereza	35°53′02″N 14°31′16″E	00675	Niche of the Immaculate Conception	Upload Photo
Church of St. Joseph	Triq San Ġorġ	35°53′03″N 14°31′23″E	00676	Church of St. Joseph	Upload Photo
Church of St. Margaret	Misraħ Bormla	35°53′01″N 14°31′26″E	00677	Church of St. Margaret	Upload Photo
Statue of the Immaculate Conception	6 Triq id-Dejqa	35°53′00″N 14°31′27″E	00678	Statue of the Immaculate Conception	Upload Photo
Niche of St Michael	Triq Matty Grima / Triq Santa Margerita	35°52′58″N 14°31′26″E	00679	Niche of St Michael	Upload Photo
Empty Niche (Immaculate Conception)	Triq Oratorju / Triq Santa Margerita	35°52′53″N 14°31′26″E	00680	Empty Niche (Immaculate Conception)	Upload Photo
Empty Niche (Immaculate Conception)	Triq Matty Grima (covered passage)	35°52′58″N 14°31′20″E	00681	Empty Niche (Immaculate Conception)	Upload Photo
Sta. Margherita Lines		35°52′50″N 14°31′22″E	01526	Sta. Margherita Lines	Upload Photo
St Helen Bastion - St Margherita Lines	Triq Alessandra	35°52′44″N 14°31′24″E	01527	St Helen Bastion - St Margherita Lines	Upload Photo
St Helen Curtain - St Margherita Lines	Triq Santa Liena	35°52′45″N 14°31′14″E	01528	St Helen Curtain - St Margherita Lines	Upload Photo
Sta Margherita Bastion - St Margherita Lines	Triq il-Giblew tal-Fidda	35°52′52″N 14°31′31″E	01529	Sta Margherita Bastion - St Margherita Lines	Upload Photo
Firenzuola Bastion - St Margherita Lines	Triq il-Giblew tal-Fidda	35°53′00″N 14°31′31″E	01530	Firenzuola Bastion - St Margherita Lines	Upload Photo
Stepped wing - St Margherita Lines	Triq il-Giblew tal-Fidda	35°53′04″N 14°31′26″E	01531	Stepped wing - St Margherita Lines	Upload Photo
St John Almoner Bastion - St Margherita Lines	Triq San Ġwann	35°52′44″N 14°31′08″E	01532	St John Almoner Bastion - St Margherita Lines	Upload Photo
Verdala Curtain - St Margherita Lines	Fuq Verdala	35°52′51″N 14°31′27″E	01533	Verdala Curtain - St Margherita Lines	Upload Photo
Short Curtain Wall - St Margherita Lines	Triq il-Giblew tal-Fidda	35°53′02″N 14°31′28″E	01534	Short Curtain Wall - St Margherita Lines	Upload Photo
Curtain wall with Secondary Gate - St Margherita Lines	Triq il-Giblew tal-Fidda	35°52′56″N 14°31′29″E	01535		Upload Photo
Ditch - St Margherita Lines		35°52′46″N 14°31′25″E	01536	Ditch - St Margherita Lines	Upload Photo
Covertway - St Margherita Lines	Triq il-Giblew tal-Fidda	35°52′59″N 14°31′32″E	01537	Covertway - St Margherita Lines	Upload Photo
Curtain wall between St John Almoner Bastion and St Francis Bastion - St Margherita Lines	Triq San Ġwann t'Għuxa	35°52′47″N 14°31′06″E	01538	Curtain wall between St John Almoner Bastion and St Francis Bastion - St Margherita Lines	Upload Photo
Verdala Gate - St Margherita Lines	Bieb Verdala	35°52′51″N 14°31′27″E	01539	Verdala Gate - St Margherita Lines	Upload Photo
Fort Verdala	Fuq Verdala	35°52′52″N 14°31′27″E	01540	Fort Verdala	Upload Photo
St Helen Gate - Sta Margherita Lines	Triq Santa Liena	35°52′45″N 14°31′15″E	01541	St Helen Gate - Sta Margherita Lines	Upload Photo
Glacis - Fort Verdala	Ġnien ta' Bormla	35°52′43″N 14°31′19″E	01542		Upload Photo
Tenaille - Fort Verdala	Bieb Verdala	35°52′50″N 14°31′27″E	01543	Tenaille - Fort Verdala	Upload Photo
Curtain		35°52′42″N 14°31′39″E	01559	Curtain	Upload Photo
Masonry tenaille in ditch	Ditch	35°52′42″N 14°31′40″E	01560	Masonry tenaille in ditch	Upload Photo
St. Clements Bastion		35°52′38″N 14°31′36″E	01561	St. Clements Bastion	Upload Photo
St. Clement's Curtain		35°52′38″N 14°31′29″E	01562		Upload Photo
St. Clement Gate		35°52′38″N 14°31′30″E	01563		Upload Photo
St. Nicholas Bastion	Triq San Nikola	35°52′34″N 14°31′25″E	01564	St. Nicholas Bastion	Upload Photo
St. Nicholas Curtain	Triq San Nikola	35°52′36″N 14°31′20″E	01565	St. Nicholas Curtain	Upload Photo
St. John Bastion	Triq San Ġwann t'Għuxa	35°52′34″N 14°31′13″E	01566	St. John Bastion	Upload Photo
St. John Gate	Triq San Ġwann t'Għuxa	35°52′39″N 14°31′09″E	01567	St. John Gate	Upload Photo
St. John Curtain	Triq San Ġwann t'Għuxa	35°52′38″N 14°31′10″E	01568	St. John Curtain	Upload Photo
St. Paul Bastion	Triq San Ġwann t'Għuxa	35°52′40″N 14°31′03″E	01569	St. Paul Bastion	Upload Photo
St. Paul Curtain	Triq it-Tlett Ibliet	35°52′45″N 14°31′04″E	01570	St. Paul Curtain	Upload Photo
Ditch		35°52′40″N 14°31′39″E	01571	Ditch	Upload Photo
Collegiate Parish Church of the Immaculate Conception	Triq il-Pellegrinaġġ		MSPR0024		Upload Photo
Santa Margerita Windmill	Triq Mitħna		MSPR0025		Upload Photo
T'Għuxa Windmill	Triq San Ġwann		MSPR0026		Upload Photo
