= List of monuments in Floriana =

This is a list of monuments in Floriana, Malta, which are listed on the National Inventory of the Cultural Property of the Maltese Islands., as well as Grade 1 scheduled properties from the Malta Scheduled Property Register maintained by Malta's Planning Authority. The latter are denoted by an ID beginning with the letters MSPR.

== List ==
Name of object	Location	Coordinates	ID	Photo	Upload
Msida Bastion Cemetery	Triq Vincenzo Dimech	35°53′46″N 14°30′08″E	00052	Msida Bastion Cemetery	Upload Photo
Church of the Holy Cross	Triq Franġisk Saver Fenech	35°53′21″N 14°30′16″E	00499	Church of the Holy Cross	Upload Photo
Statue of St. Francis of Assisi	Triq Franġisk Saver Fenech	35°53′22″N 14°30′16″E	00500	Statue of St. Francis of Assisi	Upload Photo
Chapel of the Madonna of Lourdes	Triq Franġisk Saver Fenech	35°53′22″N 14°30′16″E	00501	Chapel of the Madonna of Lourdes	Upload Photo
Niche of St. Anne	Triq Sant' Anna	35°53′27″N 14°30′16″E	00502	Niche of St. Anne	Upload Photo
Statue of St. Francis	Triq San Franġisk / Triq San Tumas	35°53′28″N 14°30′20″E	00503	Statue of St. Francis	Upload Photo
Statue of the Immaculate Conception	Triq il-Kapuċċini / Triq San Tumas	35°53′27″N 14°30′21″E	00504	Statue of the Immaculate Conception	Upload Photo
Niche of the Madonna of Mount Carmel	Triq San Franġisk / Triq il-Miratur	35°53′29″N 14°30′22″E	00505	Niche of the Madonna of Mount Carmel	Upload Photo
Statue of Christ the Saviour	Triq is-Suq / Triq San Franġisk	35°53′30″N 14°30′23″E	00506	Statue of Christ the Saviour	Upload Photo
Statue of St. Publius	Triq San Publiju / Triq il-Miratur	35°53′33″N 14°30′18″E	00507	Statue of St. Publius	Upload Photo
Church of St Publius	Misraħ San Publiju	35°53′33″N 14°30′17″E	00508	Church of St Publius	Upload Photo
Niche of the Immaculate Conception	61 Triq San Tumas	35°53′31″N 14°30′18″E	00509	Niche of the Immaculate Conception	Upload Photo
Church of the Immaculate Conception	Triq Sarria	35°53′31″N 14°30′13″E	00510	Church of the Immaculate Conception	Upload Photo
Niche of the Madonna of Lourdes	Triq L-Iljun / Triq il-Konservatorju	35°53′37″N 14°30′13″E	00511	Niche of the Madonna of Lourdes	Upload Photo
Niche of the Madonna of Mount Carmel	22 Triq L-Argotti	35°53′35″N 14°30′12″E	00512	Niche of the Madonna of Mount Carmel	Upload Photo
Roundel of the Madonna and Child	Triq San Kalċidonju	35°53′37″N 14°30′10″E	00513	Roundel of the Madonna and Child	Upload Photo
Niche of the Crucifix	It-Telgħa tal-Kurċifiss	35°53′33″N 14°30′33″E	00583	Niche of the Crucifix	Upload Photo
The Mall (Maglio Gardens)	Triq Sarria	35°53′36″N 14°30′18″E	01146	The Mall (Maglio Gardens)	Upload Photo
Argotti Gardens	Triq Sarria / Triq Vincenzo Bugeja	35°53′33″N 14°30′11″E	01147	Argotti Gardens	Upload Photo
Villino Bonnici	Triq Vincenzo Bugeja, Triq L-Argotti	35°53′34″N 14°30′12″E	01148	Villino Bonnici	Upload Photo
Pinto Stores	Xatt Pinto	35°53′25″N 14°30′28″E	01149	Pinto Stores	Upload Photo
Floriana Lines		35°53′27″N 14°30′04″E	01617	Floriana Lines	Upload Photo
St Francis Bastion	Triq Franġisk Saver Fenech	35°53′20″N 14°30′16″E	01618		Upload Photo
St Francis Ravelin	Triq Nazzjonali	35°53′23″N 14°30′10″E	01619		Upload Photo
St Mark Bastion	Triq Franġisk Saver Fenech	35°53′24″N 14°30′16″E	01620		Upload Photo
St Philip Bastion	Argotti Gardens	35°53′29″N 14°30′07″E	01621	St Philip Bastion	Upload Photo
St James Bastion	Argotti Gardens	35°53′32″N 14°30′07″E	01622	St James Bastion	Upload Photo
St Luke Bastion	Argotti Gardens	35°53′28″N 14°30′11″E	01623		Upload Photo
St. Anne Curtain	Triq Sant'Anna	35°53′27″N 14°30′17″E	01624	St. Anne Curtain	Upload Photo
Notre Dame Curtain	Triq Sa Maison	35°53′36″N 14°30′08″E	01625	Notre Dame Curtain	Upload Photo
Notre Dame Ravelin	Triq Sa Maison	35°53′33″N 14°30′01″E	01626	Notre Dame Ravelin	Upload Photo
San Salvatore Bastion	Triq Sa Maison	35°53′37″N 14°30′03″E	01627	San Salvatore Bastion	Upload Photo
San Salvatore Counterguard	Sa Maison Garden	35°53′38″N 14°30′00″E	01628	San Salvatore Counterguard	Upload Photo
La Vittoria Bastion	L-Ospizio	35°53′41″N 14°30′03″E	01629	La Vittoria Bastion	Upload Photo
Polverista Curtain	L-Ospizio	35°53′43″N 14°30′06″E	01630	Polverista Curtain	Upload Photo
Msida Bastion	Triq Hannibal B. Scicluna	35°53′46″N 14°30′08″E	01631	Msida Bastion	Upload Photo
Quarantine Bastion	Triq Hannibal B. Scicluna	35°53′50″N 14°30′15″E	01632	Quarantine Bastion	Upload Photo
Curtain Linking Quarantine Curtain to Msida Bastion	Triq Vincenzo Dimech	35°53′47″N 14°30′13″E	01633		Upload Photo
Notre Dame Gate	Triq Sa Maison	35°53′36″N 14°30′07″E	01634	Notre Dame Gate	Upload Photo
Capuchin Bastion	Pjazza Sir Luigi Preziosi	35°53′19″N 14°30′23″E	01635	Capuchin Bastion	Upload Photo
Kalkara Curtain	It-Telgħa tal-Kurċifiss	35°53′32″N 14°30′32″E	01636		Upload Photo
Kalkara Bastion	Ġnien Herbert Ganado	35°53′36″N 14°30′36″E	01637		Upload Photo
Crucifix Bastion	Triq Vilhena	35°53′29″N 14°30′32″E	01638	Crucifix Bastion	Upload Photo
Pieta Lunette	Jubilee Grove	35°53′35″N 14°29′55″E	01639		Upload Photo
Lunette near Portes des Bombes		35°53′29″N 14°30′02″E	01640		Upload Photo
Lunette near flank of Crownwork	Horns Street	35°53′18″N 14°30′12″E	01641		Upload Photo
Lunette on land front of crownwork	Triq il-Foss	35°53′17″N 14°29′58″E	01642		Upload Photo
Covered Way	Jubilee Grove	35°53′26″N 14°30′03″E	01643		Upload Photo
Faussebraye	from La Vittoria Bastion to Porte des Bombes	35°53′31″N 14°29′57″E	01644	Faussebraye	Upload Photo
Porte des Bombes	Triq Nazzjonali	35°53′26″N 14°30′08″E	01645	Porte des Bombes	Upload Photo
Crowned-hornworks	Triq il-Foss	35°53′17″N 14°30′03″E	01646		Upload Photo
North entrenchment	Triq J. Mangion	35°53′44″N 14°30′12″E	01647	North entrenchment	Upload Photo
Musketry spur of Marsa	Triq l-Għassara ta' l-Għeneb	35°53′11″N 14°30′04″E	01648	Musketry spur of Marsa	Upload Photo
Main ditch	from Triq Sa Maison, to Triq Notre Dame Ditch and Triq Sant'Anna	35°53′30″N 14°30′04″E	01649	Main ditch	Upload Photo
Advanced ditch	from Sa Maison to St. Francis Bastion	35°53′27″N 14°30′03″E	01650	Advanced ditch	Upload Photo
Glacis	Jubilee Grove	35°53′29″N 14°29′53″E	01651		Upload Photo
Platform near Crucifix Bastion	Triq il-Vittmi Furjaniżi tal-Gwerra	35°53′26″N 14°30′27″E	01652	Platform near Crucifix Bastion	Upload Photo
Crucifix Curtain	Triq Pietro Floriani	35°53′28″N 14°30′29″E	01653		Upload Photo
Curtain near Magazine Bastion	Triq Pietro Floriani	35°53′23″N 14°30′25″E	01654	Curtain near Magazine Bastion	Upload Photo
Wignacourt Tower and Watering Trough	Triq Sarria		MSPR0027	Wignacourt Tower and Watering Trough	Upload Photo
Pinto Stores	Triq Pinto		MSPR0028		Upload Photo
Chapel of The Holy Family's Flight from Egypt	Triq Pinto		MSPR0029		Upload Photo
Fountain located at the Mall in Floriana	Ġnien Il-Mall		MSPR0030		Upload Photo
Fountain located in St Philips Gardens in Floriana	Ġnien l-Argotti		MSPR0031		Upload Photo
Villa Agata	Triq Vincenzo Bugeja		MSPR0032		Upload Photo
Nymphaeum at Argotti Gardens	Triq Vincenzo Bugeja		MSPR0033		Upload Photo
St. Philip Bastion Garden (il-Ġnien tal-Ġeneral)	St Philip Bastion		MSPR0034		Upload Photo
The Mall	Triq Sarria		MSPR0035	The Mall	Upload Photo
Vilhena Fountain	Triq Sant Anna		MSPR0036	Vilhena Fountain	Upload Photo
Parish Church of St Publius	Misraħ San Pubbliju		MSPR0037	Parish Church of St Publius	Upload Photo
Granaries at Papa Giovanni XXIII	Pjazza Papa Giovanni XXIII		MSPR0038		Upload Photo
Granaries at Pjazza San Publiju	Pjazza San Publiju		MSPR0039	Granaries at Pjazza San Publiju	Upload Photo
Granaries at Pjazza Robert Sammut	Pjazza Robert Sammut		MSPR0040		Upload Photo
Manoel de Vilhena Monument	Pjazza Papa Giovanni XXIII		MSPR0041		Upload Photo
War Memorial	Triq Sant Anna		MSPR0042		Upload Photo
Christ the King Monument	Vjal Ir-Re Dwardu VII		MSPR0043	Christ the King Monument	Upload Photo
Royal Air Force Memorial	Vjal Nelson		MSPR0044		Upload Photo
Dante Alighieri Monument	Is-Sur ta' Sant Anna		MSPR0045		Upload Photo
