= List of monuments in Gżira =

This is a list of monuments in Gżira, Malta, which are listed on the National Inventory of the Cultural Property of the Maltese Islands.

== List ==
Name of object	Location	Coordinates	ID	Photo	Upload
Church of Christ the Redeemer			00791		Upload Photo
Parish Church Madonna of Mount Carmel			00792	Parish Church Madonna of Mount Carmel	Upload Photo
Stella Maris College Chapel			00793		Upload Photo
Niche of the Madonna of Mount Carmel			00794		Upload Photo
Lazzaretto			01169	Lazzaretto	Upload Photo
Palazzo Vecchio			01170	Palazzo Vecchio	Upload Photo
Villa Gżira			01171	Villa Gżira	Upload Photo
Fort Manoel			01315	Fort Manoel	Upload Photo
St Helen Bastion – Fort Manoel			01316	St Helen Bastion – Fort Manoel	Upload Photo
St. Anthony Bastion – Fort Manoel			01317		Upload Photo
St John Bastion – Fort Manoel			01318	St John Bastion – Fort Manoel	Upload Photo
Notre Dame Bastion – Fort Manoel			01319		Upload Photo
Ravelin – Fort Manoel			01320	Ravelin – Fort Manoel	Upload Photo
Cavalier – Fort Manoel			01321		Upload Photo
Main Gate – Fort Manoel			01322	Main Gate – Fort Manoel	Upload Photo
Gunpowder magazine – Fort Manoel			01323	Gunpowder magazine – Fort Manoel	Upload Photo
Chapel of St Anthony of Padua – Fort Manoel			01324	Chapel of St Anthony of Padua – Fort Manoel	Upload Photo
Commanding Officer's Barrack Block – Fort Manoel			01325		Upload Photo
Officers' Barrack Block – Fort Manoel			01326	Officers' Barrack Block – Fort Manoel	Upload Photo
Barrack Block – Fort Manoel			01327	Barrack Block – Fort Manoel	Upload Photo
Barrack Block – Fort Manoel			01328		Upload Photo
Sea-facing Curtain Wall Valletta – Fort Manoel			01329	Sea-facing Curtain Wall Valletta – Fort Manoel	Upload Photo
Left Curtain Wall – Fort Manoel			01330		Upload Photo
Right Curtain wall – Fort Manoel			01331	Right Curtain wall – Fort Manoel	Upload Photo
Land Front Curtain Wall – Fort Manoel			01332		Upload Photo
Tenaille – Fort Manoel			01333	Tenaille – Fort Manoel	Upload Photo
Ditch – Fort Manoel			01334	Ditch – Fort Manoel	Upload Photo
Centre Caponier – Fort Manoel			01335		Upload Photo
Left Caponier – Fort Manoel			01336		Upload Photo
Right Caponier – Fort Manoel			01337		Upload Photo
Gate court – Fort Manoel			01338		Upload Photo
Glacis – Fort Manoel			01339	Glacis – Fort Manoel	Upload Photo
Demi-Caponier – Fort Manoel			01340		Upload Photo
Demi-Caponier – Fort Manoel			01341		Upload Photo
Covertway – Fort Manoel			01342		Upload Photo
Piazza – Fort Manoel			01343	Piazza – Fort Manoel	Upload Photo
Couvre Porte – Fort Manoel			01344	Couvre Porte – Fort Manoel	Upload Photo
Empire Stadium entrance	Triq l-Imsida k/m Triq D'Argens	35°54′06″N 14°29′28″E	02586	more files	Upload Photo
