= List of monuments in Mġarr =

This is a list of monuments in Mġarr, Malta, which are listed on the National Inventory of the Cultural Property of the Maltese Islands.

== List ==
Name of object	Location	Coordinates	ID	Photo	Upload
Ta' Ħaġrat Temples			00011	Ta' Ħaġrat Temples	Upload Photo
Għajn Tuffieħa Roman Baths			00012	Għajn Tuffieħa Roman Baths	Upload Photo
Skorba Temples			00015	Skorba Temples	Upload Photo
Għajn Tuffieħa Tower	Għajn Tuffieħa		00057	Għajn Tuffieħa Tower	Upload Photo
Lippija Tower			00058	Lippija Tower	Upload Photo
Falca Gap Entrenchment			01425	Falca Gap Entrenchment	Upload Photo
