= List of monuments in Pembroke, Malta =

This is a list of monuments in Pembroke, Malta, which are listed on the National Inventory of the Cultural Property of the Maltese Islands.

== List ==
Name of object	Location	Coordinates	ID	Photo	Upload
Madliena Tower	Triq it-Torri tal-Madliena (off Triq Martin Luther King)	35°56′12″N 14°28′23″E	00050	Madliena Tower	Upload Photo
Madliena Fougasse	Triq it-Torri tal-Madliena (off Triq Martin Luther King)	35°56′11″N 14°28′22″E	01435	Madliena Fougasse	Upload Photo
