= List of monuments in Marsa, Malta =

This is a list of monuments in Marsa, Malta, which are listed on the National Inventory of the Cultural Property of the Maltese Islands.

== List ==
| Name of object | Location | Coordinates | ID | Photo | Upload |
|---|---|---|---|---|---|
| Niche of St Paul | 53 Triq Patri Feliċjan Bilocca | 35°53′04″N 14°29′44″E | 00584 | Niche of St Paul | Upload Photo |
| Niche of St. Lawrence | Triq Miġġiani | 35°53′04″N 14°29′44″E | 00585 | Niche of St. Lawrence | Upload Photo |
| Niche of St. Vincent Ferrer | 29 Triq is-Sajjieda | 35°53′02″N 14°29′45″E | 00586 | Niche of St. Vincent Ferrer | Upload Photo |
| Niche of St Joseph | 60 Triq is-Sajjieda | 35°53′02″N 14°29′46″E | 00587 | Niche of St Joseph | Upload Photo |
| Niche of the Madonna and Child | 51 Triq is-Sajjieda | 35°53′02″N 14°29′46″E | 00588 | Niche of the Madonna and Child | Upload Photo |
| Parish Church of the Holy Trinity | Triq is-Salib tal-Marsa | 35°52′58″N 14°29′39″E | 00589 | Parish Church of the Holy Trinity | Upload Photo |
| Niche of the Madonna of Lourdes | Sqaq l-Ajkla | 35°53′00″N 14°29′52″E | 00590 | Niche of the Madonna of Lourdes | Upload Photo |
| Niche of Christ the King | Triq it-Tiġrija c/w Triq is-Salib tal-Marsa | 35°52′48″N 14°29′38″E | 00591 | Niche of Christ the King | Upload Photo |
| Cross of Marsa | Triq is-Salib tal-Marsa | 35°52′47″N 14°29′39″E | 00592 | Cross of Marsa | Upload Photo |
| Niche of the Madonna of Lourdes | Triq it-Tiġrija c/w Triq Ascot | 35°52′48″N 14°29′38″E | 00593 | Niche of the Madonna of Lourdes | Upload Photo |
| Niche of St Paul | Triq il-Marsa c/w Triq L-Għabex | 35°52′52″N 14°29′29″E | 00594 | Niche of St Paul | Upload Photo |
| Niche of the Madonna of the Rosary | 54 Triq is-Salib tal-Marsa | 35°52′48″N 14°29′39″E | 00595 | | Upload Photo |
| Niche of St. Gorg Preca | Triq is-Salib tal-Marsa c/w Triq L-Irħam | 35°52′50″N 14°29′39″E | 00596 | Niche of St. Gorg Preca | Upload Photo |
| Empty Niche | Triq is-Salib tal-Marsa c/w Triq San Bernard | 35°52′57″N 14°29′41″E | 00597 | Empty Niche | Upload Photo |
| Niche of the Sacred Heart of Jesus | Triq is-Salib tal-Marsa c/w Triq il-Kappuċċini | 35°52′59″N 14°29′41″E | 00598 | Niche of the Sacred Heart of Jesus | Upload Photo |
| Niche of St. Pius X | 83 Triq Balbi | 35°52′57″N 14°29′34″E | 00599 | Niche of St. Pius X | Upload Photo |
| Niche of St Joseph | 25-27 Triq Balbi | 35°52′56″N 14°29′30″E | 00600 | Niche of St Joseph | Upload Photo |
| Niche of St. Francis Xavier | 27 Triq in-Nażżarenu | 35°53′08″N 14°29′39″E | 00601 | Niche of St. Francis Xavier | Upload Photo |
| Niche of Ecce Homo | 7 Triq in-Nażżarenu c/w Triq is-Santissima Trinità | 35°53′09″N 14°29′42″E | 00602 | Niche of Ecce Homo | Upload Photo |
| Niche of the Madonna of the Rosary | 73-75 Triq Sant' Antnin | 35°53′10″N 14°29′42″E | 00603 | Niche of the Madonna of the Rosary | Upload Photo |
| Niche of the Madonna of Mount Carmel | Pjazza Patri Magri | 35°53′06″N 14°29′25″E | 00604 | Niche of the Madonna of Mount Carmel | Upload Photo |
| Niche of St Michael | Triq Ħal-Qormi c/w Triq Patri Magri | 35°53′09″N 14°29′27″E | 00605 | Niche of St Michael | Upload Photo |
| Niche of the Madonna of Mount Carmel | Triq Ħal-Qormi c/w Triq tal-Karmnu | 35°53′03″N 14°29′20″E | 00606 | Niche of the Madonna of Mount Carmel | Upload Photo |
| Niche of the Madonna of Lourdes | Triq Ħal-Qormi c/w Triq il-Kunċiżżjoni | 35°53′02″N 14°29′19″E | 00607 | Niche of the Madonna of Lourdes | Upload Photo |
| Niche of St Michael | 177 Triq Ħal-Qormi c/w Triq San Mikiel | 35°53′02″N 14°29′18″E | 00608 | Niche of St Michael | Upload Photo |
| Niche of St Joseph | 175 Triq Ħal-Qormi c/w Triq San Mikiel | 35°53′02″N 14°29′18″E | 00609 | Niche of St Joseph | Upload Photo |
| Niche of the Sacred Heart of Jesus | 189 Triq Ħal-Qormi | 35°53′01″N 14°29′17″E | 00610 | Niche of the Sacred Heart of Jesus | Upload Photo |
| Niche of the Assumption | Triq Ħal-Qormi c/w Triq L-Assunta | 35°53′01″N 14°29′17″E | 00611 | Niche of the Assumption | Upload Photo |
| Niche of St. Francis | 219 Triq Ħal-Qormi c/w Triq San Franġisk | 35°53′00″N 14°29′15″E | 00612 | Niche of St. Francis | Upload Photo |
| Niche of the Sacred Heart of Jesus | "Dixie", Triq Isouard | 35°53′01″N 14°29′24″E | 00613 | Niche of the Sacred Heart of Jesus | Upload Photo |
| Niche of St George | 15-17 Triq Isouard | 35°53′01″N 14°29′25″E | 00614 | Niche of St George | Upload Photo |
| Niche of the Madonna and Child (empty) | 68 Triq il-Marsa c/w Triq Isouard | 35°53′01″N 14°29′26″E | 00615 | Niche of the Madonna and Child (empty) | Upload Photo |
| Niche of the Madonna of Lourdes | 76 Triq Azzopardi | 35°52′58″N 14°29′24″E | 00616 | Niche of the Madonna of Lourdes | Upload Photo |
| Niche of St. Benedict | Triq il-Pitkali c/w Triq is-Santissima Trinità | 35°53′07″N 14°29′43″E | 00617 | Niche of St. Benedict | Upload Photo |
| Niche of St Joseph | 187 Triq Stefano Zerafa | 35°53′04″N 14°29′34″E | 00618 | Niche of St Joseph | Upload Photo |
| Niche of St George | 28 Triq il-Moll tal-Knisja | 35°52′48″N 14°29′44″E | 00619 | Niche of St George | Upload Photo |
| Church of the Madonna of Graces | Triq il-Moll tal-Knisja | 35°52′51″N 14°29′47″E | 00620 | Church of the Madonna of Graces | Upload Photo |
| Niche of the Madonna of Sorrows | Triq il-Labour c/w Triq ix-Xwieni | 35°52′25″N 14°29′47″E | 00621 | Niche of the Madonna of Sorrows | Upload Photo |
| Chapel of the Sacred Heart of Jesus | 18 Triq il-Prinċep Albertu | 35°52′32″N 14°29′52″E | 00622 | Chapel of the Sacred Heart of Jesus | Upload Photo |
| Villa Violette | Triq is-Salib tal-Marsa c/w Triq San Bernard | 35°52′56″N 14°29′41″E | 01178 | Villa Violette | Upload Photo |
| Torri tal-Ilma tal-Biċċerija | Triq il-Biċċerija | 35°52′39″N 14°29′55″E | 02594 | | Upload Photo |
| Entratura Prinċipali għall-Biċċerija | Triq il-Biċċerija | 35°52′39″N 14°29′34″E | 02595 | Entratura Prinċipali għall-Biċċerija | Upload Photo |
| Vista bejn l-Entratura u t-Torri tal-Ilma | Triq il-Biċċerija | 35°52′39″N 14°29′34″E | 02596 | | Upload Photo |
