= List of monuments in Kerċem =

This is a list of monuments in Kerċem, Gozo, Malta, which are listed on the National Inventory of the Cultural Property of the Maltese Islands.

== List ==
Name of object	Location	Coordinates	ID	Photo	Upload
Kerċem tombs	Pjazza San Girgor	36°02′31″N 14°13′39″E	00027		Upload Photo
Chapel of Saint Lucy	Pjazza Santa Luċija	36°02′34″N 14°13′01″E	00952	Chapel of Saint Lucy	Upload Photo
Niche of the Madonna with Baby Jesus	Pjazza Santa Luċija c/w Triq Għajn Għabdul	36°02′35″N 14°13′01″E	00953		Upload Photo
Cross	Pjazza Santa Luċija	36°02′35″N 14°13′03″E	00954		Upload Photo
Niche of the Madonna tal-Hlas	170 Triq San Girgor	36°02′31″N 14°13′45″E	00955		Upload Photo
Parish Church of Our Lady of Perpetual Help and Saint Gregory the Great	Pjazza San Girgor	36°02′31″N 14°13′38″E	00956	Parish Church of Our Lady of Perpetual Help and Saint Gregory the Great	Upload Photo
Niche of St Anthony of Padua	95 Pjazza San Girgor	36°02′30″N 14°13′37″E	00957		Upload Photo
Niche tal-Madonna tal-Patri	Triq Santa Luċija c/w Triq Qasam San Pawl	36°02′27″N 14°13′24″E	00958		Upload Photo
Niche of St Joseph	5 Triq Ġużeppi Briffa	36°02′30″N 14°13′47″E	00959		Upload Photo
Niche of Our Lady of Perpetual Help	Triq Ġużeppi Briffa	36°02′29″N 14°13′47″E	00960		Upload Photo
Niche of the Crucifix (empty)	59 Triq ta-Xuxa	36°02′31″N 14°13′49″E	00961		Upload Photo
Niche of the Madonna of Mount Carmel	Triq Diċembru Tlettax c/w Triq San Niklaw c/w Triq Qasam San Ġorġ	36°02′44″N 14°13′18″E	00962		Upload Photo
Niche of Saint Lucy	Pjazza Santa Luċija	36°02′34″N 14°13′01″E	00963		Upload Photo
