= List of monuments in Balzan =

This is a list of monuments in Balzan, Malta, which are listed on the National Inventory of the Cultural Property of the Maltese Islands.

== List ==
Name of object	Location	Coordinates	ID	Photo	Upload
Niche of St Roque	Triq il-Kbira / Triq wied ta'Hal Balzan	35°53′51″N 14°27′20″E	00160	Niche of St Roque	Upload Photo
Niche of St Paul	82 Triq San Frangisk	35°53′49″N 14°27′16″E	00161	Niche of St Paul	Upload Photo
Statue of St Peter	36 Triq Idmejda	35°53′56″N 14°27′04″E	00162	Statue of St Peter	Upload Photo
Statue of St Paul	36 Triq Idmejda	35°53′55″N 14°27′04″E	00163	Statue of St Paul	Upload Photo
Statue of Our Lady	36 Triq Idmejda	35°53′55″N 14°27′04″E	00164	Statue of Our Lady	Upload Photo
Statue of Angel Gabriel	36 Triq Idmejda	35°53′55″N 14°27′03″E	00165	Statue of Angel Gabriel	Upload Photo
Church of Our Lady of Annunciation	84 Triq il-Kbira	35°53′55″N 14°27′05″E	00166	Church of Our Lady of Annunciation	Upload Photo
Statue of St Joseph	Triq Annunzjata / Triq Dun Spir Sammut	35°53′56″N 14°27′04″E	00167	Statue of St Joseph	Upload Photo
Church Annunciation of Our Lady	Triq it-Tlett Knejjes	35°53′56″N 14°27′11″E	00168	Church Annunciation of Our Lady	Upload Photo
Church of St Roque	Triq it-Tlett Knejjes	35°53′56″N 14°27′10″E	00169	Church of St Roque	Upload Photo
Stone Cross	Triq it-Tlett Knejjes	35°53′56″N 14°27′10″E	00170	Stone Cross	Upload Photo
Church of St Anard	Triq it-Tlett Knejjes	35°53′56″N 14°27′11″E	00171	Church of St Anard	Upload Photo
Niche of the Crucifix	Triq it-Tlett Knejjes	35°53′56″N 14°27′11″E	00172	Niche of the Crucifix	Upload Photo
Niche of St Roque	Triq Santu Rokku / Triq il-Providenza	35°53′54″N 14°27′11″E	00173	Niche of St Roque	Upload Photo
Niche of the Immaculate Conception	Sqaq No 1, Triq il-Providenza	35°53′53″N 14°27′12″E	00174	Niche of the Immaculate Conception	Upload Photo
Niche of the Madonna tar-Rummiena	235 Triq il-Providenza / Triq il-Kbira	35°53′53″N 14°27′11″E	00175	Niche of the Madonna tar-Rummiena	Upload Photo
Niche of Our Lady of the Abandoned	Triq San Valentin / Triq Dum Amabile Sisner	35°53′51″N 14°27′01″E	00176	Niche of Our Lady of the Abandoned	Upload Photo
Church Good Shepherd	Triq Idmejd	35°53′50″N 14°27′06″E	00177	Church Good Shepherd	Upload Photo
Niche of Our Lady of Lourdes	207 Triq il-Kbira	35°53′54″N 14°26′59″E	00178	Niche of Our Lady of Lourdes	Upload Photo
Statue of St Mary	Triq il-Kbira	35°53′54″N 14°26′58″E	00179	Statue of St Mary	Upload Photo
Church of St Mary	Triq il-Kbira	35°53′55″N 14°26′58″E	00180	Church of St Mary	Upload Photo
Niċċa tal-Kunċizzjoni	187 Triq il-Kbira	35°53′54″N 14°26′56″E	00181	Niċċa tal-Kunċizzjoni	Upload Photo
Niche of St Francis of Paola	Malta University Residence	35°54′00″N 14°26′57″E	00182		Upload Photo
Stone Cross	Triq L-Imdina / Mriehel Bypass	35°53′35″N 14°26′50″E	00183	Stone Cross	Upload Photo
Relief Our Lady with baby Jesus	163 Triq Annibale Preca	35°53′54″N 14°26′50″E	00184	Relief Our Lady with baby Jesus	Upload Photo
Church of Our Lady with Baby Jesus	163 Triq Annibale Preca	35°53′54″N 14°26′50″E	00185	Church of Our Lady with Baby Jesus	Upload Photo
Palazzo Bosio	10 Zahra	35°53′57″N 14°27′09″E	01154	Palazzo Bosio	Upload Photo
Wignacourt Aqueduct	Triq L-Imdina	35°53′36″N 14°27′22″E	01155	Wignacourt Aqueduct	Upload Photo
Villa Macedonia and Gardens	Triq Sisner	35°53′50″N 14°27′01″E	01156	Villa Macedonia and Gardens	Upload Photo
Il-Ġnien tal-Kmand (Garden) and ancillary structures	Triq in-Naxxar		MSPR0075		Upload Photo
