= List of monuments in Qala, Malta =

This is a list of monuments in Qala, Gozo, Malta, which are listed on the National Inventory of the Cultural Property of the Maltese Islands.

== List ==
Name of object	Location	Coordinates	ID	Photo	Upload
St Anthony Battery	Ta'Vardati, Ras il-Qala	36°01′58″N 14°20′07″E	00039	St Anthony Battery	Upload Photo
Parish Church of the Immaculate Conception and St. Joseph	Pjazza San Ġużepp	36°02′09″N 14°18′42″E	01035	Parish Church of the Immaculate Conception and St. Joseph	Upload Photo
Statue of the Immacalute Conception	Pjazza San Ġużepp	36°02′07″N 14°18′41″E	01036		Upload Photo
Statue of St Joseph	Pjazza Repubblika	36°02′20″N 14°18′33″E	01037		Upload Photo
Chapel of the Immaculate Conception Tal-Hondoq	Triq il-Kunċizzjoni	36°02′02″N 14°19′16″E	01038		Upload Photo
Niche of the Immaculate Conception	Triq il-Kunċizzjoni	36°02′03″N 14°19′15″E	01039		Upload Photo
Niche of the Madonna of Stella Maris	Triq Hondoq ir-Rummien	36°01′44″N 14°19′17″E	01040		Upload Photo
Chapel of tal-Blat	Triq Hondoq ir-Rummien	36°01′45″N 14°19′17″E	01041		Upload Photo
Empty Niche	125 Triq il-Kunċizzjoni	36°02′07″N 14°18′45″E	01042		Upload Photo
Empty Niche	138 Triq il-Kunċizzjoni	36°02′07″N 14°18′42″E	01043		Upload Photo
