= List of monuments in Żebbuġ, Gozo =

This is a list of monuments in Żebbuġ, Gozo, Malta, which are listed on the National Inventory of the Cultural Property of the Maltese Islands.

== List ==
Name of object	Location	Coordinates	ID	Photo	Upload
Niche of the Assumption	Triq il-Knisja	36°04′01″N 14°14′06″E	01015		Upload Photo
Niche of St Joseph	Triq il-Knisja	36°04′04″N 14°14′05″E	01016	Niche of St Joseph	Upload Photo
Parish church of the Assumption of the Madonna	Pjazza L-Assunta	36°04′12″N 14°14′10″E	01017	Parish church of the Assumption of the Madonna	Upload Photo
Niche of St. Anthony of Padua	Triq il-Madonna taċ-Ċiċri c/w Sqaq Anton Mallia	36°04′14″N 14°14′09″E	01018		Upload Photo
Niche of the Blessed Mary of Mercy	Triq il-Madonna taċ-Ċiċri	36°04′23″N 14°14′11″E	01019		Upload Photo
Niche of the Madonna of Lourdes	"Welcome", Triq il-Ponta	36°03′59″N 14°13′58″E	01020		Upload Photo
Niche of the Sacred Heart of Jesus	15 Triq Ġoma c/w Triq Dun Franġisk Vella	36°04′03″N 14°14′02″E	01021		Upload Photo
Niche of the Assumption	Triq Santa Marija c/w Triq is-Salini, Marsalforn	36°04′31″N 14°15′28″E	01022		Upload Photo
Chapel of St. Paul's Shipwreck	Pjazza San Pawl, Marsalforn	36°04′17″N 14°15′39″E	01023	Chapel of St. Paul's Shipwreck	Upload Photo
Niche of the Madonna of Lourdes	Triq ix-Xwejni, Marsalforn		01024		Upload Photo
Qolla il-Bajda Battery	L-Qolla l-Bajda	36°04′47″N 14°15′05″E	01417	Qolla il-Bajda Battery	Upload Photo
Qbajjar entrenchment remains	Triq Santa Marija, Qbajjar Bay	36°04′34″N 14°15′11″E	01420		Upload Photo
Marsalforn Fougasse	Triq Santa Marija, Marsalforn Bay	36°04′20″N 14°15′29″E	01434		Upload Photo
