= List of monuments in Munxar =

This is a list of monuments in Munxar, Gozo, Malta, which are listed on the National Inventory of the Cultural Property of the Maltese Islands.

== List ==
Name of object	Location	Coordinates	ID	Photo	Upload
Xlendi Tower	Tar-Ras, Xlendi	36°01′39″N 14°12′47″E	00036	Xlendi Tower	Upload Photo
Niche of the Madonna of Mount Carmel	Triq ix-Xlendi	36°02′02″N 14°13′47″E	01025		Upload Photo
Statue of the Madonna of Mount Carmel	Triq ir-Rabat, Xlendi	36°01′54″N 14°13′11″E	01026	Statue of the Madonna of Mount Carmel	Upload Photo
Chapel of the Madonna of Mount Carmel	Triq ir-Rabat, Xlendi	36°01′55″N 14°13′12″E	01027	Chapel of the Madonna of Mount Carmel	Upload Photo
Statue of St. Andrew	Triq Sant' Andrija	36°01′51″N 14°13′01″E	01028	Statue of St. Andrew	Upload Photo
Niche of the Sacred Heart of Jesus	58 Triq San Pawl	36°01′50″N 14°14′03″E	01029	Niche of the Sacred Heart of Jesus	Upload Photo
Niche of the Immaculate Conception	"Tal-Kunċiżżjoni", Triq Dun Alan Fenech	36°01′50″N 14°14′02″E	01030	Niche of the Immaculate Conception	Upload Photo
Niche of St. Margaret	Triq San Pawl c/w Triq Dun Spir Gauci	36°01′50″N 14°14′04″E	01031	Niche of St. Margaret	Upload Photo
Parish Church of St. Paul's Shipwreck	Triq San Pawl	36°01′51″N 14°14′05″E	01032	Parish Church of St. Paul's Shipwreck	Upload Photo
Niche of the Madonna of Mount Carmel			01033		Upload Photo
Niche of the Madonna of the Rosary	10 Triq it-12 ta' Diċembru 1957	36°01′47″N 14°13′59″E	01034	Niche of the Madonna of the Rosary	Upload Photo
