= List of monuments in San Ġwann =

This is a list of monuments in San Ġwann, Malta, which are listed on the National Inventory of the Cultural Property of the Maltese Islands.

== List ==
Name of object	Location	Coordinates	ID	Photo	Upload
Niche of St. Anthony	125 Triq Birkirkara c/w Triq San Pietru	35°54′33″N 14°28′57″E	00780	Niche of St. Anthony	Upload Photo
Church of the Annunciation	Triq il-Baħar l-Iswed	35°54′50″N 14°28′49″E	00781	Church of the Annunciation	Upload Photo
Statue of the Assumption	Triq il-Baħar l-Iswed	35°54′50″N 14°28′49″E	00782	Statue of the Assumption	Upload Photo
Church of St. Margaret	Triq Santa Margerita c/w Triq il-Kappella	35°54′36″N 14°28′37″E	00783	Church of St. Margaret	Upload Photo
Church of St. Philip and St. James	Triq tal-Prepostu	35°54′43″N 14°28′00″E	00784	Church of St. Philip and St. James	Upload Photo
Church of San Gwann tal-Gharghar	Triq Bellavista c/w Triq San Ġwann tal-Għargħar	35°54′24″N 14°28′43″E	00785	Church of San Gwann tal-Gharghar	Upload Photo
Niche of the Madonna of Mount Carmel	283 Triq tas-Sliema	35°54′22″N 14°28′55″E	00786		Upload Photo
Niche of the Madonna of Mount Carmel	194 Triq Bellavista c/w Triq il-Korvu	35°54′24″N 14°28′48″E	00787		Upload Photo
Parish Church of the Madonna of Lourdes	Vjal ir-Riħan c/w Misraħ Lourdes	35°54′28″N 14°28′37″E	00788	Parish Church of the Madonna of Lourdes	Upload Photo
Ta' Xindi Farmhouse	166 Triq San Ġiljan	35°54′21″N 14°28′38″E	01222	Ta' Xindi Farmhouse	Upload Photo
