= List of monuments in Kirkop =

This is a list of monuments in Kirkop, Malta, which are listed on the National Inventory of the Cultural Property of the Maltese Islands.

== List ==
Name of object	Location	Coordinates	ID	Photo	Upload
Niche of Saint Leonard	12-13 Triq Valletta	35°50′39″N 14°29′10″E	01866	Niche of Saint Leonard	Upload Photo
Niche of Saint Leonard	7-8 Triq Valletta	35°50′38″N 14°29′10″E	01867	Niche of Saint Leonard	Upload Photo
Niche of St Joseph	54-55 Triq Valletta	35°50′38″N 14°29′11″E	01868	Niche of St Joseph	Upload Photo
Niche of Saint Leonard	32 Triq Valletta	35°50′34″N 14°29′10″E	01869	Niche of Saint Leonard	Upload Photo
Parish Church of Saint Leonard	Triq il-Parroċċa	35°50′32″N 14°29′09″E	01870	Parish Church of Saint Leonard	Upload Photo
Niche of Saint Lawrence	43 Triq San Leonardu	35°50′27″N 14°29′07″E	01871	Niche of Saint Lawrence	Upload Photo
Niche of St Roque	49 Triq San Benedittu	35°50′27″N 14°29′03″E	01872	Niche of St Roque	Upload Photo
Chapel of the Annunciation	Misraħ Kirkop	35°50′31″N 14°29′06″E	01873	Chapel of the Annunciation	Upload Photo
Cross	Misraħ Kirkop	35°50′31″N 14°29′06″E	01874	Cross	Upload Photo
Niche of Saint Leonard	Misraħ Kirkop / Triq San Benedittu	35°50′31″N 14°29′05″E	01875	Niche of Saint Leonard	Upload Photo
Niche of Saint Francis de Pauli	10-12 Triq San Benedittu	35°50′31″N 14°29′05″E	01876	Niche of Saint Francis de Pauli	Upload Photo
Niche of St Joseph	18-20 Triq San Benedittu	35°50′31″N 14°29′04″E	01877	Niche of St Joseph	Upload Photo
Niche of Madonna of the Sacred Heart of Jesus	5 Triq Nejder	35°50′35″N 14°29′11″E	01878	Niche of Madonna of the Sacred Heart of Jesus	Upload Photo
Niche of the Sacred Heart of Jesus	9 Triq Nejder	35°50′35″N 14°29′11″E	01879	Niche of the Sacred Heart of Jesus	Upload Photo
Niche of Madonna	29 Triq Santu Rokku	35°50′34″N 14°29′07″E	01880	Niche of Madonna	Upload Photo
Niche of Saint Leonard	24-26 Triq San Rokku	35°50′37″N 14°29′14″E	01881	Niche of Saint Leonard	Upload Photo
Chapel of Saint Nicholas	Triq San Nikola (Cemetery)	35°50′40″N 14°29′22″E	01882	Chapel of Saint Nicholas	Upload Photo
