= List of monuments in Sannat =

This is a list of monuments in Sannat, Gozo, Malta, which are listed on the National Inventory of the Cultural Property of the Maltese Islands.

== List ==
Name of object	Location	Coordinates	ID	Photo	Upload
Parish Church of St. Margaret	Pjazza Santa Margerita	36°01′36″N 14°14′34″E	01083	Parish Church of St. Margaret	Upload Photo
Niche of the Assumption	Triq Ta' Sannat	36°01′41″N 14°14′32″E	01084	Niche of the Assumption	Upload Photo
Niche of St. Francis	27 Triq ix-Xabbata	36°01′28″N 14°14′35″E	01085		Upload Photo
Niche of Madonna and Child	31 Triq ix-Xabbata	36°01′28″N 14°14′35″E	01086	Niche of Madonna and Child	Upload Photo
Niche of the Madonna of Sorrows	136 Triq il-Kbira	36°01′30″N 14°14′17″E	01087	Niche of the Madonna of Sorrows	Upload Photo
Niche of the Madonna of Lourdes	48 Triq ta-Saguna	36°01′27″N 14°14′32″E	01088		Upload Photo
Niche of the Sacred Heart of Jesus	"Dar in-Nannu", 40 Triq ta-Saguna	36°01′27″N 14°14′34″E	01089	Niche of the Sacred Heart of Jesus	Upload Photo
Niche of Madonna and Child	21 Triq Palazz Palina c/w Triq ta-Skerla, Ta' Ċenċ	36°01′22″N 14°15′00″E	01090		Upload Photo
Statue of St. Paul	Hotel Ta' Ċenċ & Spa, Ta' Ċenċ	36°01′16″N 14°15′02″E	01091	Statue of St. Paul	Upload Photo
