= List of monuments in Tarxien =

This is a list of monuments in Tarxien, Malta, which are listed on the National Inventory of the Cultural Property of the Maltese Islands.

== List ==
Name of object	Location	Coordinates	ID	Photo	Upload
Tarxien Temples	Triq it-Tempji Neolitiċi	35°52′09″N 14°30′42″E	00046	Tarxien Temples	Upload Photo
WWII Tarxien Shelter	Sqaq Brittaniku	35°51′53″N 14°30′39″E	00053	WWII Tarxien Shelter	Upload Photo
Niche of the Annunciation	Triq tal-Barrani c/w Triq San Anard	35°51′42″N 14°30′55″E	02032	Niche of the Annunciation	Upload Photo
Chapel of St Bartholomew	32 Triq il-Kbira	35°51′55″N 14°30′49″E	02033	Chapel of St Bartholomew	Upload Photo
Niche of St Bartholomew	Triq San Bartilmew	35°51′55″N 14°30′49″E	02034	Niche of St Bartholomew	Upload Photo
Niche of Madonna of Lourdes	"Leliann House", 13 Triq Sant'Anna c/w Triq il-Blata	35°51′56″N 14°30′48″E	02035	Niche of Madonna of Lourdes	Upload Photo
Chapel of Santa Marija	Triq Santa Marija / Vjal Simmons	35°51′58″N 14°30′47″E	02036	Chapel of Santa Marija	Upload Photo
Niche of Christ the Savior	27 Vjal Simmons	35°51′58″N 14°30′43″E	02037	Niche of Christ the Savior	Upload Photo
Niche of St. Spyridon	Triq Paola c/w Vjal Simmons	35°51′58″N 14°30′39″E	02038	Niche of St. Spyridon	Upload Photo
Niche of the Madonna of the Rosary	Misraħ is-Suq c/w 1 Triq Xintill	35°51′56″N 14°30′39″E	02039	Niche of the Madonna of the Rosary	Upload Photo
Niche of the Immaculate Conception	38 Triq Xintill c/w Sqaq Nru 2, Triq Xintill	35°51′56″N 14°30′36″E	02040	Niche of the Immaculate Conception	Upload Photo
Niche of the Crucifix	108 Triq Xintill (side wall)	35°51′56″N 14°30′30″E	02041	Niche of the Crucifix	Upload Photo
Niche of St Joseph	29 Triq Xintill c/w Sqaq nru. 3, Triq Xintill	35°51′56″N 14°30′36″E	02042	Niche of St Joseph	Upload Photo
Niche of the Annunciation	18/19 Misraħ is-Suq	35°51′54″N 14°30′42″E	02043	Niche of the Annunciation	Upload Photo
Niche of St Joseph	2 Triq il-Kbira	35°51′54″N 14°30′42″E	02044	Niche of St Joseph	Upload Photo
Parish Church of the Annunciation	Misraħ ir-Repubblika	35°51′54″N 14°30′40″E	02045	Parish Church of the Annunciation	Upload Photo
Niche of the Madonna of the Rosary	24 Triq il-Kbira	35°51′54″N 14°30′45″E	02046	Niche of the Madonna of the Rosary	Upload Photo
Niche of St Paul	27 Triq il-Kbira	35°51′55″N 14°30′47″E	02047	Niche of St Paul	Upload Photo
Niche of St Joseph	84 Triq Santa Marija	35°52′01″N 14°30′45″E	02048	Niche of St Joseph	Upload Photo
Empty Niche of the Madonna of Rosary	24 Triq L-Annunzjata c/w Triq Paola	35°52′02″N 14°30′38″E	02049	Empty Niche of the Madonna of Rosary	Upload Photo
Church of St. Nicholas of Tolentino	Triq il-Lampuka	35°52′04″N 14°30′29″E	02050	Church of St. Nicholas of Tolentino	Upload Photo
Chapel of the Annunciation and St Joseph	51 Triq Ħal-Tarxien	35°52′07″N 14°30′34″E	02051	Chapel of the Annunciation and St Joseph	Upload Photo
Niche of St Joseph	2 Triq Santa Tereża c/w Triq is-Sorijiet	35°52′08″N 14°30′36″E	02052	Niche of St Joseph	Upload Photo
Niche of the Madonna of Sorrows	52 Triq Santa Tereża (on the wall of cemetery)	35°52′07″N 14°30′42″E	02053	Niche of the Madonna of Sorrows	Upload Photo
Cemetery Chapel	Triq Santa Tereża	35°52′07″N 14°30′43″E	02054	Cemetery Chapel	Upload Photo
Niche of St Joseph	Triq San Ġużepp c/w Triq il-Karmnu	35°52′11″N 14°30′33″E	02055	Niche of St Joseph	Upload Photo
Dejma Cross	Triq it-Tempji Neolitiċi c/w Triq Santa Marija	35°52′04″N 14°30′39″E	02056	Dejma Cross	Upload Photo
Niche of the Madonna of Mount Carmel			02057		Upload Photo
