= List of monuments in Kalkara =

This is a list of monuments in Kalkara, Malta, which are listed on the National Inventory of the Cultural Property of the Maltese Islands.

== List ==
Name of object	Location	Coordinates	ID	Photo	Upload
Statue of St. Anthony of Padua	Triq Santa Liberata	35°53′09″N 14°31′56″E	00648	Statue of St. Anthony of Padua	Upload Photo
Statue of St. Francis	Triq Santa Liberata	35°53′08″N 14°31′59″E	00649	Statue of St. Francis	Upload Photo
Statue of St. Michael	Triq Santa Liberata	35°54′25″N 14°29′30″E	00650	Statue of St. Michael	Upload Photo
Church of St. Barbara and the Capuchin Friars	Triq Santu Rokku	35°53′08″N 14°32′00″E	00651	Church of St. Barbara and the Capuchin Friars	Upload Photo
Niche of the Madonna of Fatima	Triq Santu Rokku / Triq Kapuċċini	35°53′10″N 14°32′01″E	00652	Niche of the Madonna of Fatima	Upload Photo
Chapel of Christ the Saviour	Triq is-Salvatur	35°53′30″N 14°31′32″E	00653	Chapel of Christ the Saviour	Upload Photo
Niche of the Madonna of Loreto	83 Triq ir-Rinella / Triq Patist Borda	35°53′25″N 14°31′37″E	00654	Niche of the Madonna of Loreto	Upload Photo
Niche of St Joseph	Triq ir-Rinella / Triq is-Sienja	35°53′25″N 14°31′37″E	00655	Niche of St Joseph	Upload Photo
Niche of Saint Philomena	4 Triq Santa Filumena	35°53′20″N 14°31′44″E	00656	Niche of Saint Philomena	Upload Photo
Parish Church of St. Joseph	Misraħ l-Arċisqof Gonzi	35°53′18″N 14°31′44″E	00657	Parish Church of St. Joseph	Upload Photo
Niche of St. Theresa of Avila	Sqaq l-Ixprunara	35°53′17″N 14°31′39″E	00658	Niche of St. Theresa of Avila	Upload Photo
The Cottage	Triq Marina	35°53′25″N 14°31′33″E	01172	The Cottage	Upload Photo
Villa Portelli	Triq Marina	35°53′26″N 14°31′32″E	01173	Villa Portelli	Upload Photo
Kalkara Naval Cemetery	Triq San Leonardu	5°53′14″N 14°32′12″E	01174	more files	Upload Photo
Red House	Triq Santu Rokku / Sqaq Tewma	35°53′25″N 14°32′10″E	01175	Red House	Upload Photo
Fort Ricasoli	Gallows’ Point	35°53′50″N 14°31′36″E	01655	more files	Upload Photo
Central Bastion	Fort Ricasoli	35°53′45″N 14°31′42″E	01656		Upload Photo
Right Demi-Bastion	Fort Ricasoli	35°53′45″N 14°31′38″E	01657	Right Demi-Bastion	Upload Photo
Left Demi-Bastion	Fort Ricasoli	35°53′49″N 14°31′43″E	01658	Left Demi-Bastion	Upload Photo
Faussebarye	Fort Ricasoli	35°53′44″N 14°31′41″E	01659		Upload Photo
Counterguard	Fort Ricasoli	35°53′50″N 14°31′48″E	01660	Counterguard	Upload Photo
Sally-port	Fort Ricasoli	35°53′47″N 14°31′43″E	01661		Upload Photo
Sally-port	Fort Ricasoli	35°53′44″N 14°31′40″E	01662		Upload Photo
Right Caponier	Fort Ricasoli	35°53′44″N 14°31′40″E	01663		Upload Photo
Left Caponier	Fort Ricasoli	35°53′47″N 14°31′44″E	01664		Upload Photo
Right Ravelin	Fort Ricasoli	35°53′42″N 14°31′41″E	01665		Upload Photo
Left Ravelin	Fort Ricasoli	35°53′47″N 14°31′46″E	01666	Left Ravelin	Upload Photo
Covertway	Fort Ricasoli	35°53′43″N 14°31′46″E	01667	Covertway	Upload Photo
Glacis	Fort Ricasoli	35°53′42″N 14°31′47″E	01668		Upload Photo
Land front ditch	Fort Ricasoli	35°53′44″N 14°31′42″E	01669		Upload Photo
Sea front ditch	Fort Ricasoli	35°53′54″N 14°31′33″E	01670		Upload Photo
No 1 Bastion and Tenaille	Fort Ricasoli	35°53′55″N 14°31′27″E	01671		Upload Photo
No 1 Curtain	Fort Ricasoli	35°53′54″N 14°31′29″E	01672		Upload Photo
No. 2 Bastion	Fort Ricasoli	35°53′55″N 14°31′31″E	01673		Upload Photo
No.2 Curtain	Fort Ricasoli	35°53′53″N 14°31′33″E	01674		Upload Photo
No. 3 Bastion	Fort Ricasoli	35°53′53″N 14°31′36″E	01675		Upload Photo
Platform near No 3 Bastion	Fort Ricasoli	35°53′52″N 14°31′38″E	01676		Upload Photo
Curtain near No.4 Bastion	Fort Ricasoli	35°53′51″N 14°31′41″E	01677		Upload Photo
No 4 Bastion	Fort Ricasoli	35°53′52″N 14°31′43″E	01678	No 4 Bastion	Upload Photo
No 5 Curtain	Fort Ricasoli	35°53′50″N 14°31′43″E	01679		Upload Photo
Harbour tenaille trace	Fort Ricasoli	35°53′49″N 14°31′32″E	01680	Harbour tenaille trace	Upload Photo
Orsi Battery remains	Fort Ricasoli	35°53′54″N 14°31′25″E	01681		Upload Photo
Main Gate and remains of Governor's House	Fort Ricasoli	35°53′46″N 14°31′36″E	01682	Main Gate and remains of Governor's House	Upload Photo
Chapel of St Nicholas	Fort Ricasoli	35°53′48″N 14°31′36″E	01683		Upload Photo
Gunpowder magazine 1	Fort Ricasoli	35°53′50″N 14°31′43″E	01684		Upload Photo
Gunpowder magazine 2	Fort Ricasoli	35°53′51″N 14°31′37″E	01685		Upload Photo
