= List of monuments in Iklin =

This is a list of monuments in Iklin, Malta, which are listed on the National Inventory of the Cultural Property of the Maltese Islands.

== List ==
Name of object	Location	Coordinates	ID	Photo	Upload
Parish Church of the Holy Family	Misraħ Ninu Cremona	35°54′15″N 14°27′25″E	00789	Parish Church of the Holy Family	Upload Photo
Church of St. Michael	Triq San Mikiel	35°54′25″N 14°27′00″E	00790	Church of St. Michael	Upload Photo
