= List of monuments in Msida =

This is a list of monuments in Msida, Malta, which are listed on the National Inventory of the Cultural Property of the Maltese Islands.

== List ==
Name of object	Location	Coordinates	ID	Photo	Upload
St Joseph Parish Church	Triq ix-Xatt Ta' Xbiex	35°53′48″N 14°29′24″E	00016	St Joseph Parish Church	Upload Photo
Church of the Immaculate Conception	206 Triq il-Kunċiżżjoni	35°53′48″N 14°29′16″E	00017	Church of the Immaculate Conception	Upload Photo
Wash-house	Triq il-Wied ta' L-Imsida	35°53′48″N 14°29′10″E	00018	Wash-house	Upload Photo
Relief of the Madonna of Sorrows	176 Triq il-Wied ta' L-Imsida	35°53′48″N 14°29′14″E	00833	Relief of the Madonna of Sorrows	Upload Photo
Statue of the Immaculate Conception	206/207 Triq il-Kunċiżżjoni	35°53′48″N 14°29′16″E	00834	Statue of the Immaculate Conception	Upload Photo
Niche of the Madonna of Sorrows	39 Triq San Lwiġi	35°53′50″N 14°29′14″E	00835	Niche of the Madonna of Sorrows	Upload Photo
Niche of the Madonna of Mount Carmel	7/8 Triq San Lwiġi	35°53′51″N 14°29′15″E	00836	Niche of the Madonna of Mount Carmel	Upload Photo
Niche of the Pieta	123/124 Triq il-Kunċiżżjoni	35°53′48″N 14°29′08″E	00837	Niche of the Pieta	Upload Photo
Niche of the Annunciation	4 Triq it-Torri	35°53′47″N 14°29′06″E	00838	Niche of the Annunciation	Upload Photo
Niche of St Joseph	10 Triq il-Knisja	35°53′49″N 14°29′24″E	00839	Niche of St Joseph	Upload Photo
Niche of St Joseph	Triq ix-Xatt ta' Xbiex c/w Triq il-Monsinjur Falzon	35°53′47″N 14°29′25″E	00840	Niche of St Joseph	Upload Photo
Niche of St. Publius (missing)	53 Triq ix-Xatt ta' L-Imsida	35°53′43″N 14°29′20″E	00841	Niche of St. Publius (missing)	Upload Photo
Niche of St Roque (missing - broken lower part on site)	53 Triq ix-Xatt ta' L-Imsida	35°53′43″N 14°29′20″E	00842	Niche of St Roque (missing - broken lower part on site)	Upload Photo
Niche of St Joseph	Triq Clarence c/w Triq il-Baċir	35°53′39″N 14°29′25″E	00843	Niche of St Joseph	Upload Photo
Relief of the Madonna and Child			00844		Upload Photo
