= List of monuments in Pietà, Malta =

This is a list of monuments in Pietà, Malta, which are listed on the National Inventory of the Cultural Property of the Maltese Islands.

== List ==
Name of object	Location	Coordinates	ID	Photo	Upload
Niche of St Anthony	Triq it-Telgħa ta'Guardamangia c/w Triq Qrajten	35°53′39″N 14°29′28″E	00845	Niche of St Anthony	Upload Photo
Niche of the Immaculate Conception	Triq it-Telgħa ta'Guardamangia c/w Triq Blackley	35°53′30″N 14°29′46″E	00846	Niche of the Immaculate Conception	Upload Photo
Church of the Madonna of Sorrows	Triq id-Duluri c/w Triq Marina	35°53′28″N 14°29′48″E	00847	Church of the Madonna of Sorrows	Upload Photo
Niche of St Anthony	Triq id-Duluri c/w Triq San Girgor	35°53′23″N 14°29′39″E	00848	Niche of St Anthony	Upload Photo
Niche of St Joseph	121 Triq id-Duluri	35°53′21″N 14°29′33″E	00849	Niche of St Joseph	Upload Photo
Niche of the Madonna of Sorrows	Sqaq 3 Triq ix-Xatt c/w 176 Triq ix-Xatt	35°53′44″N 14°29′39″E	00850	Niche of the Madonna of Sorrows	Upload Photo
Niche of the Madonna of Sorrows	Sqaq 3 Triq ix-Xatt	35°53′42″N 14°29′40″E	00851	Niche of the Madonna of Sorrows	Upload Photo
Niche of the Sacred Heart of Jesus	Triq Qrajten c/w Triq Bordin	35°53′35″N 14°29′27″E	00852	Niche of the Sacred Heart of Jesus	Upload Photo
Niche of St. Lawrence	11 Triq San Ġużepp	35°53′36″N 14°29′25″E	00853	Niche of St. Lawrence	Upload Photo
Niche of St Joseph	"San Angelo", 24 Triq San Ġużepp	35°53′36″N 14°29′24″E	00854	Niche of St Joseph	Upload Photo
Niche of the Crucifix	233 Triq is-Sorijet tal-Ursolini c/w Triq it-Telgħa ta'Guardamangia	35°53′38″N 14°29′32″E	00855	Niche of the Crucifix	Upload Photo
Church of the Blessed Virgin of Loreto	Triq Bordin c/w Triq is-Sorijet tal-Ursolini	35°53′33″N 14°29′30″E	00856	Church of the Blessed Virgin of Loreto	Upload Photo
Villa Frere and Garden	128 Triq ix-Xatt	35°53′47″N 14°29′49″E	01206	more files	Upload Photo
St. Lukes Hospital	Triq San Luqa	35°53′36″N 14°29′38″E	01207	St. Lukes Hospital	Upload Photo
