= List of monuments in Għarb =

This is a list of monuments in Għarb, Gozo, Malta, which are listed on the National Inventory of the Cultural Property of the Maltese Islands.

== List ==
Name of object	Location	Coordinates	ID	Photo	Upload
Niche of St Joseph	1 Triq il-Knisja	36°03′22″N 14°12′47″E	00969		Upload Photo
Niche of the Immaculate Conception	Triq l-Għarb	36°03′20″N 14°12′54″E	00970		Upload Photo
Niche of the Assumption	Triq l-Għarb c/w Triq ta'Pinu	36°03′17″N 14°13′05″E	00971		Upload Photo
Ta' Pinu Sanctuary	Triq ta'Pinu	36°03′43″N 14°12′55″E	00972	Ta' Pinu Sanctuary	Upload Photo
Chapel of St. Publius	Trejqet San Pupulju, Għasri	36°03′55″N 14°13′01″E	00973	Chapel of St. Publius	Upload Photo
Niche of the Madonna of Graces	Triq ta'Sdieri c/w Triq il-Blata	36°03′45″N 14°12′34″E	00974	Niche of the Madonna of Graces	Upload Photo
Niche of the Madonna of Lourdes	Triq Dun Alwiġ Mizzi c/w Pjazza taż-Żjara tal-Madonna	36°03′35″N 14°12′32″E	00975		Upload Photo
Niche of St Joseph	Pjazza taż-Żjara tal-Madonna (Għarb Folklore Museum)	36°03′35″N 14°12′33″E	00976		Upload Photo
Niche of Christ the King	103 Triq il-Knisja	36°03′34″N 14°12′34″E	00977		Upload Photo
Niche of St Louis Gonzaga	24 Triq L-Isqof Mikiel Molina	36°03′48″N 14°12′32″E	00978		Upload Photo
Chapel of St Demetrius	Triq tal-Blajjar	36°04′16″N 14°12′17″E	00979	Chapel of St Demetrius	Upload Photo
Chapel of the Madonna taż-Żejt	Triq San Pietru (cemetery)	36°03′40″N 14°12′14″E	00980	Chapel of the Madonna taż-Żejt	Upload Photo
Niche of Visitation of the Madonna	Triq Monġur c/w Triq Birbuba	36°03′48″N 14°12′08″E	00981		Upload Photo
Parish Church of the Visitation of the Madonna	Pjazza taż-Żjara tal-Madonna	36°03′36″N 14°12′32″E	00982	Parish Church of the Visitation of the Madonna	Upload Photo
Niche of the Madonna of Mount Carmel	Triq il-Blata c/w Triq L-Isqof Mikiel Molina	36°03′45″N 14°12′34″E	00983		Upload Photo
Cross	Triq il-Knisja	36°03′35″N 14°12′33″E	00984	Cross	Upload Photo
Empty Niche	55-56 Triq il-Knisja	36°03′35″N 14°12′33″E	00985		Upload Photo
Empty Niche	69 Triq Dun Alwiġ Mizzi	36°03′34″N 14°12′29″E	00986		Upload Photo
