= List of monuments in Paola, Malta =

This is a list of monuments in Paola, Malta, which are listed on the National Inventory of the Cultural Property of the Maltese Islands.

== List ==
Name of object	Location	Coordinates	ID	Photo	Upload
Kordin III Temples	Triq Kordin	35°52′38″N 14°30′33″E	00045	Kordin III Temples	Upload Photo
Saflieni Hypogeum	Triq iċ-Ċimiterju	35°52′10″N 14°30′25″E	00047	Saflieni Hypogeum	Upload Photo
WWII Paola Shelter	Triq Sant' Ubaldeska c/w Triq L-Arkata	35°52′19″N 14°30′21″E	00054	WWII Paola Shelter	Upload Photo
Niche of Santa Rita	"il-Pagun", Telgħet Raħal Ġdid	35°52′38″N 14°30′08″E	00623	Niche of Santa Rita	Upload Photo
Church of the Capuchin Friars	Misraħ Sant' Antnin	35°52′37″N 14°30′35″E	00624	Church of the Capuchin Friars	Upload Photo
Niche of St Anthony of Padua	Triq Bormla c/w Sqaq Sant' Antnin	35°52′27″N 14°30′31″E	00625	Niche of St Anthony of Padua	Upload Photo
Niche of the Madonna of Mount Carmel	57 Triq Ħaż-Żabbar	35°52′23″N 14°30′33″E	00626	Niche of the Madonna of Mount Carmel	Upload Photo
Relief of the Madonna of Good Council	65 Triq Ħaż-Żabbar	35°52′23″N 14°30′35″E	00627	Relief of the Madonna of Good Council	Upload Photo
Niche of the Sacred Heart of Jesus	67 Triq Ħaż-Żabbar	35°52′24″N 14°30′35″E	00628	Niche of the Sacred Heart of Jesus	Upload Photo
Niche of St. Francis	33 Pjazza Antoine De Paule	35°52′17″N 14°30′26″E	00629	Niche of St. Francis	Upload Photo
Niche of St. Peter	Pjazza Antoine De Paule	35°52′15″N 14°30′26″E	00630	Niche of St. Peter	Upload Photo
Niche of St Paul	Pjazza Antoine De Paule c/w Triq Sammat	35°52′14″N 14°30′26″E	00631	Niche of St Paul	Upload Photo
Niche of the Madonna	Pjazza Antoine De Paule c/w Triq Sammat	35°52′14″N 14°30′26″E	00632	Niche of the Madonna	Upload Photo
Niche of St. Vincent Ferrer	88 Triq Sammat c/w Triq it-Tarzna	35°52′13″N 14°30′29″E	00633	Niche of St. Vincent Ferrer	Upload Photo
Niche of the Immaculate Conception	Triq it-Tarzna c/w 10 Triq Santa Monika	35°52′15″N 14°30′29″E	00634	Niche of the Immaculate Conception	Upload Photo
Church of the Perpetual Adoration	19 Triq Santa Monika	35°52′15″N 14°30′29″E	00635	Church of the Perpetual Adoration	Upload Photo
Niche of St Joseph	Triq il-Karmnu c/w Triq San Ġużepp	35°52′11″N 14°30′33″E	00636	Niche of St Joseph	Upload Photo
Niche of the Child Madonna	83/85 Triq il-Knisja	35°52′19″N 14°30′34″E	00637	Niche of the Child Madonna	Upload Photo
Niche of the Madonna of the Rosary	109 Triq Sammat	35°52′13″N 14°30′30″E	00638	Niche of the Madonna of the Rosary	Upload Photo
Church of Jesus of Nazareth	46 Triq Ħal Luqa	35°52′09″N 14°30′25″E	00639	Church of Jesus of Nazareth	Upload Photo
Parish Church of Christ the King	Pjazza Antoine De Paule	35°52′18″N 14°30′29″E	00640	Parish Church of Christ the King	Upload Photo
Niche of the Crucified Christ	Pjazza Antoine De Paule c/w Triq Ninu Cremona	35°52′19″N 14°30′26″E	00641	Niche of the Crucified Christ	Upload Photo
Niche of St Joseph	27 Triq L-Arkata c/w Triq Sant' Ubaldeska	35°52′18″N 14°30′21″E	00642	Niche of St Joseph	Upload Photo
Church of St. Ubaldeska	Triq Sant' Ubaldeska	35°52′19″N 14°30′21″E	00643	Church of St. Ubaldeska	Upload Photo
Niche of the Madonna of Graces	47 Triq Ninu Cremona c/w 3 Triq Sant' Ubaldeska	35°52′20″N 14°30′22″E	00644	Niche of the Madonna of Graces	Upload Photo
Niche of the Sacred Heart of Jesus	Triq Sant' Ubaldeska c/w Triq is-Sultana	35°52′22″N 14°30′22″E	00645	Niche of the Sacred Heart of Jesus	Upload Photo
Niche of the Madonna of Lourdes	Triq il-Belt Valletta c/w Triq il-Ġdida	35°52′24″N 14°30′17″E	00646	Niche of the Madonna of Lourdes	Upload Photo
Church of the Madonna of Lourdes	Triq F. Tortell c/w Triq Brittanja	35°52′27″N 14°30′11″E	00647	Church of the Madonna of Lourdes	Upload Photo
