= List of monuments in Mtarfa =

This is a list of monuments in Mtarfa, Malta, which are listed on the National Inventory of the Cultural Property of the Maltese Islands.

== List ==
Name of object	Location	Coordinates	ID	Photo	Upload
Imtarfa Military Hospital and Garden	Triq L-Imtarfa	35°53′24″N 14°23′44″E	01203	Imtarfa Military Hospital and Garden	Upload Photo
Isolation Hospital	Triq Sir David Bruce	35°53′26″N 14°23′37″E	01204	Isolation Hospital	Upload Photo
Niche of St Joseph	21-22 Triq L-Imtarfa	35°53′24″N 14°23′48″E	02316	Niche of St Joseph	Upload Photo
Church of St Oswald	Triq L-Imtarfa	35°53′25″N 14°23′46″E	02317	Church of St Oswald	Upload Photo
Statue of St Nicholas of Bari	Triq San Oswald	35°53′30″N 14°24′05″E	02318	Statue of St Nicholas of Bari	Upload Photo
Chapel of St Lucy	Triq Santa Luċija	35°53′30″N 14°23′46″E	02320	Chapel of St Lucy	Upload Photo
Niche of the Madonna of Lourdes	Triq L-Imtarfa (c/w Triq Antoine Debono)	35°53′12″N 14°23′31″E	02321	Niche of the Madonna of Lourdes	Upload Photo
Niche of St Ivo	Triq il-Maltin Internati u Eziljati	35°53′12″N 14°23′33″E	02322	Niche of St Ivo	Upload Photo
