= List of monuments in Lija =

This is a list of monuments in Lija, Malta, which are listed on the National Inventory of the Cultural Property of the Maltese Islands.

== List ==
Name of object	Location	Coordinates	ID	Photo	Upload
Niche of St Roque	73 Triq Ugo Mifsud	35°54′13″N 14°26′57″E	00806	Niche of St Roque	Upload Photo
Parish Church of Christ the Saviour	Misraħ it-Transfigurazzjoni	35°54′06″N 14°26′48″E	00807	Parish Church of Christ the Saviour	Upload Photo
Statue of St. Paul	Triq il-Forn / Triq Ugo Mifsud	35°54′09″N 14°26′50″E	00808	Statue of St. Paul	Upload Photo
Church of Saint Peter	Triq il-Forn	35°54′09″N 14°26′49″E	00809	Church of Saint Peter	Upload Photo
Niche of St Joseph	29 Triq Ugo Mifsud / Triq is-Salvatur	35°54′11″N 14°26′52″E	00810	Niche of St Joseph	Upload Photo
Niche of Saint Philip Neri	Triq Ugo Mifsud / Triq Mabel Strickland	35°54′11″N 14°26′54″E	00811	Niche of Saint Philip Neri	Upload Photo
Church of Christ the Saviour (Old Church)	Triq is-Salvatur	35°54′12″N 14°26′52″E	00812	Church of Christ the Saviour (Old Church)	Upload Photo
Church of Saint Andrew	Triq Udo Mifsud	35°54′02″N 14°26′47″E	00813	Church of Saint Andrew	Upload Photo
Church of St. Mary	Triq San Andrija / Triq il-Kbira	35°54′01″N 14°26′47″E	00814	Church of St. Mary	Upload Photo
Niche of St Joseph	16 Triq il-Forn	35°54′04″N 14°26′45″E	00815	Niche of St Joseph	Upload Photo
Niche of the Madonna of Mount Carmel	Triq il-Kunċizzjoni / Triq il-Forn Sqaq No 3	35°54′05″N 14°26′43″E	00816	Niche of the Madonna of Mount Carmel	Upload Photo
Niche of the Madonna of Lourdes	42 Triq il-Forn	35°54′06″N 14°26′44″E	00817	Niche of the Madonna of Lourdes	Upload Photo
Niche of the Madonna of Sorrows	Triq il-Forn / Triq il-Knisja	35°54′07″N 14°26′45″E	00818	Niche of the Madonna of Sorrows	Upload Photo
Statue of St Joseph	181 Triq Annibale Preca	35°53′54″N 14°26′47″E	00819	Statue of St Joseph	Upload Photo
Niche of the Annunciation	181 Triq Annibale Preca	35°53′54″N 14°26′47″E	00820	Niche of the Annunciation	Upload Photo
Relief of St. Joseph	Triq Annibale Preca / Triq Sant'Antnin	35°53′53″N 14°26′48″E	00821	Relief of St. Joseph	Upload Photo
Niche of the Sacred Heart of Jesus	196 Triq Annibale Preca	35°53′53″N 14°26′44″E	00822	Niche of the Sacred Heart of Jesus	Upload Photo
Niche of St. Francis	Triq Sant' Andrija / Triq Sant' Andrija Sqaq No 2	35°53′57″N 14°26′44″E	00823	Niche of St. Francis	Upload Photo
Niche of Christ the Saviour	Triq Sant' Andrija / Triq Enejja	35°53′58″N 14°26′45″E	00824	Niche of Christ the Saviour	Upload Photo
Niche of the Assumption	8 Triq Enejja	35°53′57″N 14°26′47″E	00825	Niche of the Assumption	Upload Photo
Church of the Madonna tal-Mirakli	Triq il-Mitħna / Triq Annibale Preca	35°53′49″N 14°26′16″E	00826	Church of the Madonna tal-Mirakli	Upload Photo
Niche of the Madonna of Lourdes	10 Triq Annibale Preca	35°53′50″N 14°26′17″E	00827	Niche of the Madonna of Lourdes	Upload Photo
Church of the Immaculate Conception	Triq il-Kunċizzjoni / Triq il-Mitħna	35°54′02″N 14°26′32″E	00828	Church of the Immaculate Conception	Upload Photo
Niche of St Nicholas	64 Triq il-Kunċizzjoni	35°54′03″N 14°26′36″E	00829	Niche of St Nicholas	Upload Photo
Relief of the Sacred Heart of Jesus	33-35 Triq Annibale Preca	35°53′51″N 14°26′25″E	00830	Relief of the Sacred Heart of Jesus	Upload Photo
Niche of St Michael	6 Triq Merino	35°54′12″N 14°26′46″E	00831	Niche of St Michael	Upload Photo
Church of St. Mary	Triq Mabel Strickland	35°54′13″N 14°26′53″E	00832	Church of St. Mary	Upload Photo
Palazzo Francia	Triq Preziosi	35°54′11″N 14°26′42″E	01176	Palazzo Francia	Upload Photo
Villa Gourgion	4 Triq il-Kbira	35°54′08″N 14°26′50″E	01177	Villa Gourgion	Upload Photo
