= List of monuments in Malta =

These are the lists of monuments in Malta found on the National Inventory of the Cultural Property of the Maltese Islands (NICPMI). They are sorted by their location in their respective local council.

== List ==
- List of monuments in Attard
- List of monuments in Balzan
- List of monuments in Birgu
- List of monuments in Birkirkara
- List of monuments in Birżebbuġa
- List of monuments in Cospicua
- List of monuments in Dingli
- List of monuments in Fgura
- List of monuments in Floriana
- List of monuments in Fontana, Gozo
- List of monuments in Gudja
- List of monuments in Għajnsielem
- List of monuments in Għarb
- List of monuments in Għasri
- List of monuments in Għaxaq
- List of monuments in Gżira
- List of monuments in Ħamrun
- List of monuments in Iklin
- List of monuments in Kalkara
- List of monuments in Kerċem
- List of monuments in Kirkop
- List of monuments in Lija
- List of monuments in Luqa
- List of monuments in Marsa, Malta
- List of monuments in Marsaskala
- List of monuments in Marsaxlokk
- List of monuments in Mdina
- List of monuments in Mellieħa
- List of monuments in Mosta
- List of monuments in Mqabba
- List of monuments in Msida
- List of monuments in Mtarfa
- List of monuments in Munxar
- List of monuments in Mġarr
- List of monuments in Nadur
- List of monuments in Naxxar
- List of monuments in Paola, Malta
- List of monuments in Pembroke, Malta
- List of monuments in Pietà, Malta
- List of monuments in Qala, Malta
- List of monuments in Qormi
- List of monuments in Qrendi
- List of monuments in Rabat, Malta
- List of monuments in Safi, Malta
- List of monuments in San Lawrenz
- List of monuments in San Ġwann
- List of monuments in Sannat
- List of monuments in Santa Venera
- List of monuments in Senglea
- List of monuments in Siġġiewi
- List of monuments in Sliema
- List of monuments in St. Julian's
- List of monuments in St. Paul's Bay
- List of monuments in Tarxien
- List of monuments in Valletta
- List of monuments in Victoria, Gozo
- List of monuments in Xagħra
- List of monuments in Xewkija
- List of monuments in Żabbar
- List of monuments in Żebbuġ
- List of monuments in Żebbuġ, Gozo
- List of monuments in Żejtun
- List of monuments in Żurrieq
