= Ras il-Wardija =

Promontory on Gozo, Malta

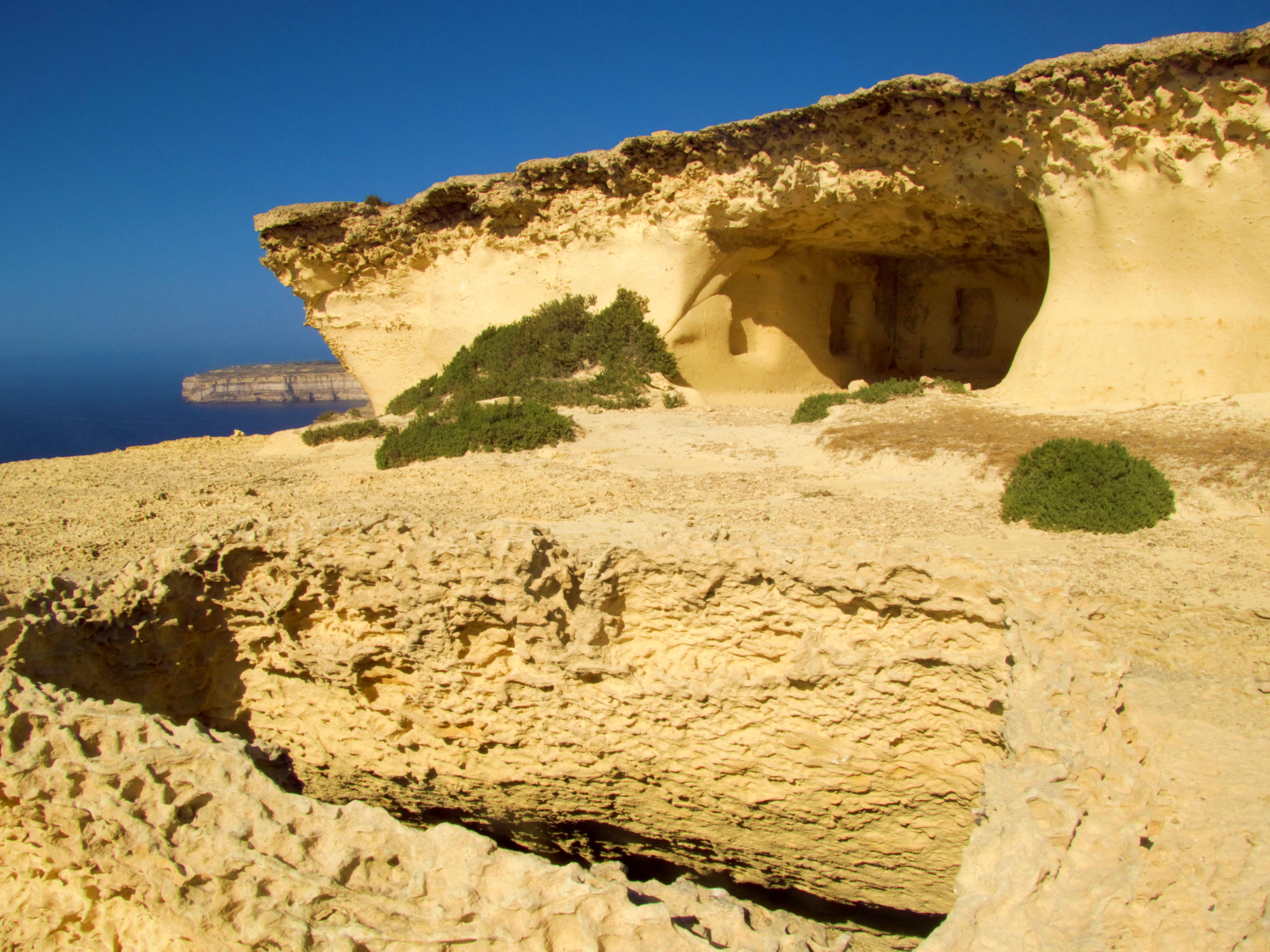
- Rock-hewn chamber at Ras il-Wardija

- Location within Malta
- 36°2′11.8″N 14°11′13.3″E
- Type: Religious complex, possibly a nymphaeum
- Periods: Punic and Roman
- Location: San Lawrenz, Gozo, Malta

History
- Built: 3rd century BC
- Abandoned: 4th century AD

Site notes
- Material: Limestone
- Excavation dates: 1964–1967
- Archaeologists: Missione Archaeologica Italiana a Malta
- Condition: Dilapidated
- Owner: George Spiteri
- Public access: Limited

Ras il-Wardija is a promontory in the limits of San Lawrenz, on the southwest coast of Gozo, Malta. It contains the remains of a Punic-Roman sanctuary, which was excavated by Italian archaeologists in the 1960s. The area is privately owned and in a dilapidated state.

== The site ==
Ras il-Wardija was probably first inhabited in the Bronze Age, in around 1500 BC. Around the 3rd century BC, during the Punic period, a religious complex (probably a nymphaeum) was established in the area. Since the site is clearly visible from the sea, it might have also served as a beacon for ships travelling between the Maltese Islands and North Africa.

The site remained in use throughout the Roman period. Carved crosses on the walls suggest that the site eventually became a Christian place of worship. The site remained in use until around the 4th century AD. A hermitage might have existed in the area during the medieval period.

The main structural elements of the site are:

- a rock-hewn rectangular chamber, with a number of niches in the walls
- a T-shaped rock-hewn corridor leading to the chamber
- a water reservoir and a bell-shaped well, both rock-hewn
- the remains of an external masonry structure including an altar

The masonry structure has some similarities to the remains of the Punic-Roman sanctuary at Tas-Silġ in Marsaxlokk.

== Excavations and recent history ==
The area around Ras il-Wardija was used for defensive purposes during World War II. The site was first excavated by the Missione Archaeologica Italiana a Malta (Archaeological Mission of Malta) between 1964 and 1967. The temple was well preserved until the excavations, but it has since deteriorated.

On 30 March 1988, it was discovered that an ancient graffito carved on one of the walls of the sanctuary had been stolen. The graffito was recovered in June 2011, and it is now on display at the Gozo Museum of Archaeology in the Cittadella. The graffito shows a human figure with outstretched arms, in the shape of a cross. It has been suggested that the figure represents the Punic goddess Tanit, but it might also be a medieval representation of a Christian cross.

The land on which the sanctuary is located is privately owned by George Spiteri, and permission may be required in order to access the site. It is listed on the National Inventory of the Cultural Property of the Maltese Islands.
