= National Inventory of the Cultural Property of the Maltese Islands =

Heritage register

Logo of the Superintendence of Cultural Heritage

The National Inventory of the Cultural Property of the Maltese Islands (NICPMI) is a heritage register listing the cultural property of Malta. The inventory includes properties such as archaeological sites, fortifications, religious buildings, monuments and other buildings. The NICPMI is under the responsibility of the Superintendence for Cultural Heritage (SCH), which was founded in 2002 to replace the Antiquities Act. The NICPMI was established on 16 December 2011.

According to article 7(5)(a) of the Cultural Heritage Act, 2002:

(5) It shall be the function of the Superintendence:

(a) to establish, update, manage and, where appropriate, publish, or to ensure the compilation of, a national inventory of cultural property belonging:

(i) to the State or State institutions,
(ii) to the Catholic Church and to other religious denominations,
(iii) to Foundations established in these islands,
(iv) to physical and juridical persons when the cultural property has been made accessible to the public, or when such persons have given their consent for such a purpose;

The offices of the Superintendence were located at 138, Melita Street, Valletta until 2008, and are now at 173, St. Christopher's Street, Valletta.

In the book Il-Mit Pawlin u l-Abbuż tal-Istorja Maltija (The Pauline Mythology and the Abuse of Maltese History), author Mark Camilleri criticizes the Superintendence for supporting Pauline mythology by presenting the 12th–17th centuries tales purported by Giovanni Francesco Abela as fact, and for supporting the idea that Christianity in Malta has been continuous since the supposed shipwreck in Malta, which contemporary historians such as history professor Godfrey Wettinger discredit as pseudo-history. Camilleri wrote that the Superintendent, and those responsible for the NICPMI, set aside archeological research related to the Arab period in Malta (870–1091). When requesting information of the Arab period remains in Malta, under the access to information act (based on the Aarhus Convention), the Superintendence refused to cooperate.

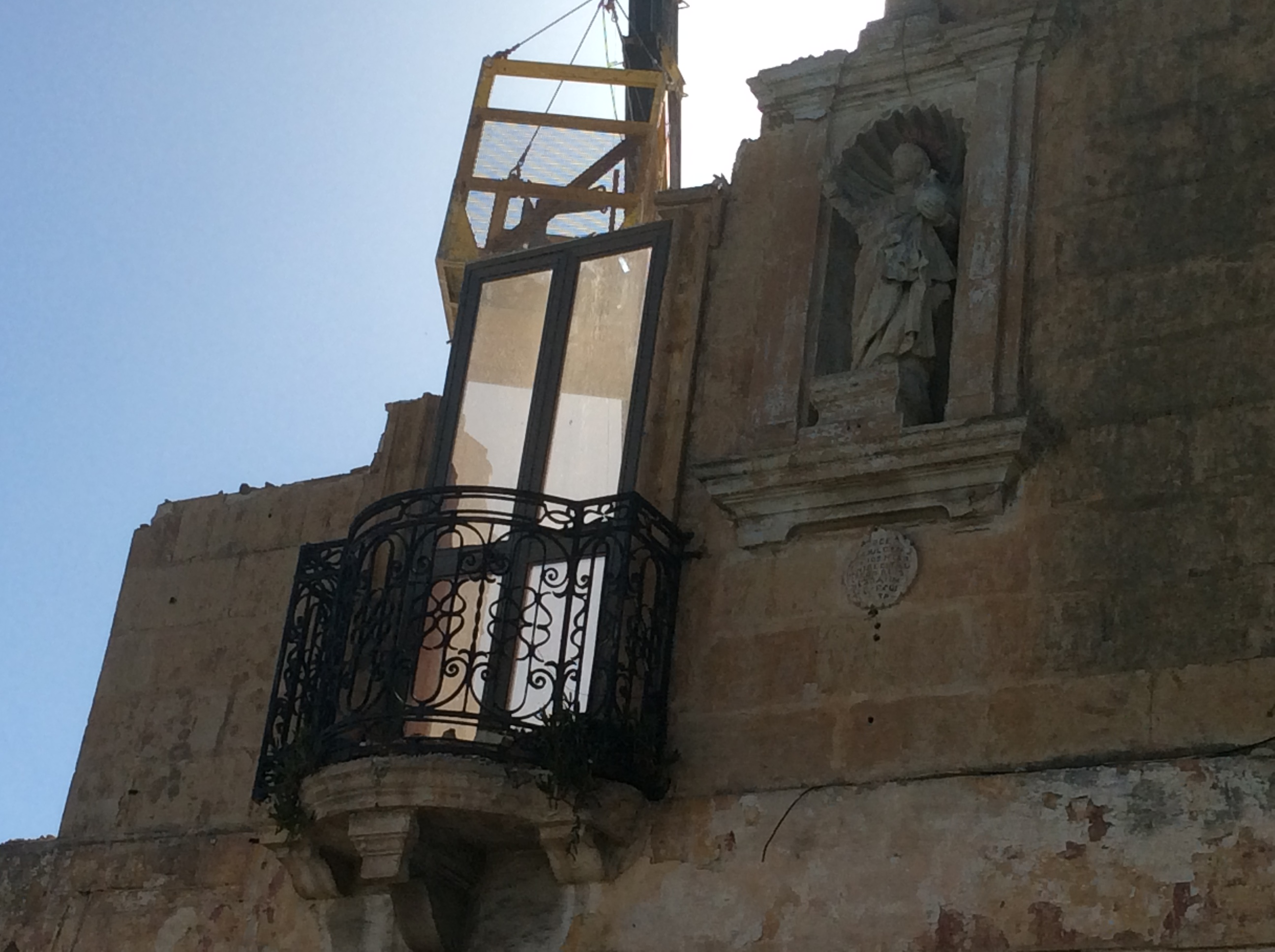
The building of a listed niche of Christ the King in Qormi was demolished in 2017.

In a report published by the Superintendence in 2016, it was made public that the list of protected inventory were not updated according to its aimed obligations. The Superintendence cited the spiral number of development application as the reason for running out of resources to update the lists. The Malta Developers Association still complains of the timing period which businesspeople have to wait for processing applications, and the costs are put on those purchasing the eventual properties in the market if approved.

Sites and buildings listed on the inventory are not necessarily protected. For example, the building that included a niche with a statue of Christ the King in Qormi, which was listed on NICPMI as number 00475, was demolished in 2017. The 2016 Development and Planning Act permits the Planning Authority to ignore the recommendations of the SCH. Significant of the listed monuments, such as churches, are under responsibility of religious groups and the Superintendence does not intervene over their decisions. The Roman Catholic Church in Malta regulated its property with established Catholic Cultural Heritage Commission.

== See also ==
- List of monuments in Malta
