= List of monuments in Nadur =

This is a list of monuments in Nadur, Gozo, Malta, which are listed on the National Inventory of the Cultural Property of the Maltese Islands.

== List ==
| Name of object | Location | Coordinates | ID | Photo | Upload |
|---|---|---|---|---|---|
| San Blas Tower | il-Qortin ta' Isopu | 36°03′20″N 14°18′33″E | 00038 | San Blas Tower | Upload Photo |
| Niche of St Mark the Evangelist | 29 Triq San Ġwann c/w Sqaq Dun Karm Caruana | 36°02′15″N 14°17′49″E | 00994 | | Upload Photo |
| Niche of the Immaculate Conception | Triq Ta' Grunju | 36°02′15″N 14°18′01″E | 00995 | Niche of the Immaculate Conception | Upload Photo |
| Niche of St Joseph | Triq Diċembru Tlettax c/w Triq iċ-Ċimċem | 36°02′17″N 14°17′46″E | 00996 | Niche of St Joseph | Upload Photo |
| Niche of the Madonna of Fatima | Triq iċ-Ċimċem | 36°02′17″N 14°17′46″E | 00997 | | Upload Photo |
| Niche of Saint Peter and Saint Paul | "Red Roses", Triq Madre' Gemma Camilleri | 36°02′16″N 14°17′43″E | 00998 | | Upload Photo |
| Niche of St Joseph | Pjazza Dun Martin Camilleri | 36°02′15″N 14°17′42″E | 00999 | Niche of St Joseph | Upload Photo |
| Relief of the Pietà | Pjazza Dun Martin Camilleri | 36°02′16″N 14°17′41″E | 01000 | Relief of the Pietà | Upload Photo |
| Niche of the Madonna of Mount Carmel | 20 Pjazza 28 ta' April 1688 | 36°02′15″N 14°17′40″E | 01001 | Niche of the Madonna of Mount Carmel | Upload Photo |
| Niche of the Madonna of Mount Carmel | Pjazza 28 ta' April 1688 c/w Pjazza San Pietru u San Pawl | 36°02′16″N 14°17′37″E | 01002 | Niche of the Madonna of Mount Carmel | Upload Photo |
| Niche of Christ the King | Triq it-Tramuntana | 36°02′17″N 14°17′39″E | 01003 | Niche of Christ the King | Upload Photo |
| Parish Church of Saint Peter and Saint Paul | Pjazza San Pietru u San Pawl | 36°02′16″N 14°17′40″E | 01004 | Parish Church of Saint Peter and Saint Paul | Upload Photo |
| Niche of the Sacred Heart of Jesus | Pjazza San Pietru u San Pawl c/w Triq Dun Bernard Haber | 36°02′16″N 14°17′35″E | 01005 | Niche of the Sacred Heart of Jesus | Upload Photo |
| Niche of the Madonna of Lourdes | 80 Triq Dun Bernard Haber | 36°02′16″N 14°17′35″E | 01006 | Niche of the Madonna of Lourdes | Upload Photo |
| Relief of St. Anne | 47 Triq L-Kappillan | 36°02′14″N 14°17′39″E | 01007 | Relief of St. Anne | Upload Photo |
| Niche of the Sacred Heart of Jesus | 94 Triq Xandriku | 36°02′12″N 14°17′42″E | 01008 | Niche of the Sacred Heart of Jesus | Upload Photo |
| Niche of the Madonna of Lourdes | 70 Triq Xandriku | 36°02′10″N 14°17′47″E | 01009 | | Upload Photo |
| Niche of the Madonna of Safe Haven | Triq Ta' Said c/w Triq iċ-Ċimċem | 36°02′21″N 14°17′49″E | 01010 | | Upload Photo |
| Niche of Saint Blaise | Triq San Blas c/w Triq Għajn Berta | 36°03′00″N 14°18′00″E | 01011 | | Upload Photo |
| Niche of St. Anthony of Padua | 12 Triq Wied Riħan | 36°02′59″N 14°18′03″E | 01012 | | Upload Photo |
| Niche of St Joseph | Triq ir-Ramla | | 01013 | | Upload Photo |
| Niche of the Sacred Heart of Jesus | "St. Paul", Triq ir-Ramla | 36°02′29″N 14°17′18″E | 01014 | | Upload Photo |
| Ramla Left Battery | Ramla Bay | 36°03′41″N 14°16′57″E | 01413 | Ramla Left Battery | Upload Photo |
| Ramla Redoubt | Ramla Bay | 36°03′41″N 14°17′03″E | 01414 | Ramla Redoubt | Upload Photo |
| Ramla Right Battery | Ramla Bay | 36°03′46″N 14°17′13″E | 01415 | Ramla Right Battery | Upload Photo |
| Ramla Underwater Barrier and remains of entrenchment | Ramla Bay | 36°03′44″N 14°17′03″E | 01416 | Ramla Underwater Barrier and remains of entrenchment | Upload Photo |
| Ramla Fougasse | Ramla Bay | 36°03′45″N 14°17′11″E | 01441 | | Upload Photo |
