= List of monuments in Għasri =

This is a list of monuments in Għasri, Gozo, Malta, which are listed on the National Inventory of the Cultural Property of the Maltese Islands.

== List ==
Name of object	Location	Coordinates	ID	Photo	Upload
Niche of the Madonna of Ta' Pinu			00987		Upload Photo
Niche of the Madonna of Mount Carmel			00988		Upload Photo
Niche of the Madonna of the Rosary			00989		Upload Photo
Niche of Christ the Nazarene			00990		Upload Photo
Parish Church of Corpus Christi			00991	Parish Church of Corpus Christi	Upload Photo
Chapel of the Patronage of the Madonna			00992	Chapel of the Patronage of the Madonna	Upload Photo
Niche of the Annunciation			00993		Upload Photo
