= Ramla Right Battery =

Artillery battery in Malta

- Batterija tal-Lemin tar-Ramla
- Nadur, Gozo, Malta
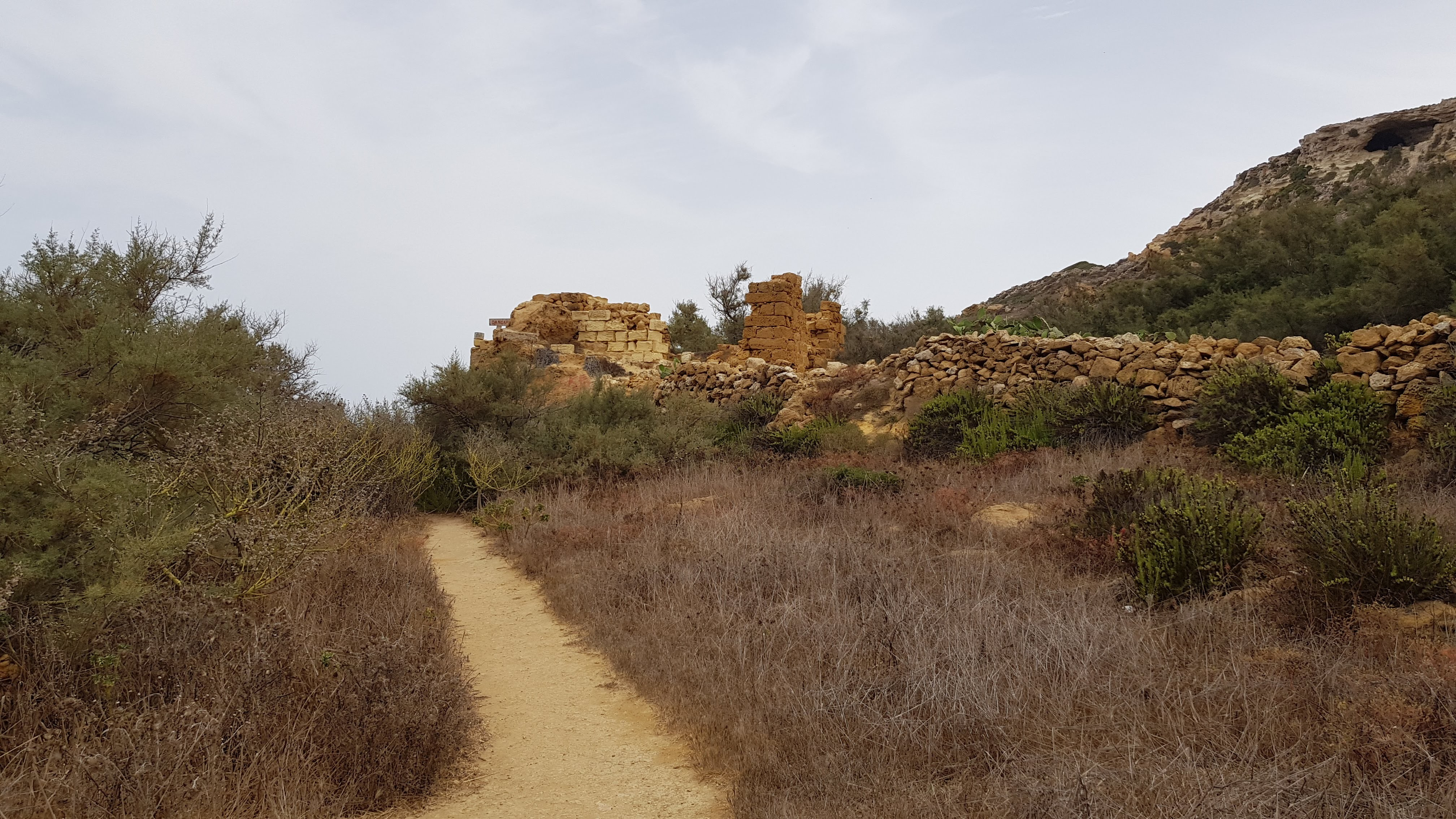
- Ruins of Ramla Right Battery

Site information
- Type: Artillery battery
- Owner: Government of Malta
- Controlled by: Gaia Foundation
- Condition: Ruins

Location
- Coordinates: 36°3′45.6″N 14°17′12.8″E

Site history
- Built: 1715–1716
- Built by: Order of Saint John
- Materials: Limestone
- Battles/wars: French invasion of Malta (1798)

Ramla Right Battery (Maltese: Batterija tal-Lemin tar-Ramla), also known as Gironda Battery (Maltese: Batterija ta' Gironda) or Nadur Battery (Maltese: Batterija tan-Nadur), was an artillery battery in Ramla Bay, in the limits of Nadur on the island of Gozo, Malta. It was built by the Order of Saint John in 1715–1716 as one of a series of coastal fortifications around the Maltese Islands. The battery now lies in ruins.

== History ==
Ramla Right Battery was built in 1715–1716 as part of the first building programme of coastal batteries in Malta. It was one of several fortifications in Ramla Bay, which also included Ramla Left Battery on the opposite side of the bay and Ramla Redoubt in the centre. These were all linked together by an entrenchment wall. Ramla Bay was further defended by Marsalforn Tower on the plateau above the bay, and an underwater barrier to prevent enemy ships from landing within the bay.

The battery had a semi-circular parapet with six embrasures, with a blockhouse at the rear. A fougasse, dug on the shore close to the battery, still exists.

The battery saw use during the French invasion of Malta in 1798, when it fired on the approaching French fleet.

== Present day ==
Only some remains of the battery's blockhouse survive and, along with the rest of Ramla Bay, are managed by the Gaia Foundation.
