= Mistra Rocks =

Coastline in Nadur, Gozo, Malta

Coordinates: 36°03′32″N 14°18′36″E

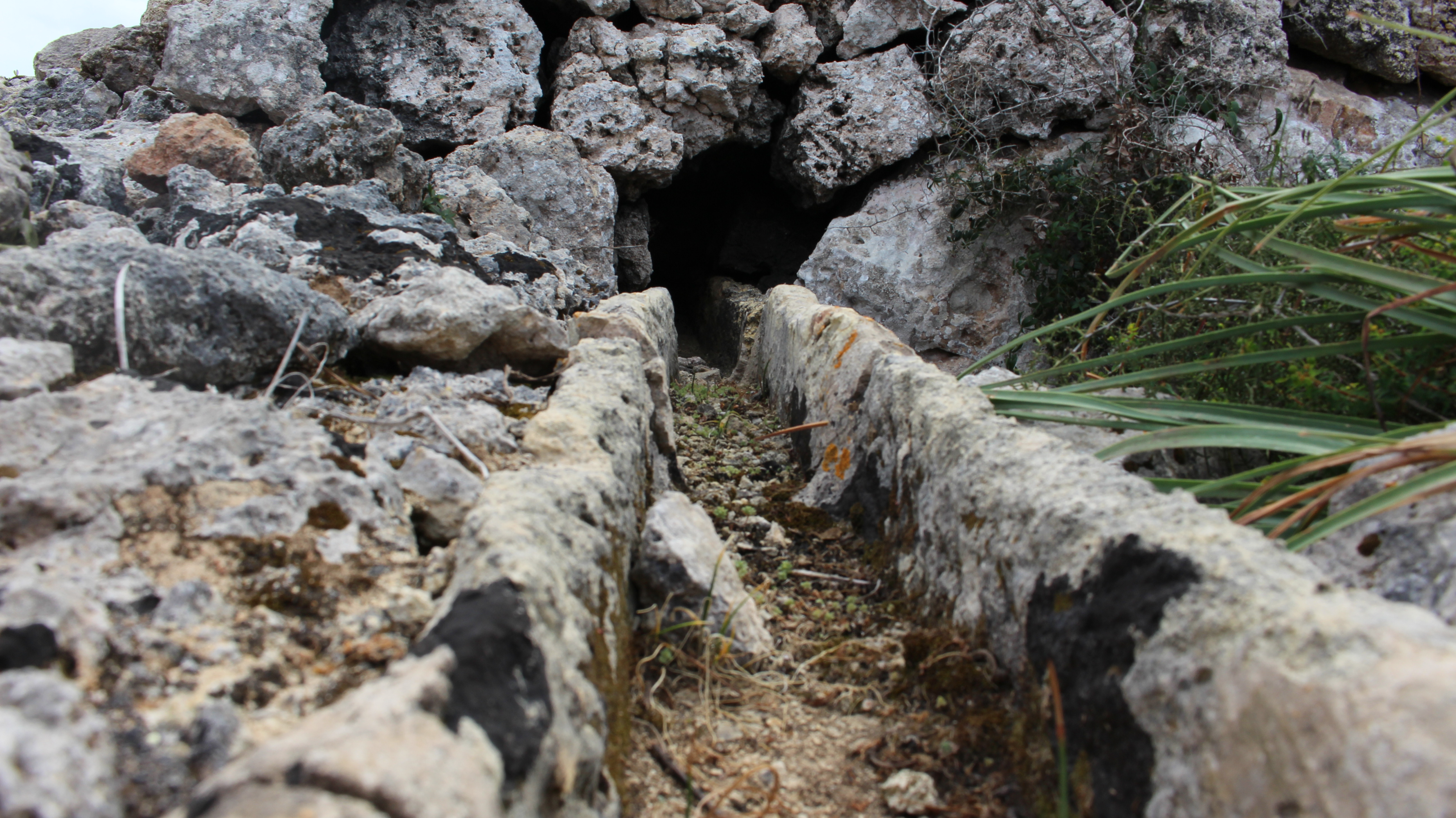
Water canals were an effective way of transporting water

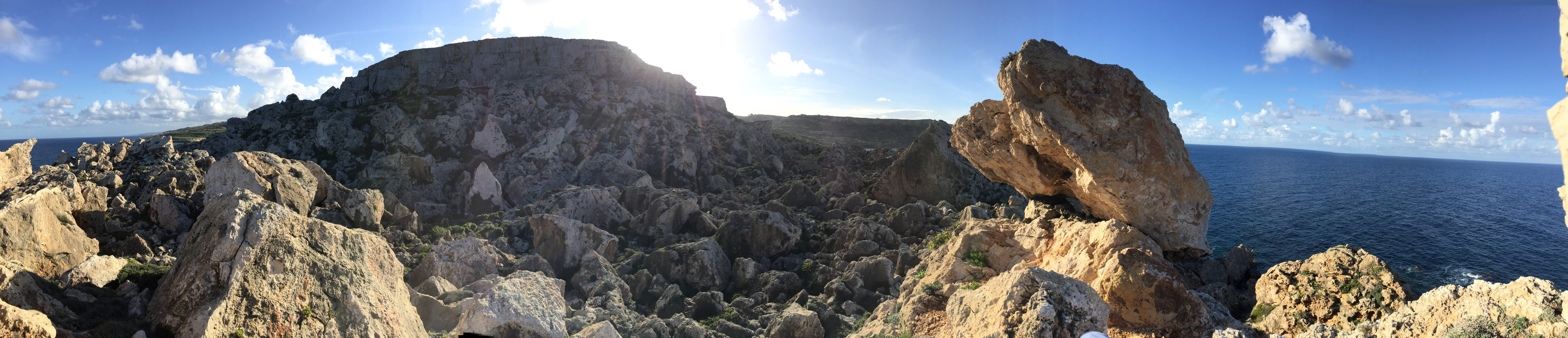
The natural labyrinth that is Mistra Rocks.

Mistra Rocks' (literally meaning "mysterious place" or "hidden rocks") is a coastline stretching from San Blas Bay to Riħan Valley in Nadur, Gozo, Malta. It is a naturally occurring rubble rocky area at the site of the ta' Sopu Tower. It has an endangered ecosystem being the niche of a number of species, such as wild shrubs and small animals. The geographical area has a rough terrain, making it difficult to access other than on foot. Remains of Maltese rubble walls and water canals, built over a hundred years ago, are taken as primarily evidence that until recent human activity took place for agricultural purposes. Some stretches of land were used as a quarry, but other than that the area was not altered by man-made intervention. Huge rocks, some the size of small houses, pile over each other forming deep talus 'caves'. The area is considered a walker's paradise for visitors, even if so safety precautions should be taken in consideration when visiting, preferably with the assistance of locals.
