= List of shipwrecks in April 1883 =

The list of shipwrecks in April 1883 includes ships sunk, foundered, grounded, or otherwise lost during April 1883.

== 2 April ==
List of shipwrecks: 2 April 1883
Ship	State	Description
James Garfield	United Kingdom	The schooner was abandoned in the North Sea. All five people on board were rescued by the schooner Adagio (Germany). James Garfield was on a voyage from Ipswich, Suffolk to the Shetland Islands.

== 3 April ==
List of shipwrecks: 3 April 1883
Ship	State	Description
Nebo	United Kingdom	The steamship departed from Sunderland, County Durham for Bombay, India. Presumed subsequently foundered with the loss of all 26 crew.
Reddies	United Kingdom	The schooner collided with the steamship Courland and sank off Point Lynas, Anglesey. Her crew were rescued by Courland. Reddies was on a voyage from Garston, Lancashire to Youghal, County Cork.

== 4 April ==
List of shipwrecks: 4 April 1883
Ship	State	Description
Three unnamed vessels	United Kingdom	Three overladen barges became total wrecks while loading sand from Swanpool beach, Falmouth, Cornwall in a strong easterly breeze.

== 5 April ==
List of shipwrecks: 5 April 1883
Ship	State	Description
Brooklyn	United Kingdom	The steamship was driven ashore at Portland, Maine, United States. She was on a voyage from Portland to Liverpool, Lancashire.
Panama	United Kingdom	The barque was abandoned in the Atlantic Ocean (40°20′N 57°38′W). Her crew were rescued by the barque Havdyst (Norway). Panama was on a voyage from Saint John's, Newfoundland Colony to Greenock, Renfrewshire.

== 7 April ==
List of shipwrecks: 7 April 1883
Ship	State	Description
Vesuv	Denmark	The steamship collided with the steamship Contest (United Kingdom) and sank off Spurn Point, Yorkshire, United Kingdom. Her crew were rescued by Contest. Vesuv was on a voyage from Glasgow, Renfrewshire to Hull, Yorkshire. She was refloated on 24 April and beached at "Burcam".

== 8 April ==
List of shipwrecks: 8 April 1883
Ship	State	Description
Unnamed	Flag unknown	The burning ship sank in the Atlantic Ocean, witnessed by the steamship Wydale (United Kingdom).

== 10 April ==
List of shipwrecks: 10 April 1883
Ship	State	Description
Dorcas	United Kingdom	The steamship ran aground at Romsø, Denmark and sank. She was on a voyage from South Shields, County Durham to Kiel, Germany.
Esperanza	France	The schooner ran aground at Cádiz and was wrecked. She was on a voyage from Gibraltar to Seville.

== 11 April ==
List of shipwrecks: 11 April 1883
Ship	State	Description
Geo. W. Wylly	United States	The steamship struck the pier of a bridge at Fort Gaines, Georgia and sank in the Chattahoochee River with the loss of thirteen lives.
War Hawk	United States	The clipper ship caught fire at Port Discovery, Washington. Her crew cut her loose to save the Port Discovery Mill from catching fire. She drifted out in to Discovery Bay and sank. Plans to salvage her copper hull sheathing were made in 1919.

== 12 April ==
List of shipwrecks: 12 April 1883
Ship	State	Description
Hebe	United Kingdom	The barque was abandoned in the Atlantic Ocean (49°13′N 8°36′W). Her crew were rescued by America (Flag unknown). Hebe was on a voyage from Ayr to Demerara, British Guiana.
Reinbeck	United Kingdom	The steamship ran aground at Porto, Portugal and became severely leaky. She was on a voyage from Newport, Monmouthshire, United Kingdom to Constantinople, Ottoman Empire.
Wylley	United Kingdom	The steamboat struck the pier of a bridge and sank in the Chattahoochee River at Eufala, Alabama with the loss of twelve lives.

== 13 April ==
List of shipwrecks: 13 April 1883
Ship	State	Description
Trader	United Kingdom	The ship ran aground off the Leasowe Lighthouse, Cheshire, broke her back and was wrecked. She was on a voyage from Runcorn, Cheshire to Inverness.

== 14 April ==
List of shipwrecks: 14 April 1883
Ship	State	Description
Débutante	France	The schooner was run into by the steamship James Turpie (United Kingdom) and sank off Penarth Head, Glamorgan, United Kingdom. Her crew survived. Débutante was on a voyage from Cardiff, Glamorgan to Vannes, Morbihan.

== 17 April ==
List of shipwrecks: 17 April 1883
Ship	State	Description
British Enterprise	United Kingdom	The ship was run into by the steamship Warkworth (United Kingdom) and sank in the River Tyne. She was refloated on 7 July.

== 18 April ==
List of shipwrecks: 18 April 1883
Ship	State	Description
Caroline	United Kingdom	The schooner collided with another vessel and was beached at the Mumbles, Glamorgan.
Valetta	United Kingdom	The steamship was abandoned in the Atlantic Ocean (47°35′N 51°12′W. Her crew were rescued. She was on a voyage from Cardiff, Glamorgan to Saint John's, Newfoundland Colony, Canada or from Halifax, Nova Scotia to Boston, Massachusetts, United States. She subsequently came ashore and was wrecked at Liverpool, Nova Scotia, Canada.

== 19 April ==
List of shipwrecks: 19 April 1883
Ship	State	Description
Magdalena Vicenta	Spain	The steamship collided with the steamship Thames (United Kingdom) and sank at the entrance to the port of Bilbao. Six out of eleven people on board lost their lives. Two or four of the crew of Thames were also reported lost.

== 20 April ==
List of shipwrecks: 20 April 1883
Ship	State	Description
Dragoon	United Kingdom	The steamship ran aground at Maassluis, South Holland, Netherlands. She was on a voyage from Newcastle upon Tyne, Northumberland to Rotterdam, South Holland.
Prince of Wales	United Kingdom	The brig was driven ashore near Mazagan, Morocco. She subsequently became a wreck.

== 22 April ==
List of shipwrecks: 22 April 1883
Ship	State	Description
Silver	Germany	The schooner was wrecked near Skerryvore. Her crew were rescued. She was on a voyage from Liverpool, Lancashire, United Kingdom to Arkhangelsk, Russia.

== 24 April ==
List of shipwrecks: 24 April 1883
Ship	State	Description
British Commerce	United Kingdom	The full-rigged ship collided with the full-rigged ship County of Aberdeen (United Kingdom) and sank in the English Channel off the Owers Lightship ( Trinity House) with the loss of 25 of her 27 crew. Survivors were rescued by County of Aberdeen. British Commerce was on a voyage from London to Melbourne, Victoria.
Earl of Dumfries	United Kingdom	The steamship collided with the steamship Abrota (Flag unknown) and ran aground at Kertch, Russia. She was refloated and resumed her voyage.
Louis Napoleon	United Kingdom	The ship sank off the Mull of Galloway, Wigtownshire. Her four crew were rescued by the steamship Talisman (United Kingdom).

== 25 April ==
List of shipwrecks: 25 April 1883
Ship	State	Description
Julius Cæsar	Sweden	The steamship was damaged by fire at Danzig, Germany.

== 26 April ==
List of shipwrecks: 26 April 1883
Ship	State	Description
City of Exeter	United Kingdom	The steamship caught fire at Huelva, Spain and was scuttled. She was refloated.
Frederick	United Kingdom	The smack foundered in the English Channel 8 nautical miles (15 km) south south west of The Needles, Isle of Wight. Her crew survived. She was on a voyage from Guernsey, Channel Islands to Portsmouth, Hampshire.
Winthorpe	United Kingdom	The steamship was in collision with the steamship Tregenna (United Kingdom) at Constantinople, Ottoman Empire. Winthorpe was severely damaged and was beached.

== 28 April ==
List of shipwrecks: 28 April 1883
Ship	State	Description
Galera	United Kingdom	The barque ran aground on the Goodwin Sands, Kent and was severely damaged. She was on a voyage from London to Trinidad. She was refloated with the assistance of three tugs and was towed back to London in a severely leaky condition.

== 29 April ==
List of shipwrecks: 29 April 1883
Ship	State	Description
Grappler	(Canada)	The steamship caught fire and sank off Vancouver Island, British Columbia, Canada, with much loss of life. There were 36 survivors. She was on a voyage from Puget Sound, Washington Territory, to the Department of Alaska.

== 30 April ==
List of shipwrecks: 30 April 1883
Ship	State	Description
Annie Richmond	United States	The schooner was driven ashore and wrecked on Santa Rosa Island, Florida.
Arrow	United States	The schooner was wrecked in Lake Michigan 3 1/2 nautical miles (6.5 km) north east of Rawley's Point, off Two Rivers, Wisconsin (44°15.316′N 087°30.898′W). She was on a voyage from Milwaukee, Wisconsin to Leland, Michigan.

== Unknown date ==
List of shipwrecks: Unknown date in April 1883
Ship	State	Description
Asie	France	The steamship was wrecked on Marmara Island, Ottoman Empire.
Baron Ardrossan	United Kingdom	The steamship ran aground on the wreck of the steamship James W. Barber (Belgium) off Cape Fontana, Russia. Baron Ardrossan was on a voyage from Rangoon, Burma to Odesa, Russia.
Baxian	United Kingdom	The ship was wrecked at Antonina, Brazil. Her crew were rescued. She was on a voyage from Antonina to Valparaíso, Chile.
Breeze	France	The fishing vessel was wrecked on the coast of Iceland. Her crew were rescued.
City of Merida	United States	The steamship collided with another vessel off Cape Hatteras, Virginia and was beached. She was on a voyage from the West Indies to New York.
Consul Lund	Sweden	The schooner foundered in the North Sea before 10 April. She was on a voyage from Grimsby, Lincolnshire, United Kingdom to Norrköping.
Eduard	Germany	The barque was destroyed by fire at sea before 5 April. Her crew were rescued by Argo (Flag unknown). Eduard was on a voyage from Liverpool, Lancashire, United Kingdom to Punta Arenas, Chile.
Fama	United States	The ship ran aground on the Brandywine Shoals, off the coast of New Jersey.
Granville	United Kingdom	The barque was wrecked at "Papado", Chile. Her crew were rescued.
Hutton Chaytor	United Kingdom	The steamship ran aground off "Patagoras", Argentina and was damaged. She was refloated and towed in to San Blas Bay. She was on a voyage from Newcastle upon Tyne, Northumberland to Valparaíso, Chile.
Italy	United Kingdom	The steamship was damaged by fire at New York.
John Dory	United Kingdom	The smack was driven ashore and wrecked near Glenarm, County Antrim. Her crew were rescued. She was on a voyage from Belfast, County Antrim to Port Dundas, Renfrewshire.
Lepanto	United States	The barque was abandoned in the Atlantic Ocean before 26 April.
Louis Gilles	France	The schooner foundered in the Atlantic Ocean. All on board were rescued by the brigantine Edith (France). Louis Gilles was on a voyage from Saint-Malo, Ille-et-Vilaine to Saint-Pierre, Saint Pierre and Miquelon.
Marie Louise	France	The schooner foundered off Cayenne, French Guiana before 12 April. She was on a voyage from Hamburg, Germany to Cayenne.
Regard	United Kingdom	The schooner ran aground at the mouth of the Rio Grande and was beached at "Eetrite", Brazil. She was on a voyage from the Rio Grande to Falmouth, Cornwall.
Sierra Palma	United Kingdom	The barque foundered at sea before 24 April. All on board were rescued She was on a voyage from Rangoon, Burma to Liverpool.
Roker	France	The fishing vessel was wrecked on the coast of Iceland. Her crew were rescued.
Roland	France	The brig was abandoned in the Atlantic Ocean. Her 21 crew were rescued by the steamship France (Flag unknown).
St. Elmo	United Kingdom	The brigantine ran aground in the Magdalena River at Barranquilla, United States of Colombia. She was on a voyage from Barranquilla to Colon. She was refloated but consequently foundered. Her crew survived.
Venezuelan	United Kingdom	The steamship was driven ashore at New York. She had been refloated by 14 April.
Vigilant	France	The fishing vessel was wrecked on the coast of Iceland. Her crew were rescued.
