= The Last Supper (Pisani) =

Painting by Lazzaro Pisani

- Maltese: L-Aħħar Ċena
- The titular painting in the choir of the parish church in Għasri
- Artist: Lazzaro Pisani
- Subject: The Last Supper of Our Lord
- Location: Parish Church of Corpus Christi, Għasri
- Owner: Corpus Christi Parish

The Last Supper is a painting depicting the Lord's Supper created by Lazzaro Pisani. It is currently the titular altarpiece of the Parish Church in Għasri dedicated to the Institution of the Eucharist.

== Painting ==
The painting was commissioned by the Rev. Fr. Carmelo Caruana, curator of the church, and vice parish priest. The painting was put in place in 1917. The decorator Antonio Agius is responsible for the frame, which was done a year later. This, and his other works in the parish church are considered to be his climax.

The stone sculptures at the bottom of the frame were removed when the walls of the chancel were covered in marble (see right).

== Restoration ==
By 2007, due to the weight of the canvas itself, creases were forming in the painting and it was getting unstuck from its frame. BOV sponsored the restoration. The restoration was carried out by Emanuel Zammit, from Żejtun following his other works in the Cathedral of the Assumption in Gozo.
