= Lazzaro Pisani =

Maltese painter

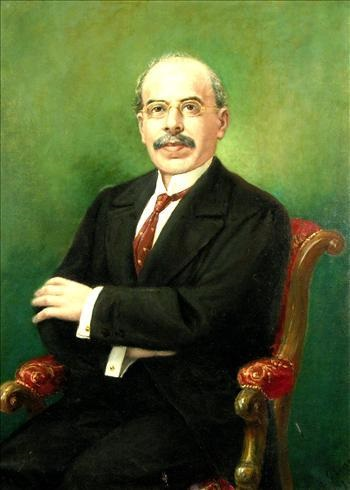
- Self-portrait by Pisani (1916)
- Born: 15 December 1854; Żebbuġ, Crown Colony of Malta
- Died: 31 August 1932 (aged 77); St. Paul's Bay
- Education: Michele Bellanti and Carlo Ignatio Cortis
- Alma mater: Accademia di San Luca; British Academy of Arts in Rome
- Notable work: Ceiling of Basilica of St Peter and St Paul, Nadur

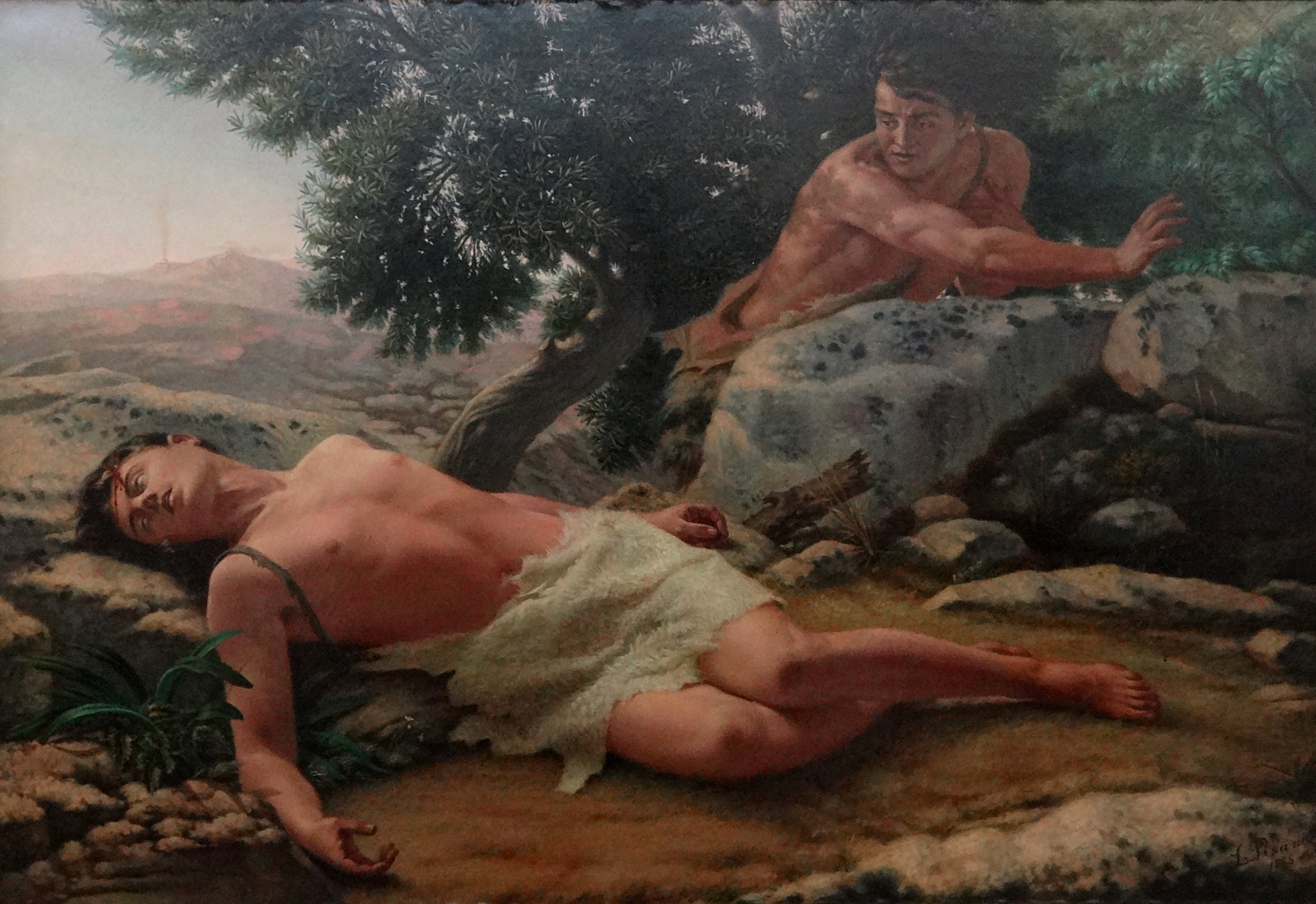
Death of Abel, 1885, by Lazzaro Pisani.

Lazzaro Pisani (15 December 1854 – 31 August 1932) was a Maltese painter who was born in Żebbuġ. He is considered to be one of the most important Maltese artists of the late 19th and early 20th centuries.

== Biography ==
Pisani studied in Rome at the Accademia di San Luca but returned to Malta in 1874 after contracting malaria. He received a financial award from the Malta Society of Arts, Manufactures and Commerce. In 1885, Pisani was awarded a silver medal at the Colonial Exhibition in London for his work the Death of Abel. He won another silver medal at the Colonial Exhibition of 1924.

Pisani died at St. Paul's Bay. At the time of his death he was working on frescos in the churches of Siggiewi and Mġarr which he left unfinished.

The artist's daughter, Maria Rosa Lazzaro, bequeathed a collection of eleven of her father's paintings to Heritage Malta in 2008 which were exhibited between 15 January – 25 March 2008. The exhibition also included a catalogue published on the occasion which was written by the art historian Lino Borg.

== Works ==
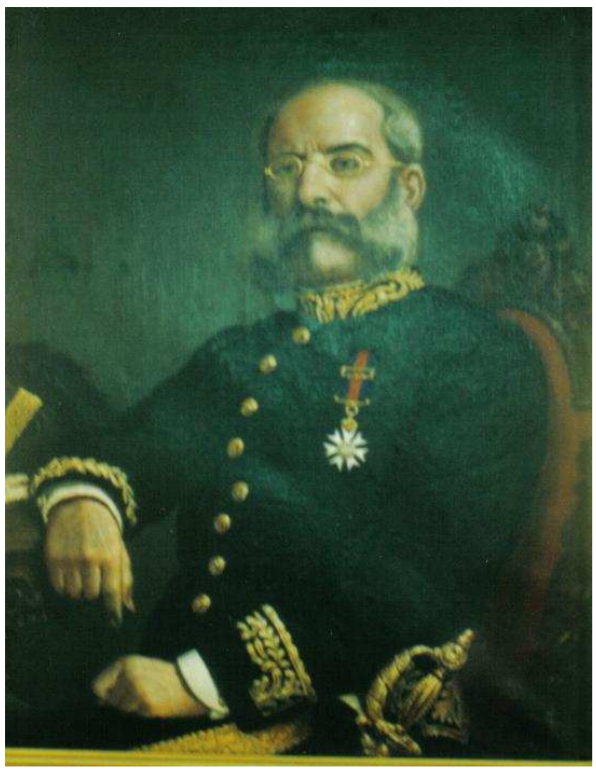
Portrait of Salvatore Luigi Pisani

- Death of Abel (oil on canvas, 1885), National Museum of Fine Arts, Malta, won Pisani a silver medal at the Colonial Exhibition in London in 1885.
- Basilica of St Peter and St Paul, Nadur ceiling, comprises more than 150 canvases attached to the vaulted ceiling.
- The Beatitudes, Siġġiewi Parish Church dome, comprises eight marouflages - one of these detached from the church dome in 2013; conservation work started 1 May 2014.
- The Last Supper, Corpus Christi Church, Għasri, Gozo, restored through sponsorship by the Bank of Valletta in 2007
- The Madonna of the Rosary, Church of Jesus of Nazareth, Sliema
- Portrait of Concetta Pisani, 1916
- Self-portrait of the artist, 1916
- Portrait of Mary Pisani
- Our Lady of Sorrows, 1924
- Portrait of Mrs. Gauci, 1907
- Portrait of Roby Pisani
- St. Dismas
- Portrait of Lady Edeline Strickland
- Portrait of Pietro Paolo Mompalao
- The Letter
- Portrait of Judge Sir Salvatore Naudi
