= Ramla Redoubt =

Remains of Redoubt in Gozo, Malta

- Ridott tar-Ramla
- Xagħra, Gozo, Malta
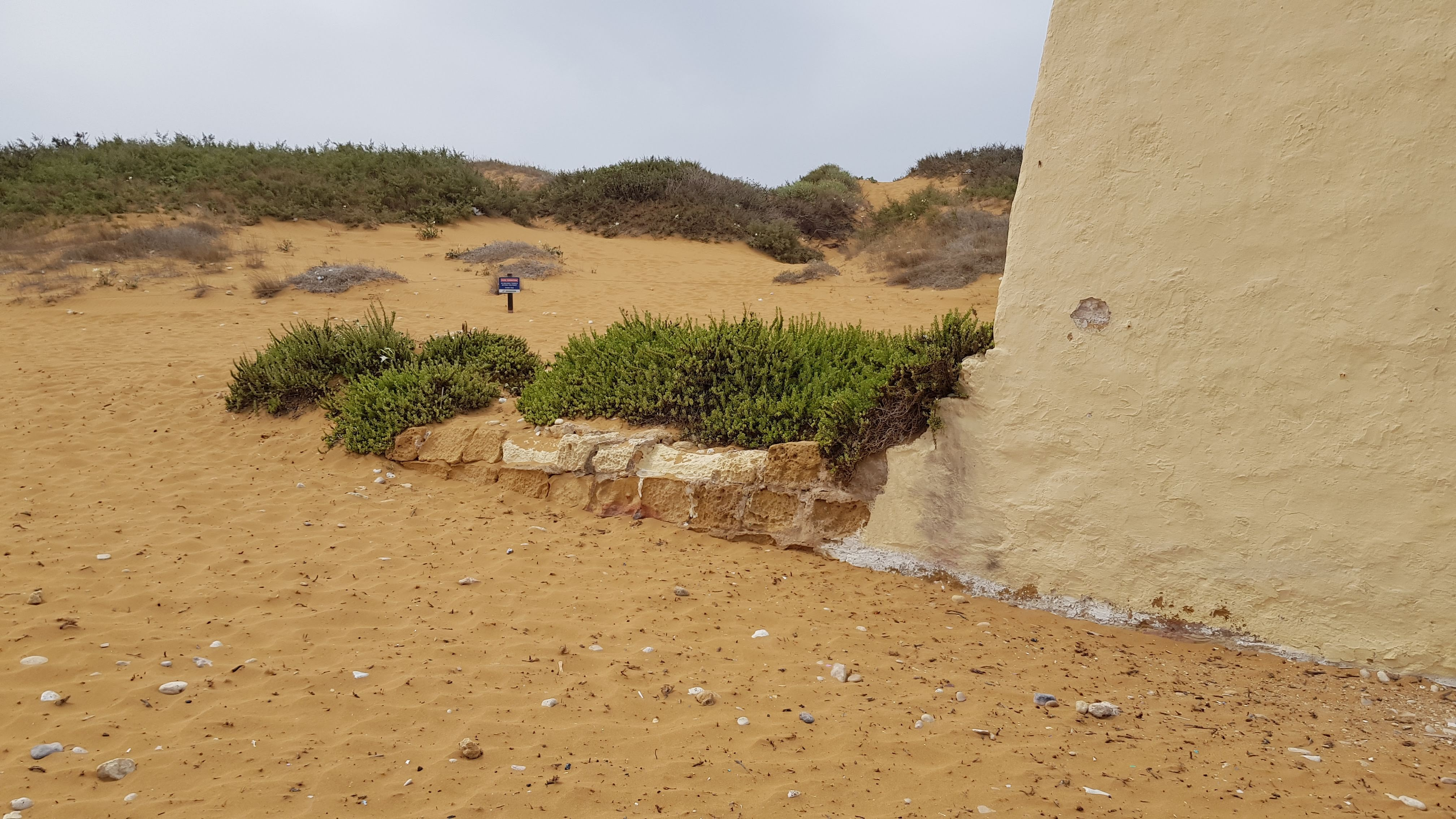
- Remains of the Ramla Redoubt

Site information
- Type: Redoubt
- Owner: Government of Malta
- Controlled by: Gaia Foundation
- Condition: Some foundations survive

Location
- Coordinates: 36°3′41.3″N 14°17′3″E

Site history
- Built: 1715–1716
- Built by: Order of Saint John
- Materials: Limestone

Ramla Redoubt (Maltese: Ridott tar-Ramla), also known as Vendôme Redoubt (Maltese: Ridott ta' Vendôme), was a redoubt in Ramla Bay, within the limits of Xagħra on the island of Gozo, Malta. It was built by the Order of Saint John in 1715–1716 as one of a series of coastal fortifications around the Maltese Islands. The redoubt no longer exists, but a small part of its foundations are still visible.

== History ==
Ramla Redoubt was built in 1715–1716 as part of the first building programme of coastal batteries and redoubts in Malta. It was located in the centre of Ramla Bay. The bay included other fortifications, namely Ramla Left Battery and Ramla Right Battery on either side of the bay, and an entrenchment wall linking both batteries with the redoubt. Ramla Bay was further defended by Marsalforn Tower on the plateau above the bay, and an underwater barrier to prevent enemy ships from landing within the bay.

The redoubt originally consisted of a pentagonal platform with a low parapet. A rectangular blockhouse was located at the centre of its gorge.

In 1881, a statue of the Madonna was built on the site of the redoubt.

== Present day ==
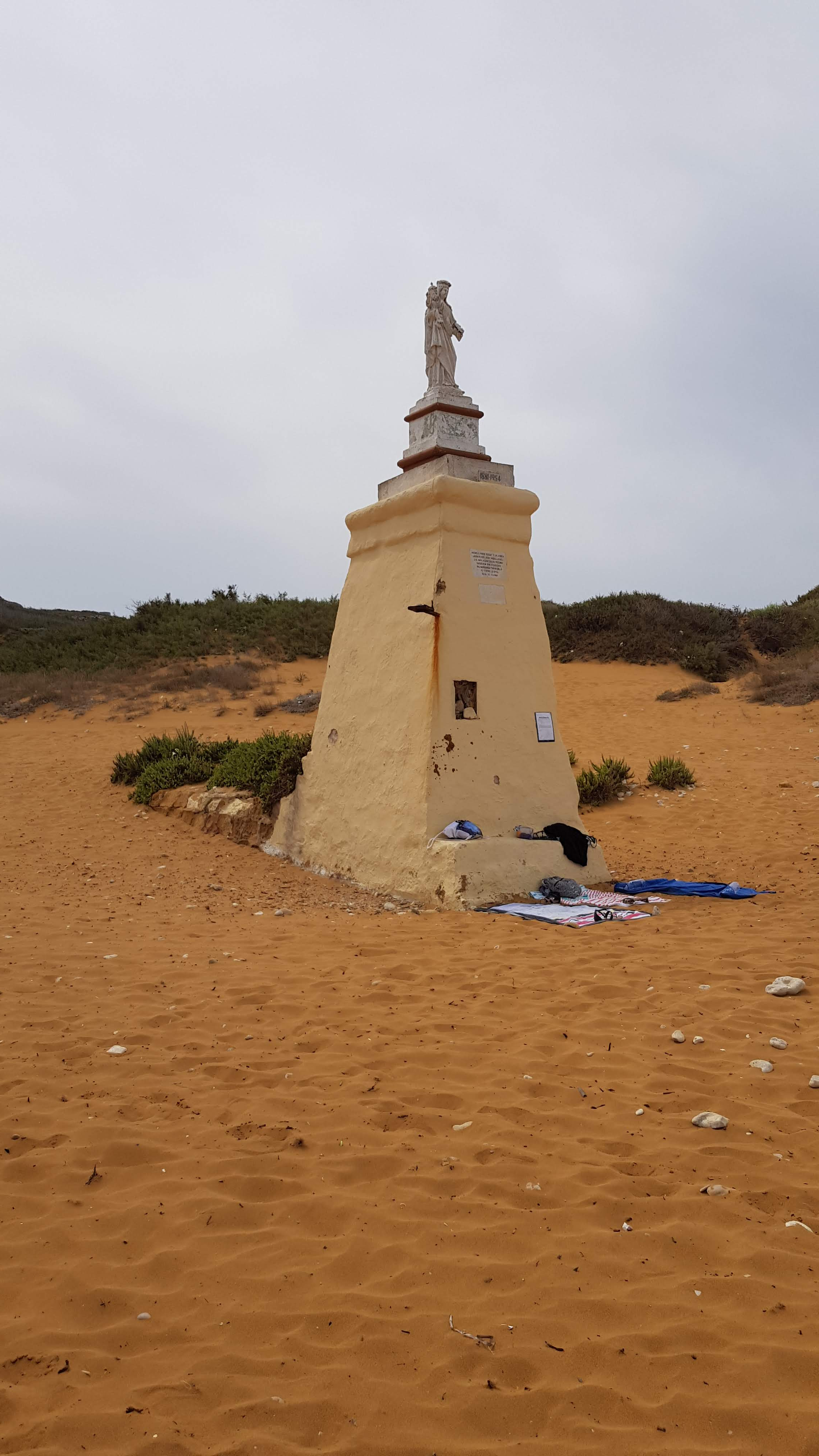
Statue of Our Lady on the site of the redoubt

Today, all that remains of the redoubt is a small section of its pentagonal platform near the base of the 19th century statue. These remains, along with the rest of Ramla Bay, are managed by the Gaia Foundation.
