= Ramla Left Battery =

Former military battery in Gozo, Malta

- Batterija tax-Xellug tar-Ramla
- Xagħra, Gozo, Malta
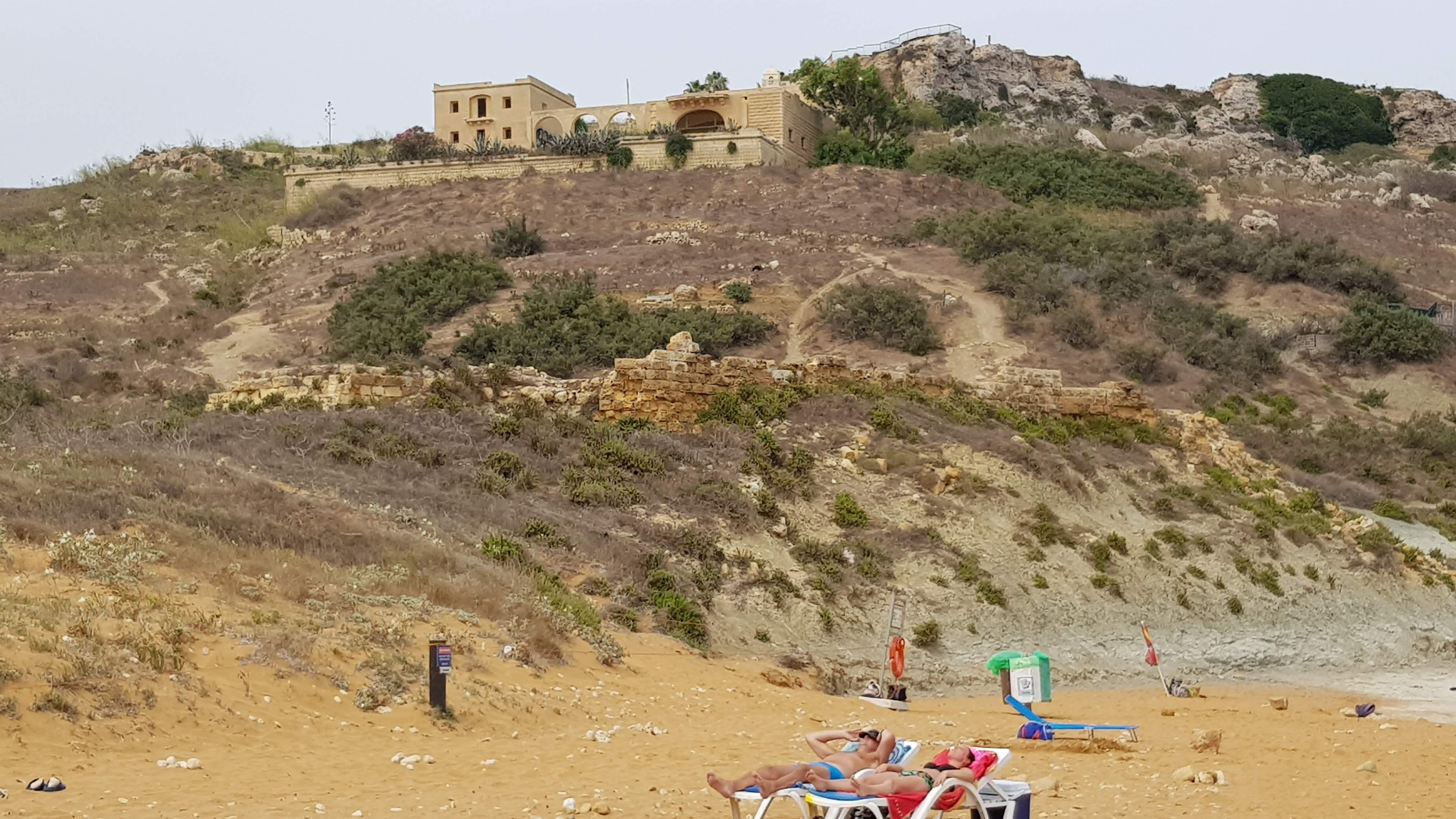
- Ruins of Ramla Left Battery (centre)

Site information
- Type: Artillery battery
- Owner: Government of Malta
- Controlled by: Gaia Foundation
- Condition: Ruins

Location
- Coordinates: 36°3′40.5″N 14°16′56.3″E

Site history
- Built: 1715–1716
- Built by: Order of Saint John
- Materials: Limestone
- Battles/wars: French invasion of Malta (1798)

Ramla Left Battery (Maltese: Batterija tax-Xellug tar-Ramla), also known as Belancourt Battery (Maltese: Batterija ta' Belancourt) or Xagħra Battery (Maltese: Batterija tax-Xagħra), was an artillery battery in Ramla Bay, within the limits of Xagħra on the island of Gozo, Malta. It was built by the Order of Saint John in 1715–1716 as one of a series of coastal fortifications around the Maltese Islands. The battery now lies in ruins.

== History ==
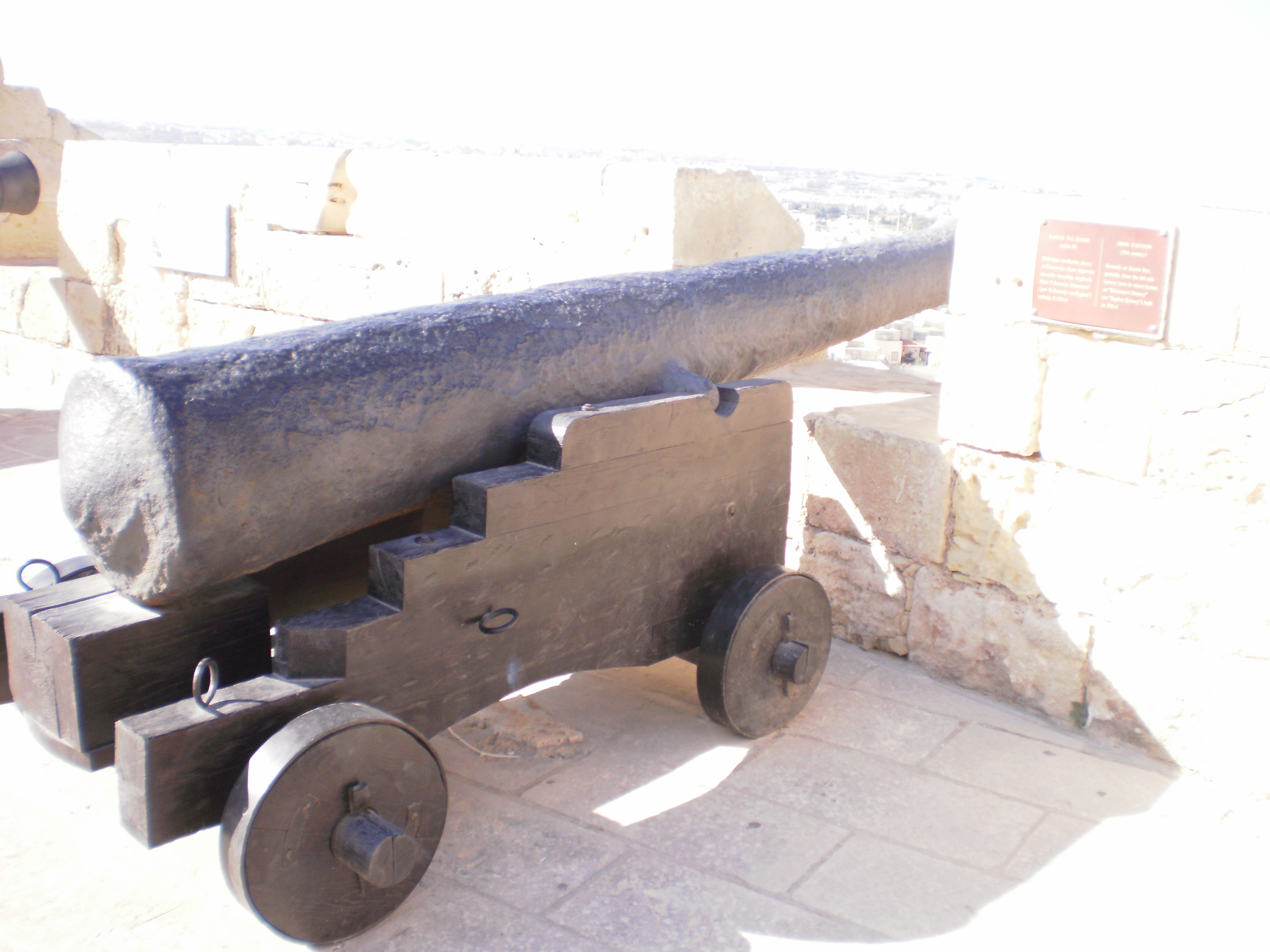
An iron cannon, originally located at Ramla Left Battery, now found at the Cittadella

Ramla Left Battery was built in 1715–1716 as part of the first building programme of coastal batteries in Malta. It was one of several fortifications in Ramla Bay that also included Ramla Right Battery on the opposite side of the bay and Ramla Redoubt in the centre. These were all linked together by an entrenchment wall. Ramla Bay was further defended by Marsalforn Tower on the plateau above the bay, and an underwater barrier to prevent enemy ships from landing within the bay.

The battery originally had an irregularly shaped gun platform with a parapet having six embrasures. A small blockhouse was located at the rear of the battery. Construction cost around 295 scudi.

The battery saw use during the French invasion of Malta in 1798, when it fired on the approaching French fleet.

== Present day ==
Today, all that remains of the battery are some ruins. These ruins, along with the rest of Ramla Bay, are managed by the Gaia Foundation.

At least one iron cannon from the battery is now placed at the Cittadella.
