= Daħlet Qorrot =

Bay in Malta

Coordinates: 36°03′01″N 14°19′01″E

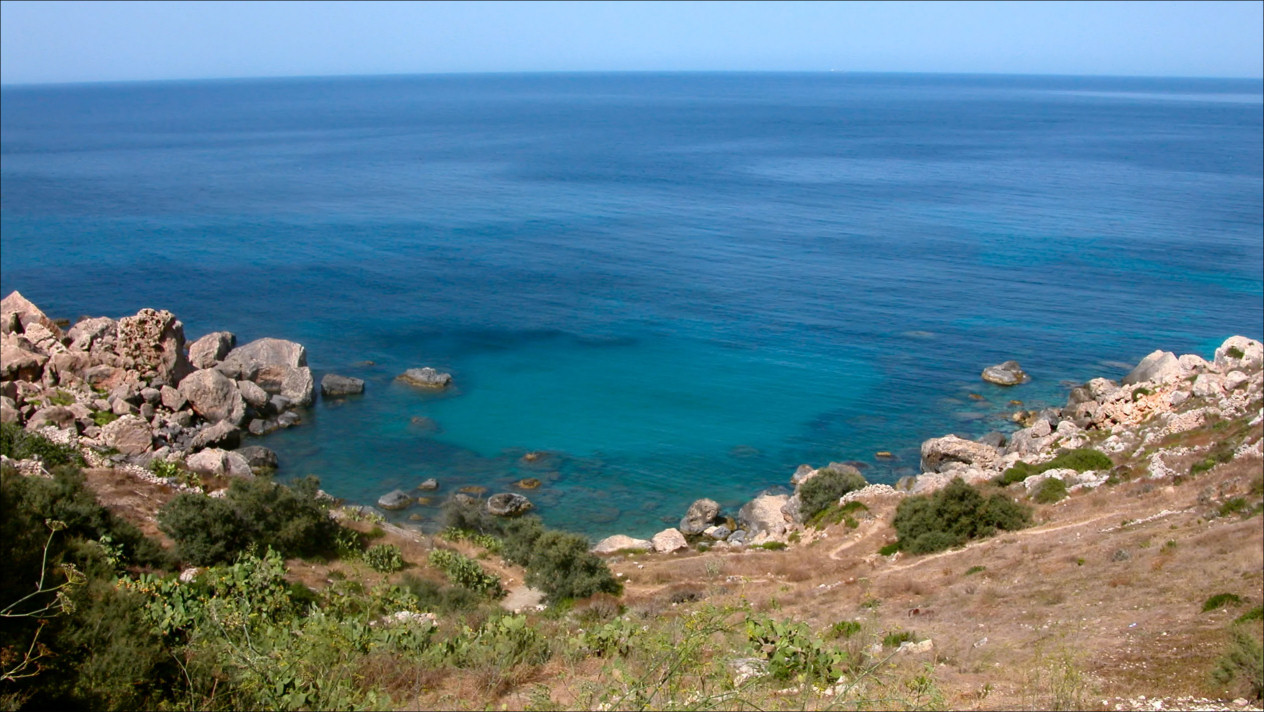
Saint Philip's bay (close to Daħlet Qorrot)

Daħlet Qorrot is a small bay found in the north of Gozo, Malta between Qala and Nadur. The beach is rocky in summer but in winter it is always covered with algae. In this bay, you can find several boathouses which had been dug in the soft limestone. The rock is filled with fossils and this makes Daħlet Qorrot a geological hot spot.

It derives its name from the ship "Qorrot" that entered the bay to take shelter from the storm, back in the 19th century. The word 'daħlet' in Maltese comes from the noun 'daħla' meaning "entry, entrance or an inlet/creek". The -et comes from the fact that feminine nouns in a constructive state (as is typical of old Maltese place names) will show its t marbuta.

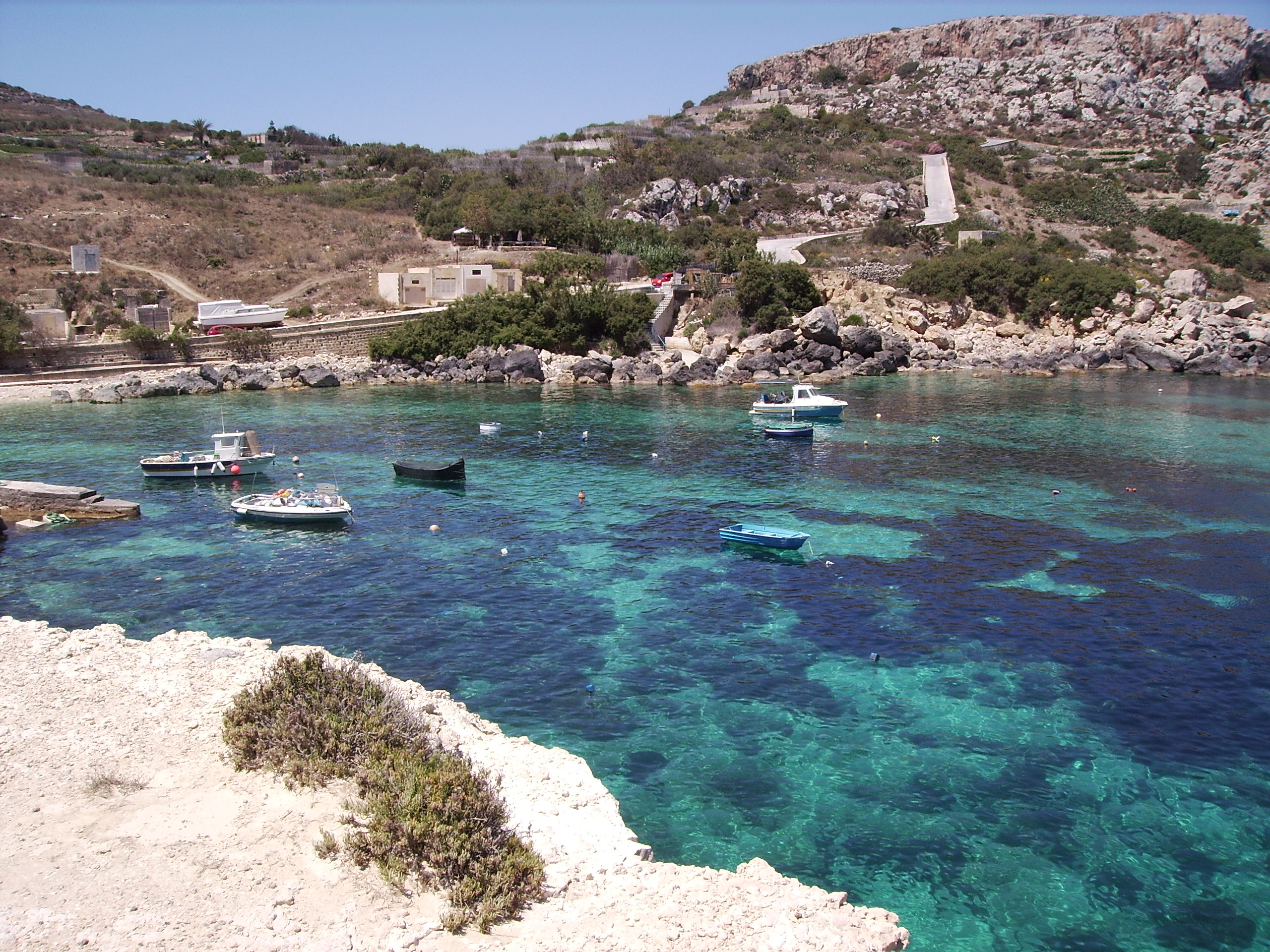
Fishing boats and boathouses are common in this bay.
