= Salvatore Luigi Pisani =

Maltese doctor

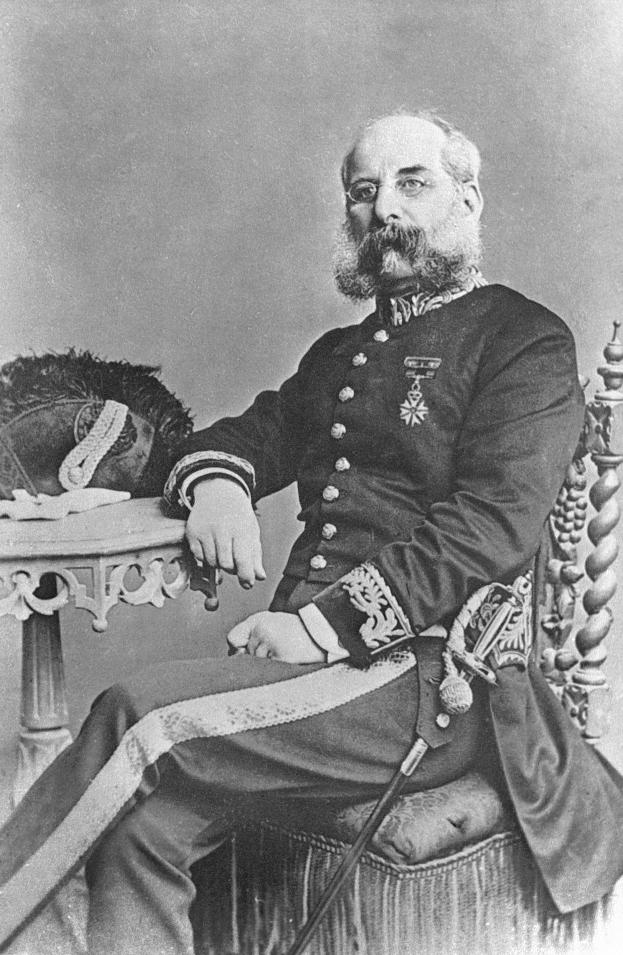
Pisani in 1902

Salvatore Luigi Pisani CMG, MD (27 May 1828, in Birgu – 27 October 1908, in Zejtun) was a Maltese doctor, renowned professor of anatomy, surgery, midwifery and gynaecology.

== Biography ==
The only son of Luigi Pisani and Concetta Inglott, Salvatore Luigi Pisani was born in a family of physicians. His homonymous grandfather had died in the plague of 1813. His father was superintendent of the Gozo Hospital, and later of the Central Hospital in Floriana from 1850 to 1865, when he died of typhoid fever, probably contracted on the job. Pisani was particularly impressed by the cholera epidemics that had struck Malta in 1837 and 1850, and dedicated his years of study to the causes of the disease.

Pisani studied at the Lyceum and graduated as M.D. from the University of Malta (1850) and the University of Edinburgh (1853). The same year he obtained a Licentiate and a diploma in midwifery at the Royal College of Surgeons. The first Maltese to graduate at that Edinburgh, he was awarded a gold medal and commended for his thesis 'On the Epidemics of Cholera in Malta and Gozo.' To complete his studies, he also visited several medical centres in London, Paris, Berlin, Vienna, and Italy. In May 1854, he became a member of the German Medical Society in Paris.

During the Crimean War Pisani, then in charge of the Pembroke regiment of the Military Medical Department, volunteered as surgeon with the British Army and was posted to Scutari and then Balaclava where he worked with Florence Nightingale. Impressed by his work on the battlefield, she felt obliged to write to the Governor of Malta to praise his skills and dedication.

Returning to Malta on sick leave in early 1855, Pisani was appointed medical officer in charge of the St Julian's camp. He left the British Army in July 1856, with the most solid reputation. For the following thirty years, Pisani served as specialist accoucher and surgeon at Malta's Government Hospital, in particular pioneering the practice of ophthalmology, a field in which he worked closely with his graduate Lorenzo Manché.

Then 30 years old, in 1858 Pisani was appointed to the chairs of anatomy and histology (1858-1875], midwifery and gynaecology (1858-1869), and surgery (1869-1885) at the University of Malta. Pisani devised the curriculum of the new School of Practical Midwifery, established in 1860, lecturing in English and Italian and promoting the use of the Maltese language to educate paramedics.

In 1874, Pisani published a paper in Paris entitled 'Mortality from Cholera Morbus at Malta during the epidemics of 1837 and 1850'.

In 1878 Pisani supported the then resident commissioner of National Education in Ireland, Patrick Joseph Keenan, which the British Government had sent to Malta to enquire into the state of the local education system. Keenan and Pisani pleaded for the government not to close down the University of Malta, as had been proposed, and to support the Medical School.

In 1885, Pisani was appointed to the new post of Chief Government Medical Officer, the highest-ranked medical practitioner on the island, and the following year received a bronze medal at the Malta Exhibition for two pamphlets in Maltese, 'Fuq il-mard tat-tfal' and 'Twissijiet fuq il-mard tal-kollra'. In 1887 he drafted a comprehensive report on that year's cholera outbreak, including a brief history of previous cholera epidemics in Malta and Gozo, post-mortem examination results and a description of the isolation of the cholera bacillus by Joseph Caruana Scicluna and David Bruce. Pisani noted three causal factors of the epidemics: the cholera germ, a contaminated environment, and climatic conditions conducive to the growth of the microbe. He recommended the government to improve local public health standards, in particular as concerns clean water supply, well-sanitised buildings for the working class, and extending the sewage system to rural areas.

In 1895 Pisani was also appointed as head of the new Public Health Department. The same year, in appreciation to his lifelong service, Pisani was appointed by Queen Victoria as Companion of the Most Distinguished Order of St Michael and St George (CMG), a distinction never bestowed on any other Maltese doctor. He retired in 1902, with the appreciation of then Governor Lord Grenfell.

Pisani used to live at 33 Strada Alessandro, Valletta, which he then bequeathed to his cousin Giovanna Manche who had just married Prof. Col. Lorenzo Manche in 1870. Pisani constructed Villa Sans Souci in Marsaxlokk in the 1870s. He lived at "his commodious and comfortable Villa Sans Souci situated in a lovely spot between Casal Zeitun and Marsascirocco where he quietly passed away on October 27, 1908, after a somewhat prolonged illness. The funeral cortege offered an unmistakable proof of the high esteem in which Prof. Pisani was held, comprising as it did, the elite of society, a good many following the hearse in carriages from Sans Souci to the Addolorata Cemetery, where many more joined the procession".

== Works ==
Pisani's publications included "Ktieb il Qabla" [Malta, 1883]; "Twissijiet fuq il mard tal-korla" [Malta, 1885]; "Fuq il mard tat-tfal u kif nilghulu" [Malta, 1885]; ad "Report on the Cholera Epidemic in the year 1887" [Malta, 1888]. In 1896 he initiated a series of annual public health reports.

Pisani was also a renowned numismatic and art collector, publishing "Medagliere di Malta e Gozo dall'epoca Fenicia all'attuale Regnante S.M. La Regina Vittoria" [Malta, 1896] and bequeathed his coin and medal collection (worth tens of thousands of pounds) to the Monetarium of the National Museum in 1899.

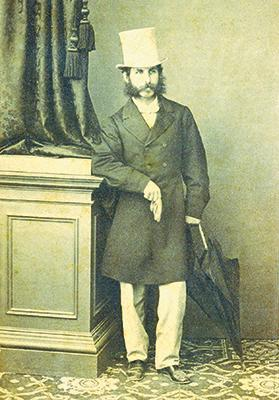
Pisani in 1844, upon enrolment at University (photo G.Micallef)

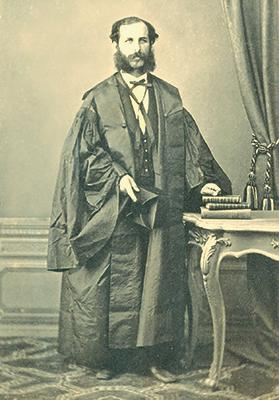
Pisani in 1850, upon graduation (photo Leandro Preziosi)

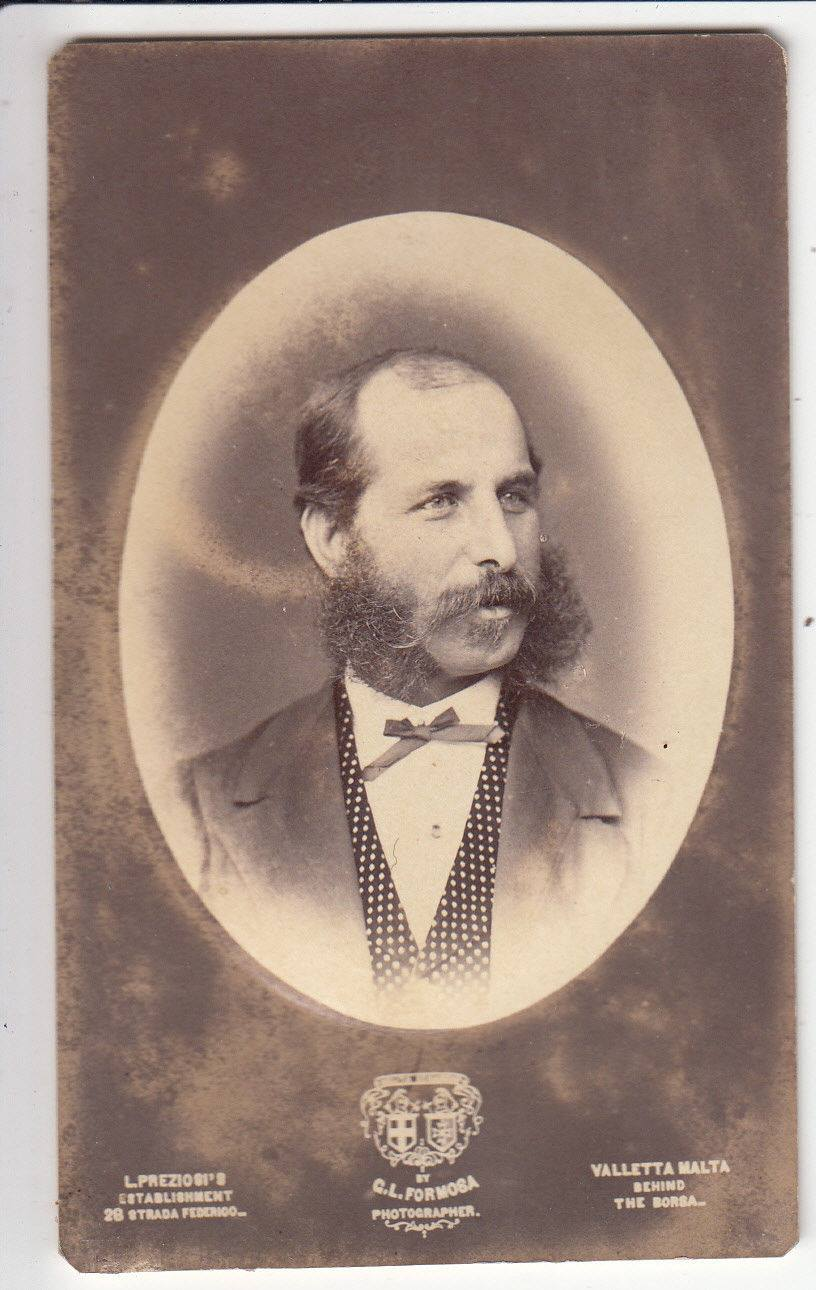
Dr Pisani, ca. 1880

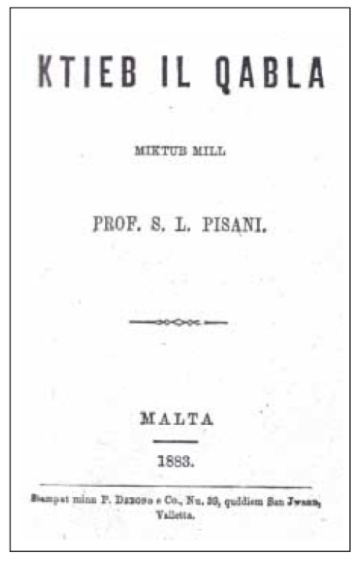
Ktieb il Qabla, 1883

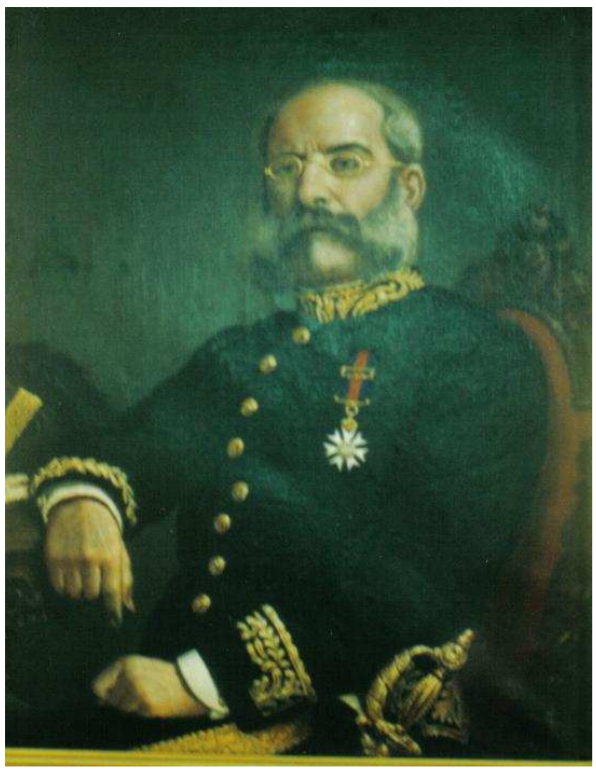
Portrait by Lazzaro Pisani, 1909

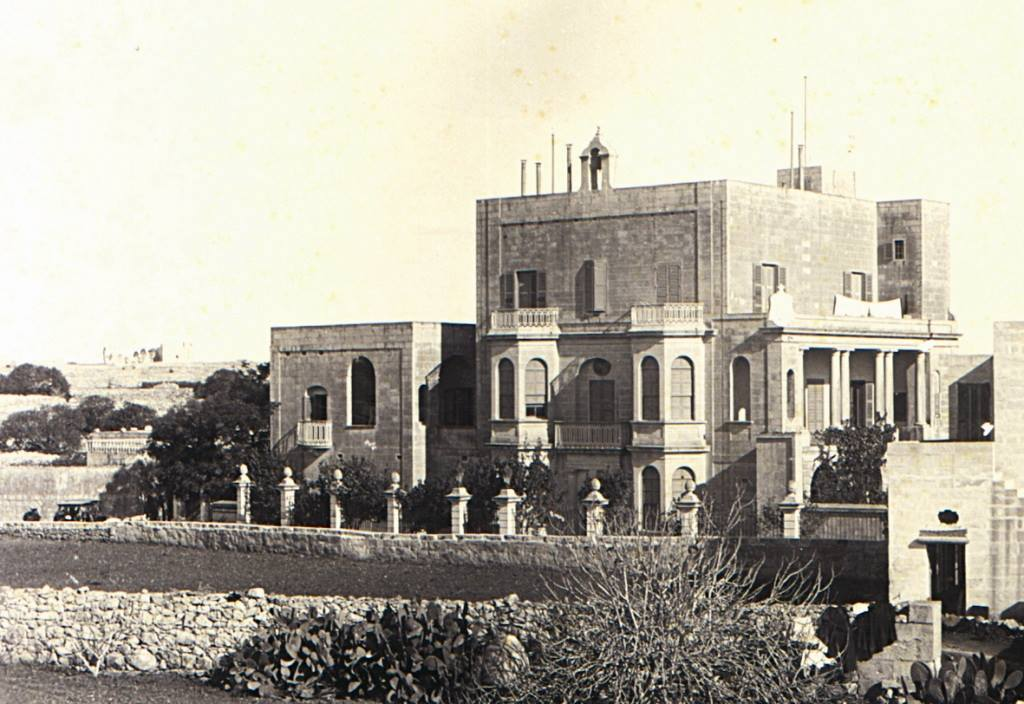
Villa Sans Souci in Zejtun/Marsaxlokk

== Bibliography ==
- C. Savona-Ventura: Pisani, Salvatore Luigi. Maltese biographies of the twentieth century [eds. M.J. Schiavone; L.J. Scerri].
- PIN, Malta, 1997, p. 455; Portraits at the Medical School. Maltese Medical Journal, 1998, VIII[1]:p. 48. Public Opinion, 28 May 1895
- "A Maltese medicine man who was 19th century icon" by Louis Borg Manche in the Sunday Times of Malta of 26 October 2008.
