= Għasri Valley =

Sea canyon in Malta

- Wied il-Għasri
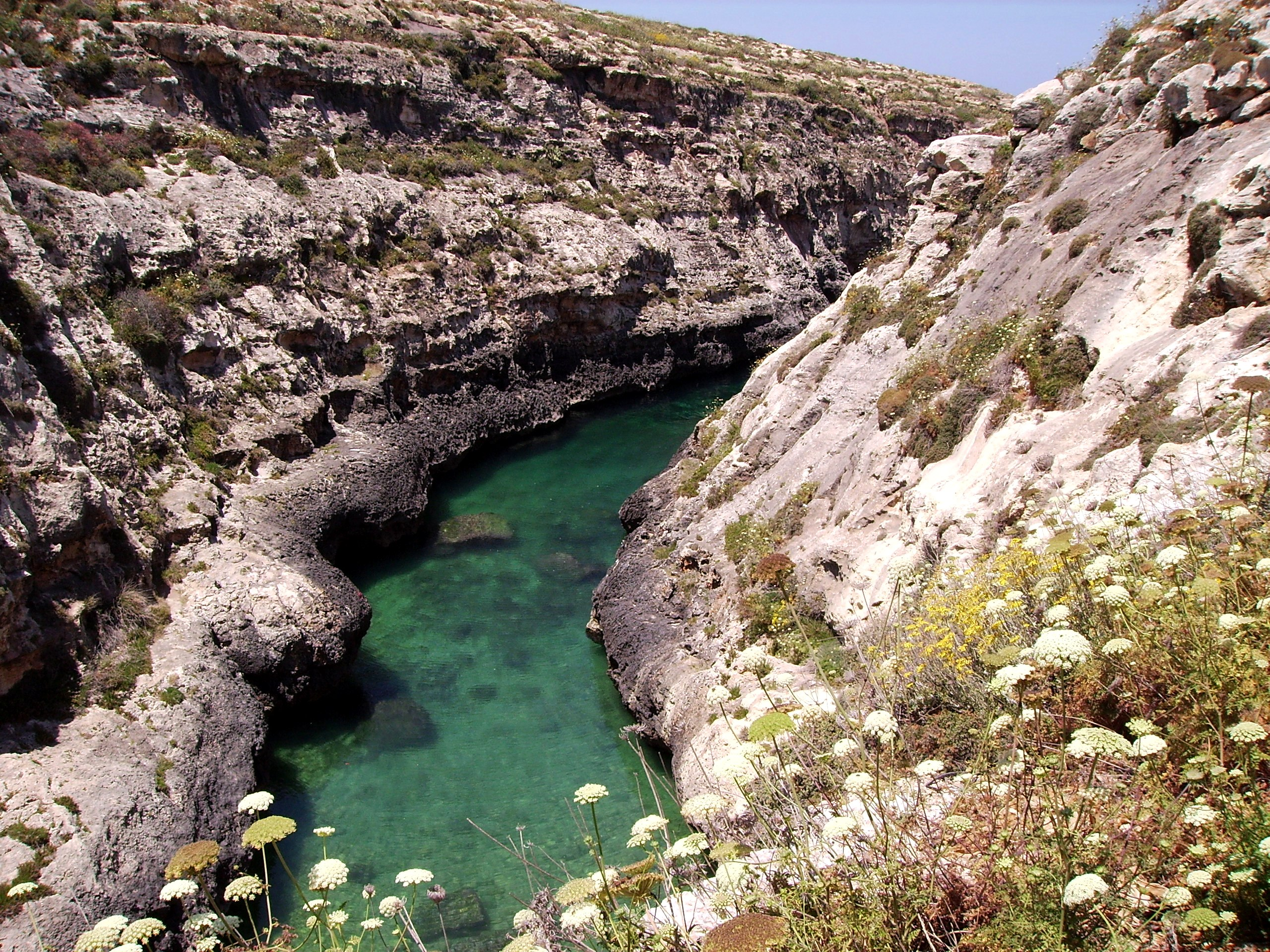

- Location within Malta
- Floor elevation: 26.84 m (88.1 ft)
- Length: 0.6 km (0.37 mi)
- Width: 0.08 km (0.050 mi)
- Area: 1.65 km^{2} (0.64 mi^{2})

Geography
- Location: Gozo, Malta.
- Coordinates: 36°4′44″N 14°13′42″E
- Interactive map of Għasri Valley

Għasri Valley (Maltese: Wied il-Għasri) is a sea canyon on the Maltese island of Gozo. The gorge continues on the land towards the village of Għasri. The valley is known for its quiet beach, which is 300 metres (980 ft) inland from the sea. The sea is only accessible via a narrow cove with high cliffs on both sides. On the edge of the valley, next to an underwater cave, it is commonly believed that Maltese salt pans were built and maintained. It contains a secluded beach which is popular with tourists and divers alike.

== History ==
In the 18th century, the inner part of Wied il-Għasri was owned by a Maltese clockmaker who decided to dig a well in a cave entrance in the sea, creating what is known today as Għar il-Qamħ (transl. Grain Cave).
