= Basilica of the Patronage of Our Lady =

Basilica of Our Lady of Patronage
- Bażilika tal-Madonna tal-Patroċinju; Il-Kappella tal-Wied (Maltese)
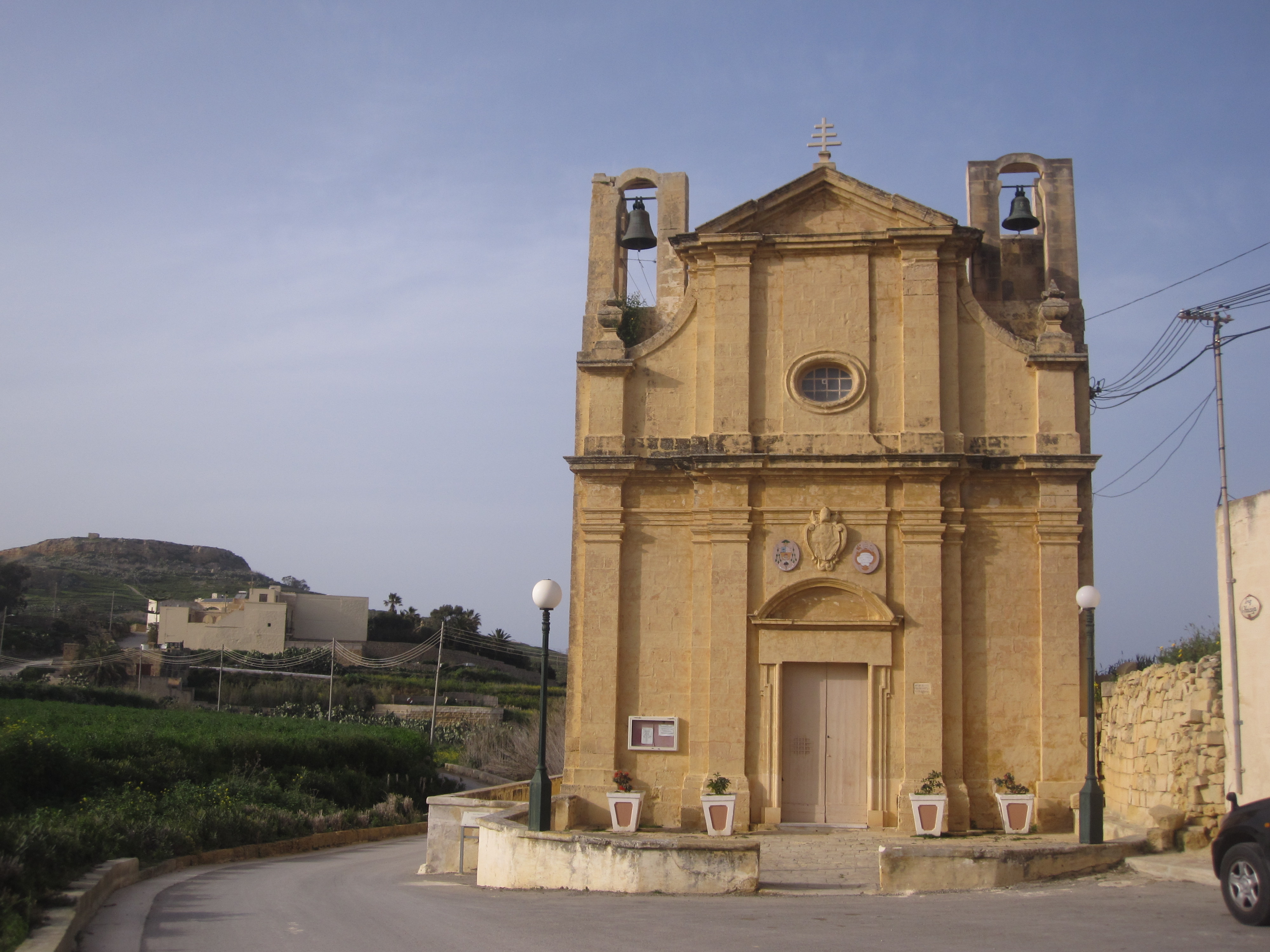
- The façade of the basilica

- Location in Malta
- 36°03′55″N 14°13′35″E
- Location: Għasri, Gozo, Malta
- Country: Malta
- Denomination: Catholic

History
- Status: Minor basilica (served as vice-parish church when Għasri was raised to status of vice-parish)
- Dedication: Our Lady of Patronage

Architecture
- Functional status: Church (served as vice-parish church when Għasri was raised to status of vice-parish)
- Architectural type: Vernacular

Administration
- Parish: Għasri Parish

Clergy
- Rector: Rev. Dr. Dominic Sultana

The Basilica of Our Lady of Patronage is a small countryside church located in Wied il-Għasri, Malta.

The facade of the chapel has four pillars in the Doric style, which hold up the two-storey building. Two small bell towers (one old, and one built in 2004) house three bells between them. The Basilica has a cupola without a lantern.

== The first church ==
The present site of the church was previously occupied by another as early as 1530, as documented by the historian Achille Ferris. This small chapel that was in place was dedicated to the Assumption of Mary and was built by the Cini family, the descendants of whom live in Żebbuġ.

In 1657, during a pastoral visit, the chapel was declared unfit for purpose, as it was unkempt and abandoned. The chapel was then rebuilt some time in the 18th century.

== The second church ==
In 1656, Pope Alexander VII gave Mary the title of Our Lady of Patronage. This title was then declared a universal devotion by Pope Benedict XIII. There is evidence that the devotion spread to Gozo so much so that the new church built between 1737 and 1739 and consecrated on May 8, 1739, was dedicated to its present title.

The builder and financial sustainer was the Rev. Thomas Saliba, whose family still lives in the village of Għasri. A pastoral visit in 1744 described the church as a long hall with a roof resting on five arches. The door looked southwards and one altar was made of precious alabaster. The main altarpiece portrayed the Blessed Virgin wearing a mantle, with which she was covering a man. The altarpiece is still in use today and was painted by a local artist from Senglea.

Later on, the sacristy was added, as well as other works of art, and a benefice to support the maintenance of the chapel.

== The third church ==
By 1750, the area surrounding the church was becoming more populated, and the chapel itself was place of pilgrimage. Thus, Rev. Saliba requested that the Grandmaster of the Order of St John give him a larger piece of land on which a bigger church could be built. The document granting him permission was received in March 1752. The new building was consecrated on 5 October 1754, while the present altar was consecrated by H.E. Vincenzo Labini in 1789.

== Minor basilica ==
The church of Our Lady of Patronage was elevated to dignity of minor basilica, and affiliated with Santa Maria Maggiore by Pope Clement XIII in 1768. This made the church the first basilica in Gozo.

Confirmation of this was given on March 7, 2004, after research in the Vatican Archives by the then-rector the Rev. Mgr Joseph Zammit.

In 1872, the area was raised to vice-parish (under the parish of Żebbuġto better administer to the pastoral needs of the people. The chapel served as vice parish church until a new parish was established in 1921 with the newly built church serving as parish church.

== List of rectors ==
Rectors of the basilica
	Name	Term began	Term ended	Notes
1	Dun Tumas Saliba	1768	21 Nov 1776	
2	Dun Ġużepp Schembri	1776	19 Jan 1821	
3	Dun Mikiel Bonavia	1821	10 Apr 1825	
4	Dun Mikiel Grima	1825	18 Mar 1849	
5	Dun Mikiel Micallef	1849	16 Mar 1893	
6	Dun Mikiel Bugeja	1893	7 Jun 1907	
7	Dun Ġużepp Galea	22 Oct 1911	13 Jan 1925	
8	Dun Ġorġ Vella	1925	18 Oct 1926	
9	Dun M'Anġ Grima	1927	23 Feb 1929	While serving as parish priest.
10	Dun Salv Scicluna	1929	17 Apr 1937	While serving as parish priest.
11	Dun Franġisk Mercieca	1937	22 May 1938	While serving as parish priest.
12	Dun Manwel Xerri	1938	5 Sep 1948	While serving as parish priest.
13	Dun Ġużepp Borg	1948	17 Jun 1951	While serving as parish priest.
14	Dun Karm Vella	1951	2 Mar 1965	While serving as parish priest.
15	Dun Ġwann Cini	1965	20 Nov 1966	While serving as parish priest.
16	Rev. Mons. Ġużepp Zammit	1966	-	
11	Rev. Mons. Dr Edward Xuereb	-	2021	While serving as parish priest.
12	Rev. Dr Dominic Sultana	2021	-	While serving as parish priest.
