= Nadur =

Nadur In-Nadur
- Local council
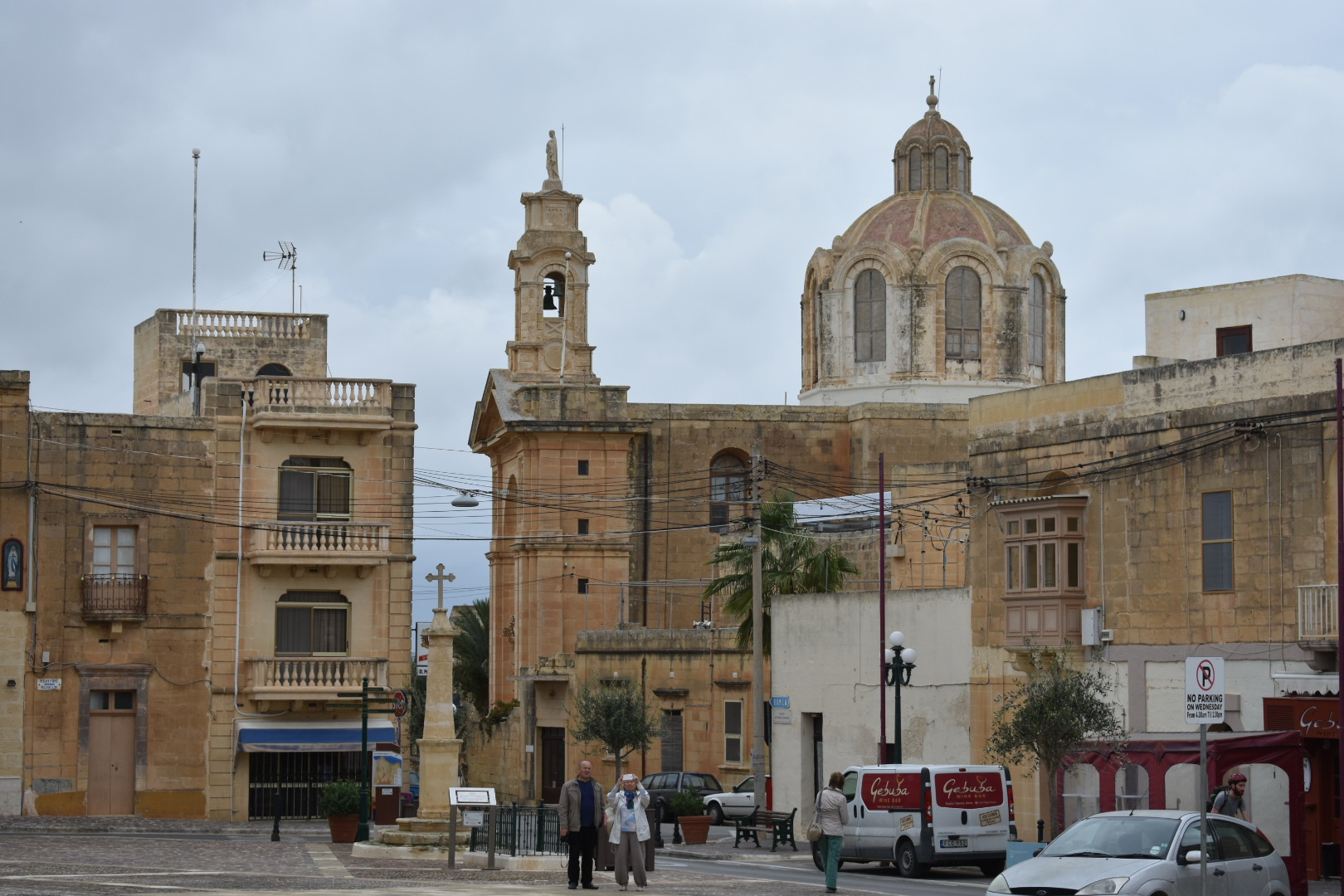
- View from the Nadur Square showing the Church of the Sacred Heart of Jesus (a smaller church close to the Nadur Parish Church)

- Flag Coat of arms

- Coordinates: 36°2′17″N 14°17′42″E
- Country: Malta
- Region: Gozo Region
- District: Gozo and Comino District
- Established: 1932
- Borders: Għajnsielem, Qala, Xagħra

Government
  - Mayor: Edward Said (PN)

Area
  - Total: 7.2 km^{2} (2.8 sq mi)

Population (July 2024)
  - Total: 4,625
  - Density: 640/km^{2} (1,700/sq mi)
- Demonym(s): Naduri (m), Nadurija (f), Nadurin (pl)
- Time zone: UTC+1 (CET)
  - Summer (DST): UTC+2 (CEST)
- Postal code: NDR
- Dialing code: 356
- ISO 3166 code: MT-37
- Patron saint: St. Peter and St. Paul
- Day of festa: 29 June
- Website: Official website

Nadur (Maltese: In-Nadur) is an administrative unit of Malta, located in the eastern part of the island of Gozo. Nadur is built on a plateau and is one of the largest localities in Gozo. Known as the 'second city', it spreads along a high ridge to the east of Victoria. The population of Nadur was 4,625 in July 2024. This included 2,396 males and 2,229 females; 3,944 Maltese nationals and 681 foreign nationals.

The word is derived from the Arabic word ‘nadara’, which means 'lookout', pretty much having the same meaning as its motto ‘Vigilant’. The motto appears in Nadur’s coat of arms that shows the sun coming up from blue seas. The town is famous for its bakeries.

Near Nadur are San Blas and Dahlet Qorrot Bays, tiny rocky bays on the North Eastern coast. These are locations for swimming, snorkeling, picnics, and trekking.

== History ==
There are no documents or archaeological evidence which could shed light on the colonisation of Nadur by its first inhabitants. Nevertheless, the plateau and its surroundings, with a few farmhouses scattered here and there, were in existence for many years well before the area became a parish. The only trace of archaeological evidence were a number of large flat stones found in a field between San Blas Bay and Daħlet Qorrot. According to the Gozitan historian Giovanni Pietro Francesco Agius de Soldanis these roofed structures, which do not exist anymore, once used to serve as a sort of temple to gods. He also imagined that these slabs of stone couldn't have been placed there by normal people but by very strong people or giants. He also wrote that Nadur may have been founded during the time of the Greeks. One proof of this connection is a bronze statue of Apollo said to be found in Nadur in 1746.

Throughout history, Nadur played a very important role in the defence of the island from corsairs, hence the name. During the reign of the Knights of St. John, a watch tower was built by Grandmaster Nicolás Cotoner which has been referred to by Daħlet Qorrot Tower or San Blas Tower for the two bays lying on either side of it. The tower is locally known as Isopu Tower.

Another watchtower found in Nadur is Ta' Kenuna Tower built by the British towards the middle of the 19th century. It served as a telegraph link between Malta and Gozo. From the top of this semaphore tower, one can see most of the island, Comino and Mellieħa with a wonderful view in the winter of the green fields and the blue sea. The area near the tower was constructed into a garden.

== Demographics ==
As of March 2014, Nadur had a population which neared 4,500 people, which makes it the third most populated Gozitan town after Xagħra and Victoria.

A small number of people earn their living from the sea as fishermen or sailors. Almost all other people work as businessmen, analysts, teachers, and other professions.

There are about 20 farmers in Nadur, the majority of whom work their fields on part-time basis. From the orchards of Nadur come most of the local fruits such as plums, peaches, apples, oranges and lemons. This produce maintained commercial contacts with Malta for over 3000 years. Today this commerce is still ongoing and a great amount of Maltese citrus fruits are produced in Nadur. The local council has promoted the planting of olive trees imported from Italy as these trees have consistently decreased in number over time.

== Regions ==
Although Nadur is spread out, it can be split in various regions, namely the main square, Ta' Ħida, San Blas and Ta' Kenuna.

The main square centres around the parish church, with a host of shops, eateries, snack bars, and mostly residential housing. Important places of interest in the centre are: Sacred Heart (Ta' Karkanja) church, Local Council, police station, parish office, primary school, Mnarja Band Club, Nadur Youngsters Football Club, Museum branches (male and female), Franciscan Sisters Convent & Chapel and playing field.

Ta' Ħida's main artery surrounds Ramla Bay's main road, which is particularly busy in the summertime. Ta' Ħida's new extension, along Ramla Bay road, comprises a housing estate built in the 1970s and a playing field. A new, albeit controversial, cemetery is being constructed on the way to Ramla.

San Blas has both residential areas, relatively old and new, fertile land and valleys, full of mainly citrus trees. San Blas takes the name after the little secluded red-sandy bay, called after bishop Blaise, whose veneration still exists in the Catholic Church up to today. A nearby beach is Daħlet Qorrot (an 'inland beach'), with many locals owning caves and garages where many keep their fishing boats. Nearby is San Blas, a tiny, sandy bay on the north-eastern coast. It is a favourite spot for swimming for local residents. Close to San Blas, one finds also a bushy arid area called il-Qortin as well as the Mistra Rocks coastline. Gozo's AFM base is located here, together with Ta' Sopu Tower, which can be found in a restored state.

The Ta' Kenuna area was developed in the early 1980s. Previously, the area was barren, except for the Ta' Kenuna Tower, a telegraph structure built under the British era, Nadur cemetery and some vineyards. Although in the past the cemetery seemed to scare off people, and no one dared to live next to it. Today the cemetery has become a traffic island, surrounded by busy roads and residential areas.

== Nadur Parish ==
The religious feast of Nadur – Mnarja – is celebrated on 29 June. The feast was popular with honeymooners and its name seems to suggest that there is a possible connection with the beginning of summer. It is derived from luminaria (illumination), and in fact, it is a festival rooted in Maltese seasonal rituals and customs.

The titular statue, that of St. Peter and St. Paul, was made in Marseille in 1882. It is located in the church. On Good Friday, a set of statues are taken out for the holy procession depicting the passion and Crucifixion of Jesus. In the morning of Easter, a statue of the Risen Lord is paraded.

The parish church, dedicated to St. Peter and St. Paul, is a monument of both architecture and painting, rich in marble works and decorations, erected on the site of a former smaller church and which is also the highest point in town.

== St. Peter & St. Paul Basilica ==
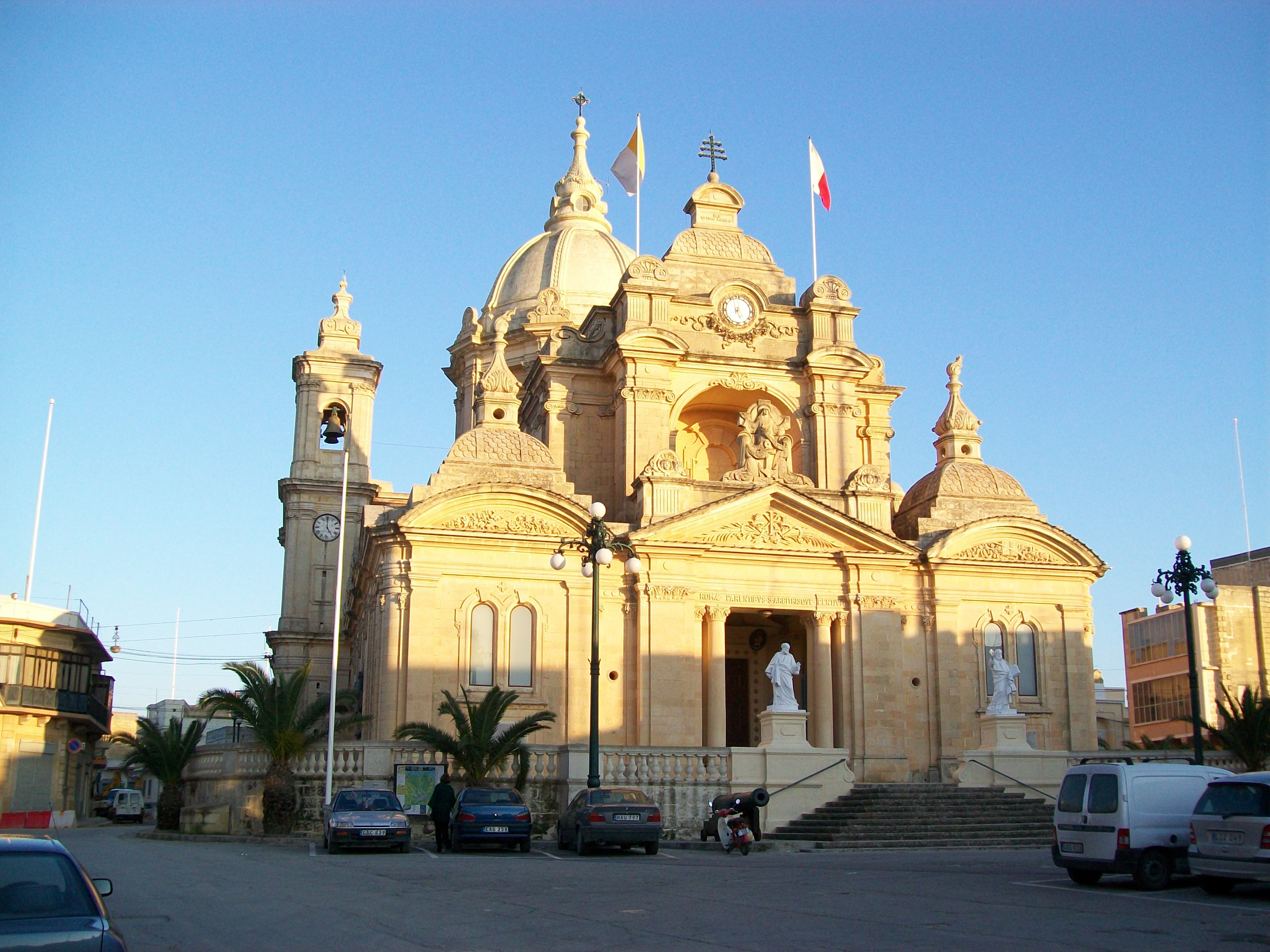
Nadur Basilica

The construction of the present church was started on 28 September 1760 and the design is attributed to the Maltese architect Giuseppe Bonici.

In 1907, a refurbishment programme took place to construct the aisles, dome and façade based on the Italian Renaissance design of Prof. F.S. Sciortino. The ceiling, depicting episodes connected with St. Peter and St. Paul, was painted by Lazzaro Pisani (hailing from Żebbuġ), while the architectural decorations are the work of the Italian Pio Cellini. The principal force behind all these new projects was Archpriest Martin Camilleri (1910–1921).

The parish has its own community radio station: Radju Luminarja, established more than 25 years ago accumulating several members since then, particularly in the 2000s.

== Band clubs ==
- Mnarja Band Club (L-Għaqda Mużikali Mnarja)

== Administration ==
The Nadur Local Council, following the 2024 local elections, is composed of five councillors.

- Edward Said (Mayor) - PN
- Kevin Curmi (Vice-Mayor) - PN
- Eucharist Camilleri - PN
- Rebecca Vella - PL
- Jean-Paul Joseph Saviour Portelli - PL

== Zones in Nadur ==
- Ta' Ħida
- Ta' Kenuna
- Ta' Ġebel
- Ta' Żejtun
- Ta' Sardina
- Ta' Spilotti
- Ta' Venuta
- Ta' Wistin
- Tad-Duru
- Tal-Ħali
- Tal-Laċċa
- Tal-Weraq
- Tat-Tiġrija
- Tax-Xewka
- Tax-Xini
- (Wied) San Blas
- Ta' Xurdin
