= Basilica of St Peter and St Paul, Nadur =

Basilica and Collegiate Matrix Parish church of St Peter and St Paul
- Il-Bażilika u Kolleġġjata Arċipretali ta' San Pietru u San Pawl
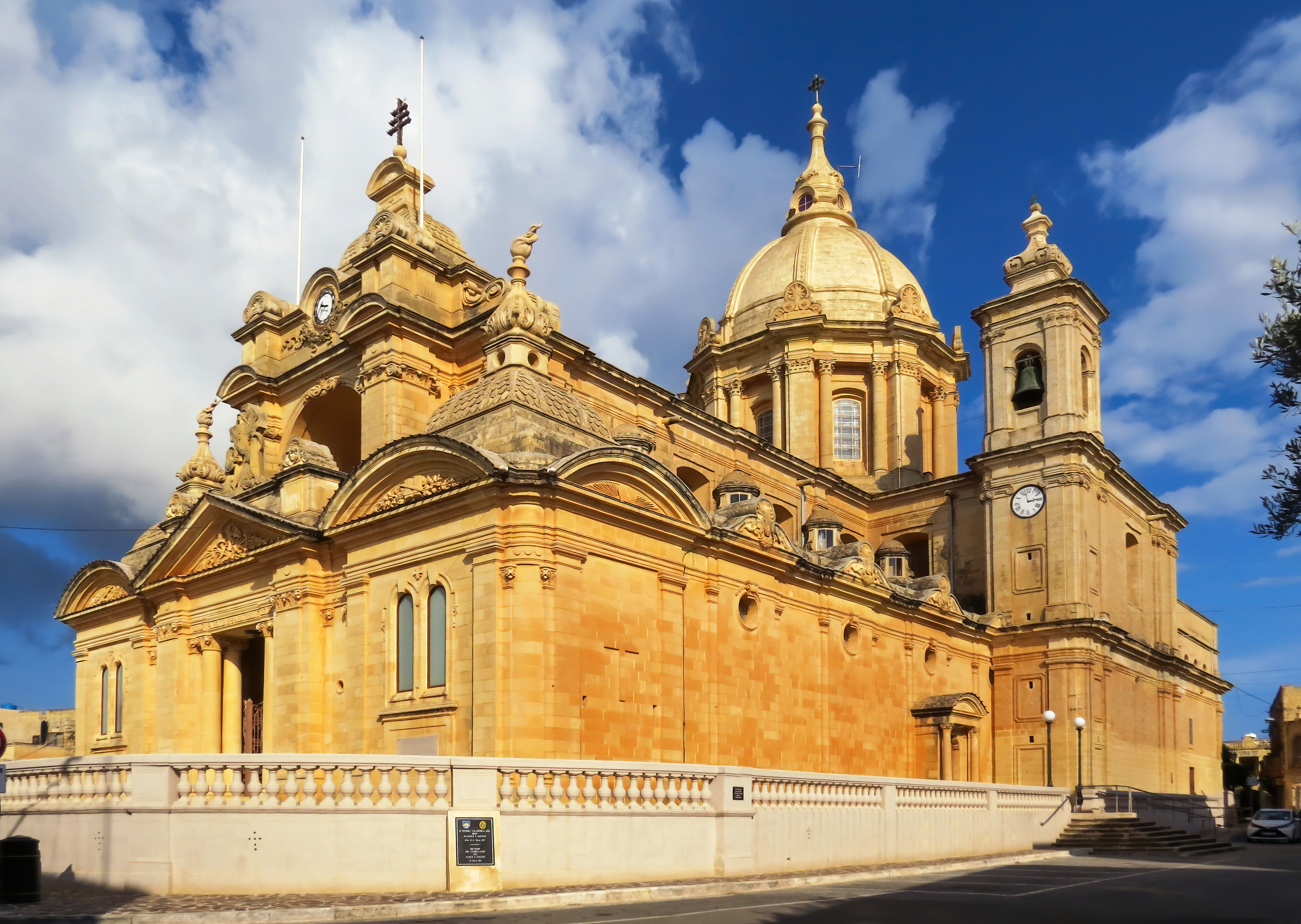
- The church in 2019
- Basilica and Collegiate Matrix Parish church of St Peter and St Paul
- 36°02′15.6″N 14°17′39.1″E
- Location: Nadur, Gozo, Malta
- Denomination: Roman Catholic
- Website: www.nadurparish.com

History
- Status: Parish church
- Founded: 28 September 1760
- Dedication: Saint Peter and Saint Paul
- Consecrated: 12 May 1867

Architecture
- Functional status: Active
- Architect(s): Giuseppe Grech and Giuseppe Bonnici
- Years built: 1760–1804
- Groundbreaking: 1760
- Completed: 1804

Specifications
- Materials: Limestone

Administration
- Diocese: Gozo
- Parish: Nadur

Clergy
- Dean: Rev. Mgr Can Saviour Muscat

The Basilica of St Peter and St Paul is a Roman Catholic minor basilica and parish church located in Nadur, Gozo in Malta.

== History ==
The parish of Nadur was established by the Bishop of Malta Davide Cocco Palmieri on 28 April 1688. The Immaculate Conception church in Qala served the spiritual needs of the parish until the parish church was constructed. The construction of the present church was started on 28 September 1760 and the design is attributed to the Maltese architect Giuseppe Bonici. Construction on the church finished on 12 May 1867. The third Collegiate chapter of Gozo was established on 19 September 1894.

This church is one of the most beautiful churches on the island. In 1907, a refurbishment programme took place to construct the aisles, dome and façade based on the Italian Renaissance design of Prof. F.S. Sciortino. The ceiling, depicting episodes connected with St Peter and Paul, was painted by the Maltese artist Lazzaro Pisani, while the architectural decorations are the work of the Italian Pio Cellini. Principal force behind all these new projects was Archpriest Martin Camilleri. The church became a minor Basilica on 26 June 1967.

Parish Priests

Name	Tenure
Rev. Bernardo Haber	1689–1705
Rev. Ignatio Hagius	1706–1708
Rev. Giovanni Andrea Falson	1708–1743
Rev. Salvatore Galea	1743–1778
Rev. Francesco Sapiano	1778–1812
Rev. Antonino Scasciato	1812–1827
Rev. Nicola Spiteri	1828–1853
Rev. Giovanni Battista Grech	1855–1876
Rev. Giovanni Camilleri	1881–1894

Archpriests:

Name	Tenure
Rev. Can Giovanni Camilleri	1894–1910
Rev. Can Dr Martino Camilleri	1910–1921
Rev. Can Antonio Camilleri	1922–1926
Rev. Can Giuseppe Cassar	1927–1950
Rev. Can Michele Portelli	1951–1982
Rev. Mgr Can Salvatore Muscat	1983–2010
Rev. Can Jimmy Xerri	2010–2024
Rev. Can Dr Krystof Buttigieg	2024 -
