= San Blas Bay (Malta) =

Beach in Gozo, Malta

- Il-Bajja ta' San Blas
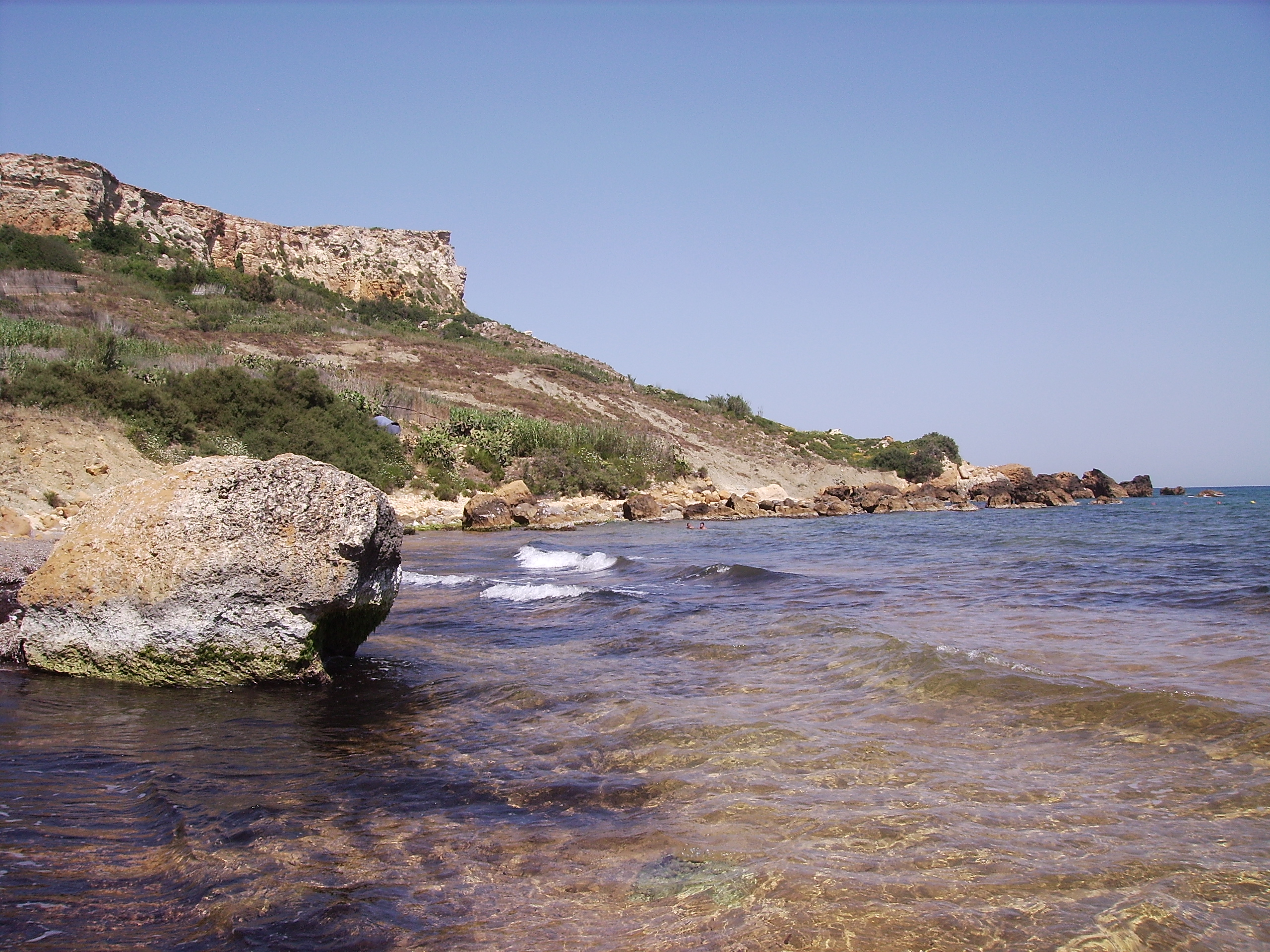
- A view of the bay

- Location of San Blas Bay in Malta
- Location: Gozo, Malta
- Coordinates: 36°3′25″N 14°18′2″E
- Type: Sea
- Part of: Mediterranean Sea
- Max. length: 140 metres (460 ft)
- Max. width: 43 metres (141 ft)
- Surface area: 0.48 hectares (1.2 acres)
- Average depth: 11.48 feet (3.50 m)
- Max. depth: 16.4 feet (5.0 m)
- Shore length^{1}: 193 metres (633 ft)
- Surface elevation: 0 metres (0 ft)
- ^{1} Shore length is not a well-defined measure.

San Blas Bay (Maltese: Il-Bajja ta' San Blas) is a small beach located in Gozo, Malta. The beach mostly consists of a fine, reddish sand. It is located 1.54 kilometres (0.96 mi) east of the larger Ramla Bay as well as 2 kilometres (1.2 mi) north of Nadur. The bay is known for its desolateness and subsequent lack of intrusion. The road leading to it is also famously known to be very badly maintained.
