= Għasri =

Għasri L-Għasri
- Local council
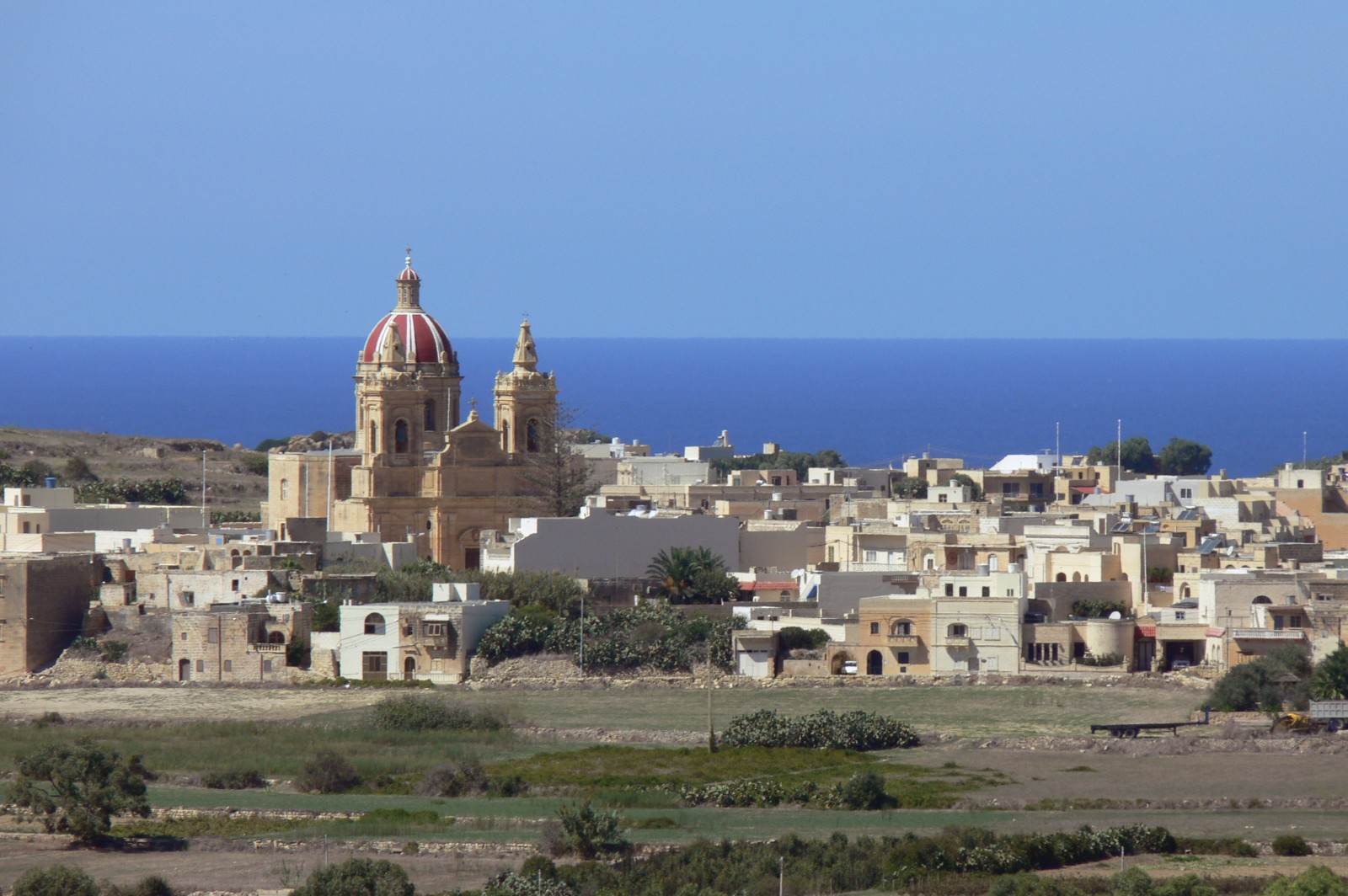
- Għasri as seen from the Cittadella

- Flag Coat of arms
- Motto: Ex labore fructus
- Coordinates: 36°3′30″N 14°13′40″E
- Country: Malta
- Region: Gozo Region
- District: Gozo and Comino District
- Borders: Għarb, Kerċem, Victoria, Żebbuġ

Government
  - Mayor: Daniel Attard (Independent)

Area
  - Total: 5 km^{2} (1.9 sq mi)

Population (Jul. 2024)
  - Total: 529
  - Density: 110/km^{2} (270/sq mi)
- Demonym(s): Għasri (m), Għasrija (f), Għasrin (pl)
- Time zone: UTC+1 (CET)
  - Summer (DST): UTC+2 (CEST)
- Postal code: GSR
- Dialing code: 356
- ISO 3166 code: MT-16
- Patron saint: Corpus Christi
- Day of festa: June
- Website: Official website

Għasri (Maltese: L-Għasri) is a village and an administrative unit of Malta, in the western part of the island of Gozo. The population of Għasri was 529 in July 2024. This included 284 males and 245 females; 421 Maltese nationals and 108 foreign nationals. By population, it is the smallest village in Gozo after San Lawrenz, and the third-smallest in the Maltese Islands, after Bidnija and Mdina. Għasri, however, has a relatively large area.

The village lies between the hills of Żebbuġ and Għammar. The name has Arabic origins and refers to the period of the day between the afternoon and the evening.

== Location ==
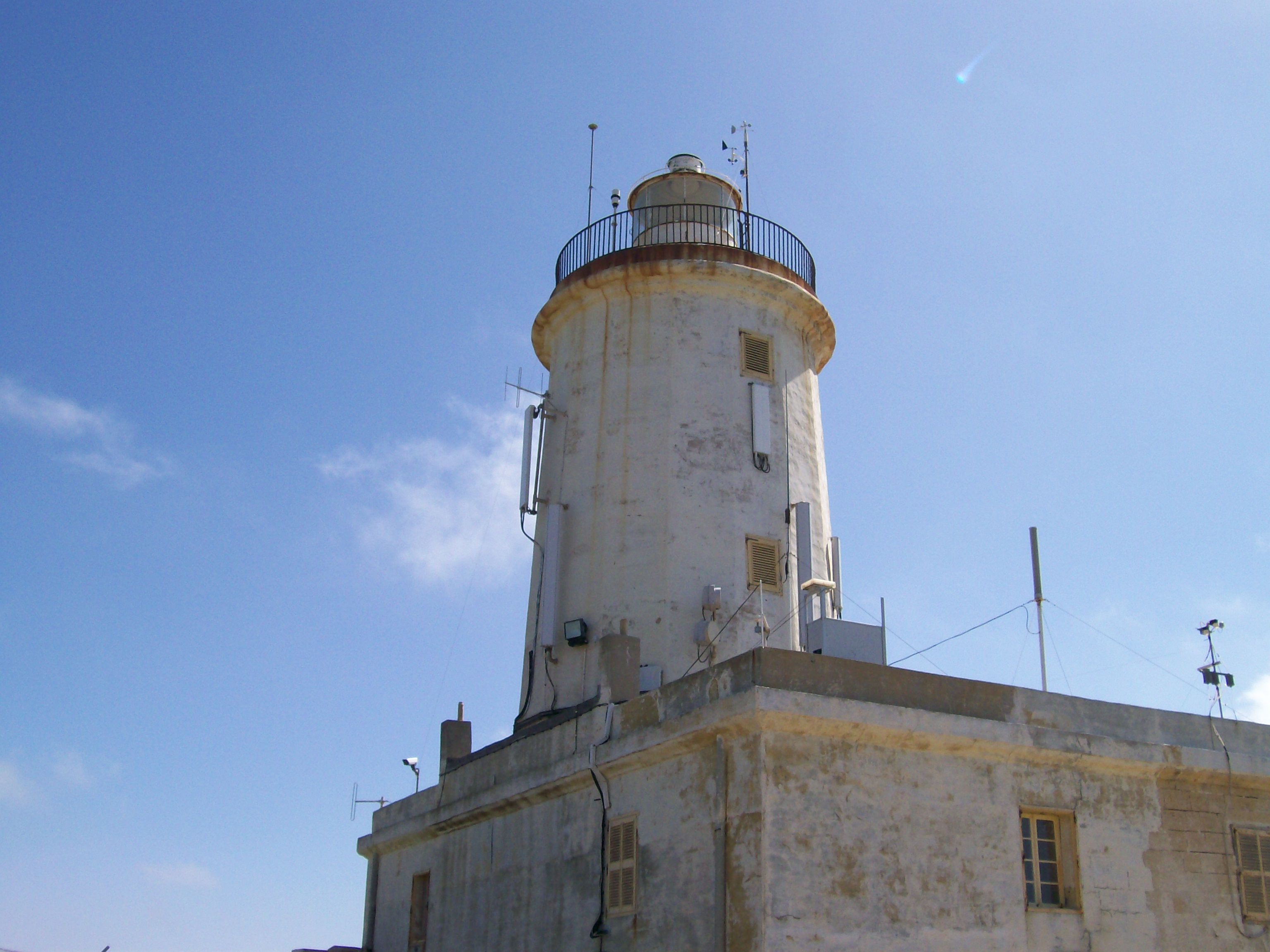
A view of the Gurdan Lighthouse.

Giordan Lighthouse on Ġurdan Hill dominates Għasri. Inaugurated in 1853, this famous lighthouse rises 180 metres above sea level. Its beam can be seen up to 50 kilometres away. Upon the hill around the lighthouse there are 360-degree views of Gozo that lure many hikers to ascend the steep path to the hilltop.

Ta Għammar Hill acts as an observation point and has a set of 14 sculptured stations of the cross, established by pilgrims visiting the area after World War II.

From the Village Square, a road leads to the valley of Wied il-Għasri. On the way, there are a number of typical farmhouses, most of them available for short or long lets, as well as an old chapel dedicated to the Patronage of the Blessed Virgin Mary. The Wied il-Għasri area is a marvelous country walk or cycling site especially in winter and spring. The valley ends in the sea, between high cliffs with a secluded inlet where visitors can swim, snorkel and dive: the sea around Wied il-Għasri is popular among divers. In Għasri valley one can find salt pans.

The village church, designed by a local priest, Dun Ġużepp Diacono, was built early in the twentieth century. Its foundation stone was laid on 6 September 1903, and it was dedicated to the Corpus Christi, otherwise known as Christ the Saviour in the Eucharist on 9 January 1916. The village was established as a parish by Bishop Giovanni Maria Camilleri on 16 December 1921.

== Access and roads ==
Għasri is reached by forking right on the Victoria-Għarb road just after the aqueduct.

=== Main roads in Għasri ===
- Pjazza Salvatur (Corpus Christi Square)
- Triq il-Fanal (Lighthouse Street)
- Triq il-Wilġa (Daleland Street)
- Triq iż-Żebbuġ (Zebbug Road)
- Triq Salvu Gambin (S. Gambin Street)
- Triq Dun Karm Caruana (Fr. Carmelo Caruana Street)

=== Other streets ===
- Daħla Ta' Għammar (Għammar Street)
- Sqaq il-Knisja (Church Alley)
- Sqaq Wied tal-Qattus (Cat's Valley Alley)
- Trejqet Ġesù Nazzarenu (Jesus of Nazareth Path)
- Trejqet il-Farfett tal-Korpus (Corpus Butterfly Path)
- Triq id-Dehra (Apparition Street)
- Triq il-Ġonna (Gardens Street)
- Triq il-Knisja (Church Street)
- Triq il-Maxrabija (Maxrabija Street)
- Triq it-Tamar (Dates Street)
- Triq l-Għarb (Għarb Road)
- Triq Ta' Għammar (Għammar Road)
- Triq Ta' Pinu (Ta' Pinu Road)
- Triq Tal-Fenek (Tal-Fenek Road)
- Triq Tal-Kanun (Tal-Kanun Road)
- Triq Wied l-Għasri (Għasri Valley Road)
- Triq Wied Sara (Sahra Valley Road)
- Wesgħa Dun Ġużepp Buttigieg (Fr. Joseph Buttigieg Place)

== Twin towns – sister cities ==
Għasri is twinned with:

- Ottenschlag, Austria
- Le Cabanial, France
