= Corpus Christi Church, Għasri =

Corpus Christi Church
- Corpus Christi Parish Church
- Il-Knisja Parrokkjali ta' Kristu Ewkaristiku Salvatur
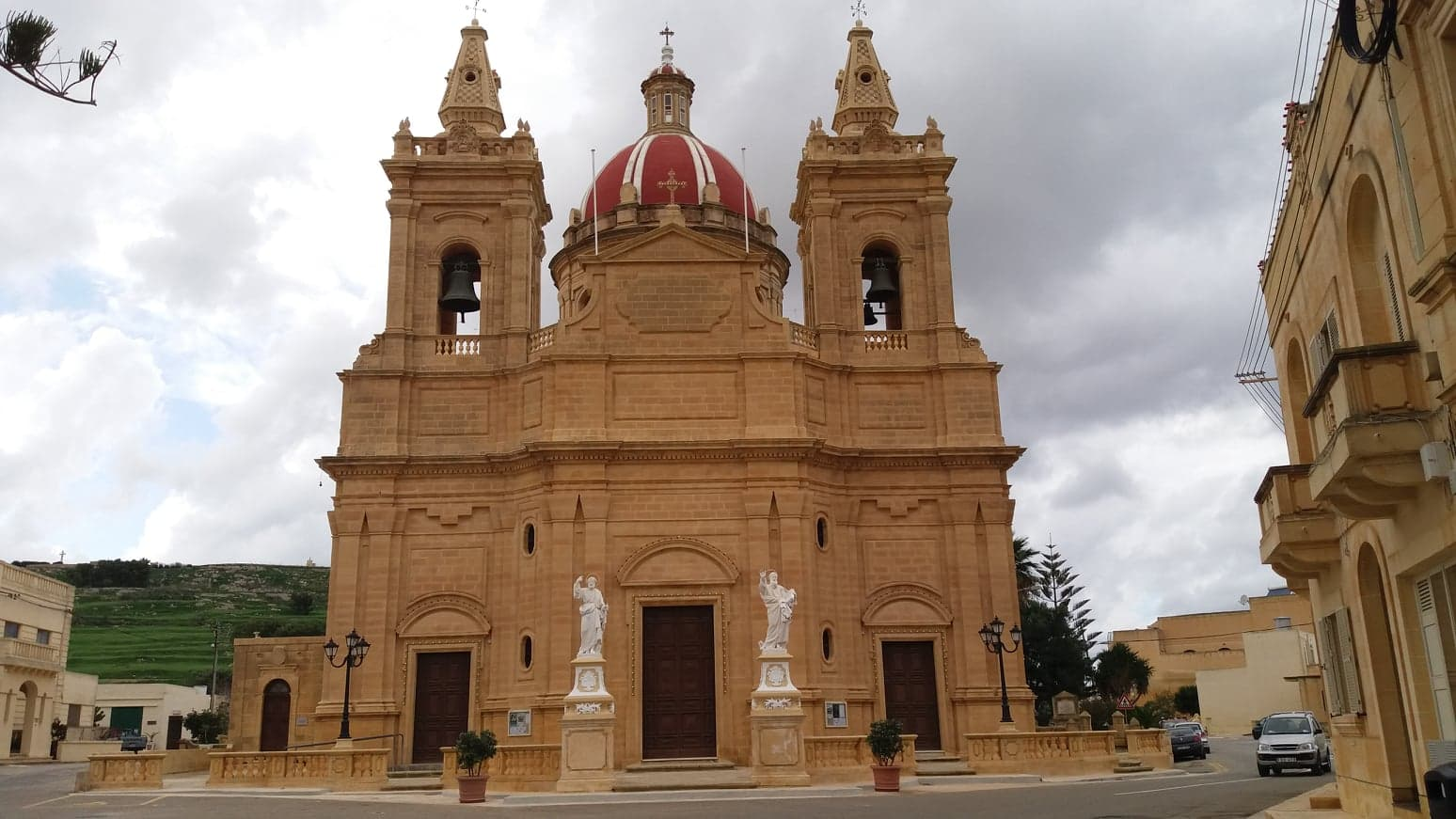
- The façade of the parish church.
- Corpus Christi Church
- 36°03′31.8″N 14°13′34.8″E
- Location: Għasri, Gozo, Malta
- Denomination: Roman Catholic
- Website: Għasri Parish on Facebook

History
- Status: Active
- Founded: 16 December 1921 (as a parish)
- Dedication: Corpus Christi and Christ the Saviour
- Dedicated: 1916
- Consecrated: 1916

Architecture
- Functional status: Parish church
- Architect: Rev. Mgr. Archpriest Ġużepp Diacono
- Architectural type: Church
- Style: Baroque
- Years built: 1903–1916
- Groundbreaking: 6 September 1903
- Completed: 9 January 1916 (consecration)

Specifications
- Materials: Limestone

Administration
- Province: Malta
- Diocese: Diocese of Gozo
- Parish: Corpus Christi Parish
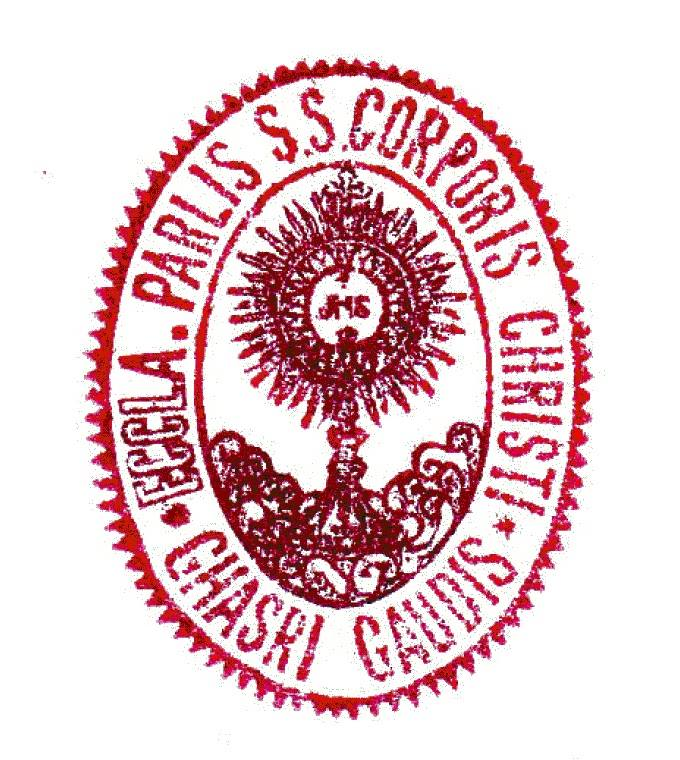

The Corpus Christi Church is a Roman Catholic parish church in Għasri, in Gozo, Malta. It forms part of the Roman Catholic Diocese of Gozo.

== Elevation to Parish Church ==
By a decree issued on 19 May 1921, Pope Benedict XV authorised the formation of the Corpus Christi Parish - one of the newest parishes in the diocese - with the Corpus Christi Church as the parish church.

== Artwork ==
=== The Chancel ===
The Main Altarpiece

The titular altarpiece is The Last Supper by Lazzaro Pisani and is located in the choir. It was commissioned by the then-curator and vice-parish priest the Rev. Fr. Carmelo Caruana. The painting was installed in 1917. By 2007, due to the weight of the canvas itself, creases were forming in the painting and it was getting unstuck from its frame. BOV sponsored the restoration. The restoration was carried out by Emanuel Zammit, from Żejtun following his other works in the Cathedral of the Assumption in Gozo.

The decorator Antonio Agius is responsible for the frame, which was done a year later. This, and his other works in the parish church are considered to be his climax.

== Parish Priests ==
Pastors of the Parish Church
	Name	Date of Birth	Date of Death	Term Started	Termination of Position
1	Dun Ġużepp Galea	16 Jan 1892	24 Dec 1936	5 Mar 1922	1924 (resigned)
2	Dun M'Anġ Grima	26 Jul 1888	21 Nov 1968	31 Oct 1924	1929 (transferred)
3	Rev. Salv Scicluna	22 Jul 1888	12 Mar 1944	19 Mar 1929	1937 (transferred)
4	Rev. Franġisk Mercieca	24 Feb 1891	27 Nov 1964	23 May 1937	1938 (transferred)
5	Rev. Manwel Xerri	30 Jan 1895	12 Dec 1964	26 May 1938	1948 (transferred)
6	Rev. Ġużepp Borg	4 Nov 1912	Unknown	7 Nov 1948	1951 (transferred)
7	Rev. Can. Dun Karm Vella	17 Jan 1915	11 Mar 1969	9 Sep 1951	1965 (transferred)
8	Rev. Ġwann Cini	21 Dec 1935	Unknown	25 Apr 1965	1969 (transferred)
9	Rev. Mgr Ġużeppi Mintoff	17 Mar 1937	21 Sep 2014	1 Jun 1969	31 Mar 1992 (resigned)
10	Rev. Ġużepp Cini	19 Feb 1949	-	6 Jun 1992	6 Sep 2003 (resigned)
11	Rev. Mgr Dr Edward Xuereb	12 Apr 1970	-	28 Mar 2004	13 Sep 2021 (transferred)
12	Rev. Dr Dominic Sultana	-	-	14 Sep 2013	14 Jun 2023 (mandate ended)
Parochial Administrator	Rev. Can. Edward Vella	-	-	-	-

== Restoration ==
In 2018, after obtaining funds from the EU, the facade (including the bell towers), and the left side of the church are being restored.

== Pictures ==
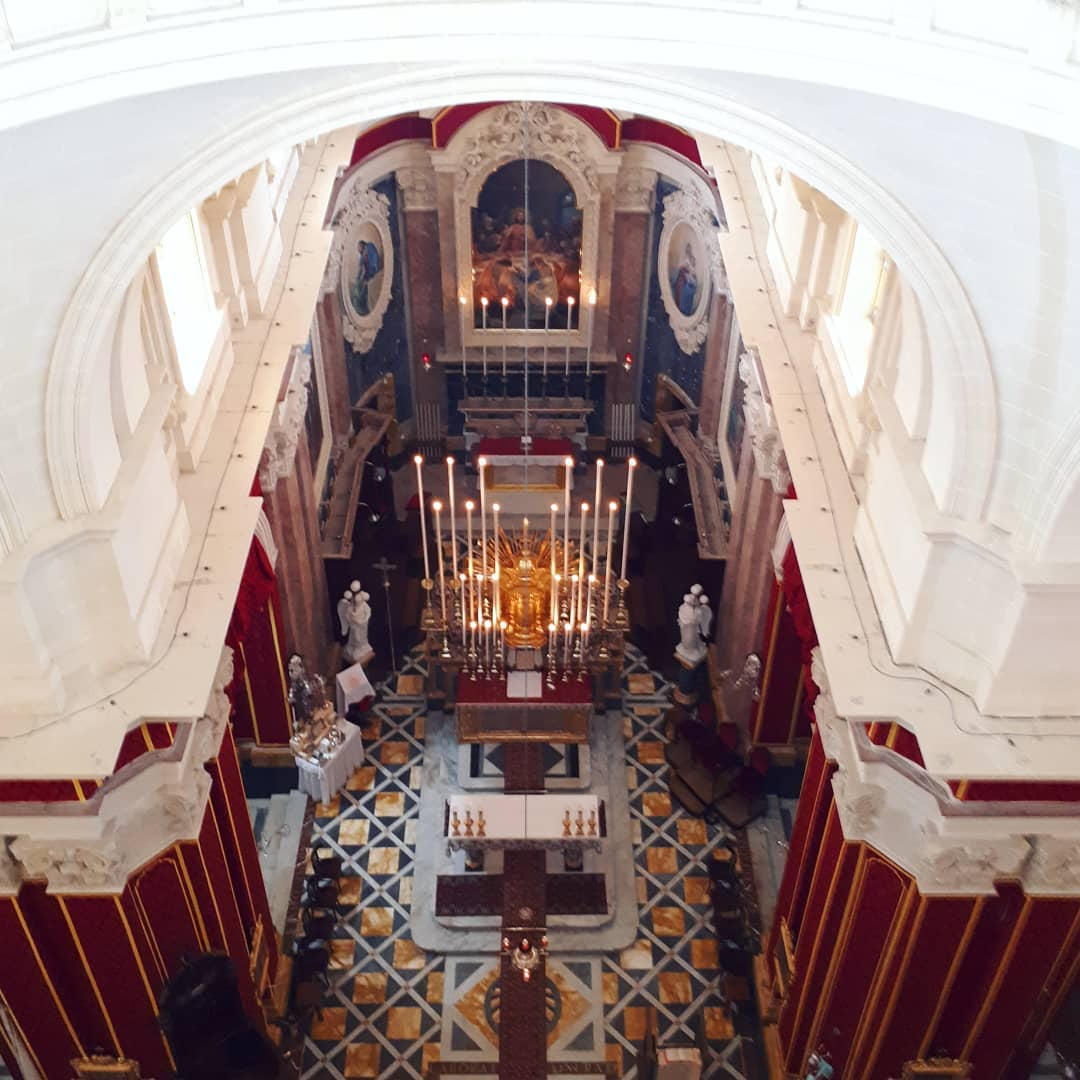
A view of the sanctuary and choir from the dome.
