= Ramla Bay =

Bay with a beach of reddish-coloured sand in Gozo, Malta

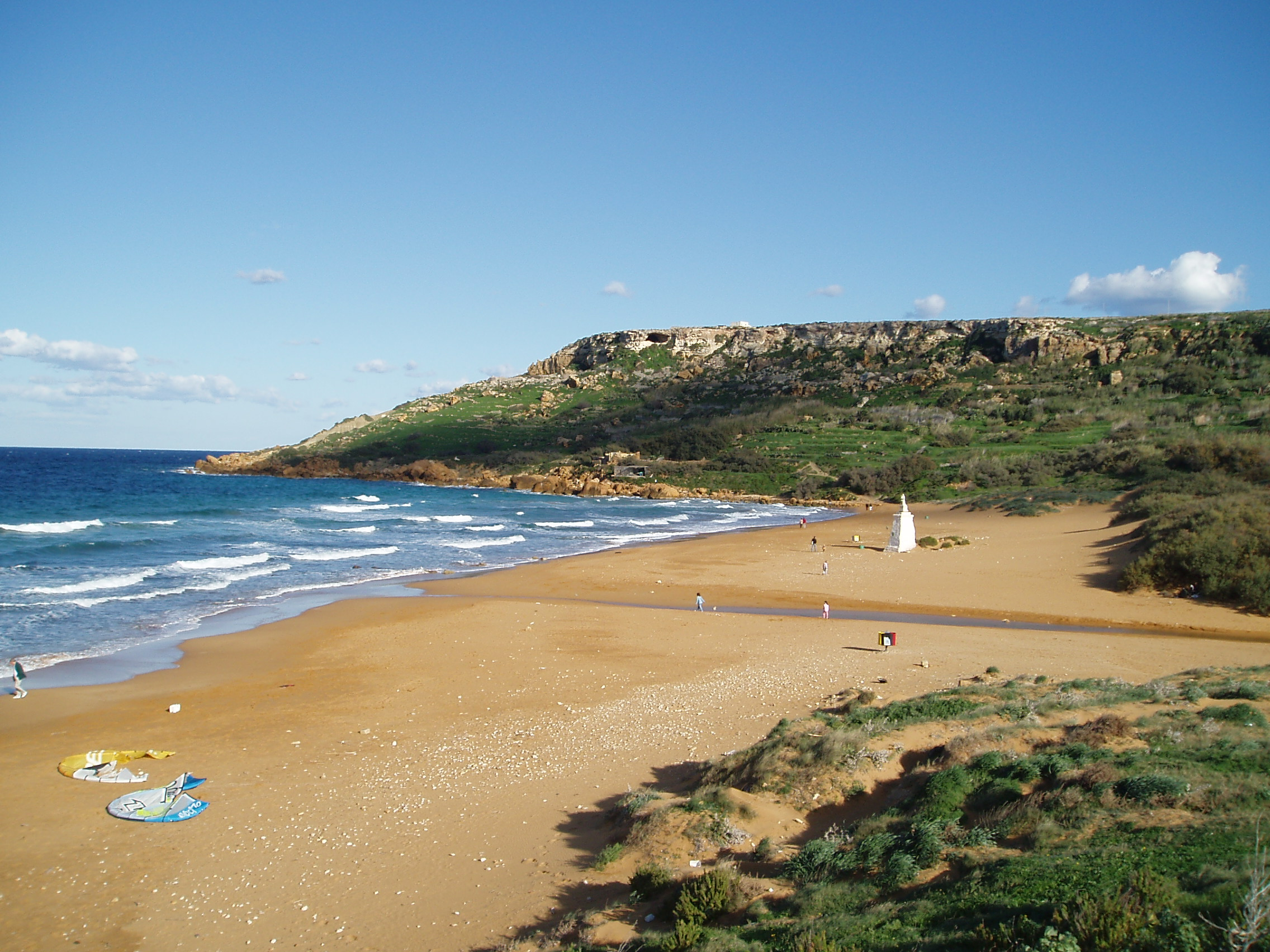
- Landscape of Ramla Bay

- Location of the bay in Malta
- Location: Malta
- Group: Mediterranean Sea
- Coordinates: 36°03′43.20″N 14°16′58.80″E
- Type: Bay
- Surface elevation: 0 metres (0 ft)

Ramla Bay (Maltese: Ir-Ramla l-Ħamra, "red sands") is a bay with a beach of reddish-coloured sand in Gozo, in the Maltese Islands. It lies on the north-east coast of the island, between the bays of Marsalforn and San Blas. The closest village is Xagħra.

== Planning permission ==
On June 6, 2007, the Malta Environment and Planning Authority (MEPA) approved the construction of 23 villas next to Calypso Cave, despite the objection of the Superintendent of Cultural Heritage, the Labour Party, the Alternattiva Demokratika and Malta's main environmental organisations. MEPA did not request an environment impact assessment for the development, leading to a call for their resignation. The case was expected to be reported to European Union environment commissioner Stavros Dimas. Claims that archeologists had found no objection to the development were rebutted by the same consultants, who were told that the report was to help assess the promotion of a heritage trail, rather than a mega-building project.
