= Paul Cardona =

Maltese priest (1953–2023)

The Very Reverend Monsignor Pawl Cardona
- Archpriest Emeritus of St George's
- Church: Roman Catholic Church
- Diocese: Gozo
- Appointed: 17 September 2007
- Installed: 4 November 2007
- Term ended: 4 November 2016
- Predecessor: Dr Joseph Farrugia
- Successor: Joseph Curmi
- Other posts: Rector of St Lucy's Church; Episcopal vicar for the Clergy

Orders
- Ordination: 18 June 1977 by Nikol Joseph Cauchi

Personal details
- Born: 22 January 1953 Sannat, Malta
- Died: 21 June 2023 (aged 70)

Pawl Cardona (22 January 1953 – 21 June 2023) was a Maltese Roman Catholic clergyman who served as the Episcopal vicar for the Clergy for the Diocese of Gozo. Prior to this he was the Archpriest of the Basilica of St George in Victoria, Gozo from 2007 to 2016.

== Early years ==
Paul Cardona was born on 22 January 1953 in Sannat, Gozo, Malta to Luigi Cardona and Rosina Sciberras. He attended the primary school of Sannat and the secondary school in Victoria, Gozo. He went on to enter the major Seminary of the Sacred Heart in Victoria, Gozo to study Philosophy in 1971 and Theology in 1973. He was ordained priest by Bishop Nikol Joseph Cauchi on 18 June 1977 in the Cathedral of the Assumption in Victoria.

== Time in Italy ==
In September 1977 Cardona left for Italy where he started his ministry in the Diocese of Tivoli. On 4 December 1977, he was appointed parish priest of the parish of St Philip Neri in Colle Fiorito di Guidonia. During his time in this parish, Cardona built a pastoral complex for the parish use. Cardona served in this parish until May 1989.

On 1 April 1989, Cardinal Ugo Poletti appointed Cardona as parish priest of the parish of San Liboria in Rome. Cardona built a church and parish center dedicated to St Liborius. It was consecrated on 7 November 1998 followed by a visit by Pope John Paul II on 17 January 1999. In 1997 Cardona was nominated as Prefect of the eleven prefectures of the Diocese of Rome by Cardinal Camillo Ruini. Moreover, in May 2000 he was appointed a member of the Commission of Sacred Art of the Diocese of Rome.

== Archpriest of St George's ==
On 17 September 2007, Cardona was appointed Archpriest of the parish of St George in Victoria, Gozo by Bishop Mario Grech. He succeeded Dr. Joseph Farrugia as Archpriest. Cardona was installed as Archpriest of the parish on 4 November 2007. He was appointed Episcopal vicar for the Clergy on 4 November 2016.

== Death ==
Cardona died on 21 June 2023, at the age of 70.
