= St Dimitri Chapel, Għarb =

Chapel of Saint Demetrius
- Kappella ta' San Dimitri
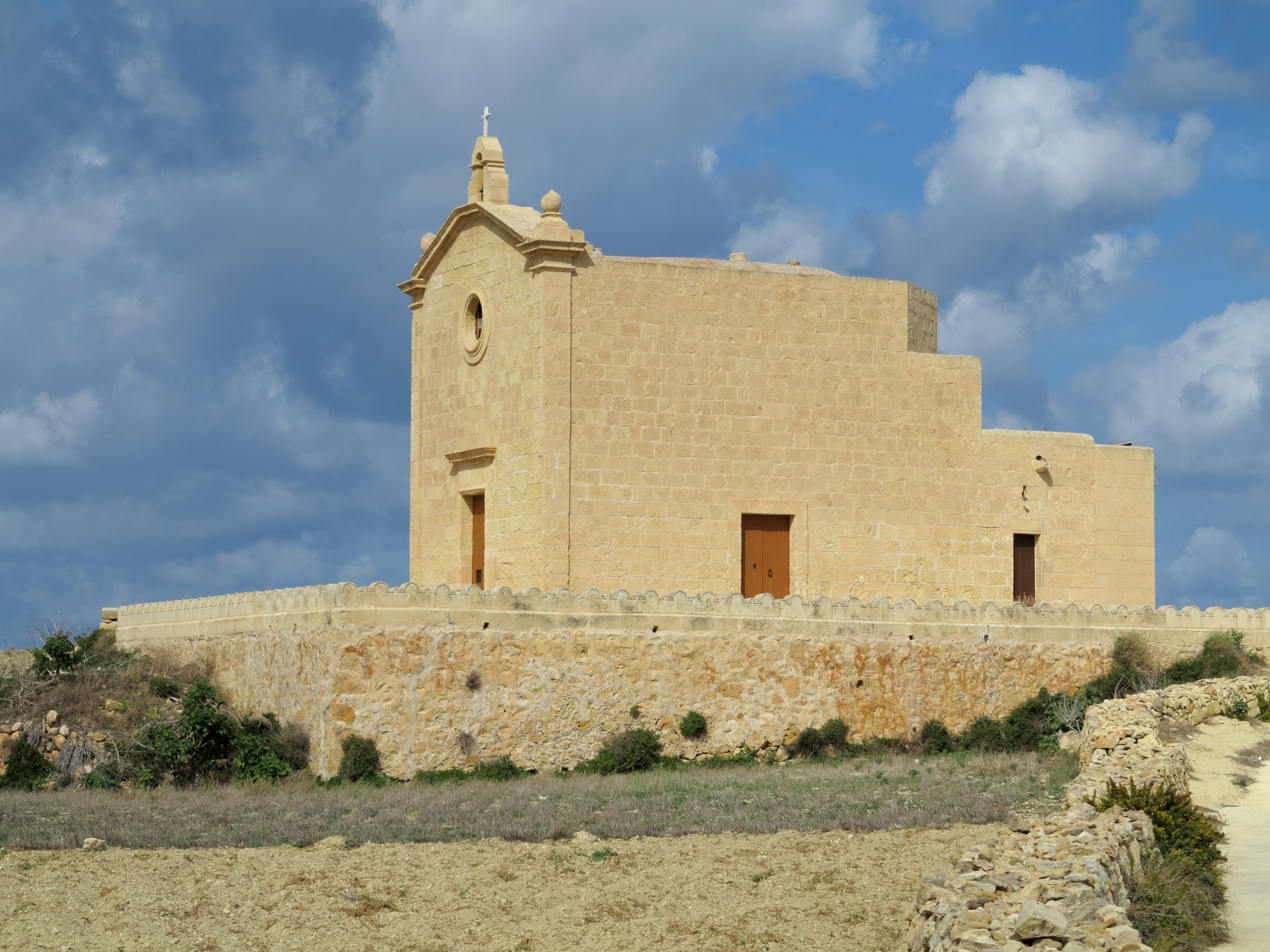
- The chapel as photographed in 2019
- Chapel of Saint Demetrius
- 36°04′15.8″N 14°12′16.8″E
- Location: Għarb, Gozo, Malta
- Denomination: Roman Catholic

History
- Status: Chapel
- Dedication: Demetrius of Thessaloniki
- Dedicated: 11 April 1809

Architecture
- Functional status: Active
- Years built: 15th century, 1694 (previous chapels) c. 1796–1809 (present chapel)

Specifications
- Materials: Limestone

Administration
- Diocese: Gozo
- Parish: Għarb

The Chapel of Saint Demetrius (Maltese: Kappella ta' San Dimitri) is a Roman Catholic chapel located in a rural area within the limits of Għarb, Gozo, Malta. It is the only chapel in the Maltese Islands dedicated to Demetrius of Thessaloniki, and it is associated with a legend in which the saint is said to have saved a young man who had been abducted by Barbary corsairs. The present chapel was constructed in the late 18th and early 19th centuries, although an earlier chapel dedicated to the saint had existed since around the 15th century.

== History ==
The first chapel dedicated to Saint Demetrius is believed to have been constructed by Dun Franġisk Depena sometime in the 15th century. It was visited by inquisitor Pietro Dusina in 1575, who noted in his report that the building was in a poor state. It appears to have been restored sometime after Dusina's visit, but when Bishop of Malta Miguel Juan Balaguer made a pastoral visit to the chapel on 24 May 1657, (Note: One source claims that the pastoral visit and deconsecration occurred in 1687; this is incorrect as at that point the Bishop of Malta was Davide Cocco Palmieri and Balaguer was dead.) it was once again in a dilapidated state and the bishop deconsecrated it. The chapel was reconstructed in 1694, but after some time it fell into disuse and collapsed.

The extant building was built around the turn of the 18th to 19th centuries at the initiative of Dun Mario Vella, who ordered the chapel's reconstruction and left an annual endowment of 5 scudi for repairs on 29 April 1796. (Note: Several sources claim that the rebuilding at Vella's initiative began in 1736 instead of 1796.) Construction began shortly afterwards but works stalled after some time, and the Għarb parish priest Dun Publio Refalo took over the project after Vella's death. Refalo asked Bishop Vincenzo Labini for permission to resume construction on 29 December 1801; this was issued on 29 March 1802, and after the chapel was completed it was blessed by Refalo on behalf of Bishop Ferdinando Mattei on 11 April 1809.

A parvis was built in front of the chapel in March 1930, and its interior was paved with tiles and a stone altar was installed in 1935. Near the start of World War II, a mass in the Byzantine Rite was celebrated in the chapel by Papas Schirò, the parish priest of the Greek community of Malta, at the initiative of procurator Dun Pawlu Formosa. The chapel underwent some minor changes after the war, including the addition of a zoccolo in 1950 and new altar following the Second Vatican Council.

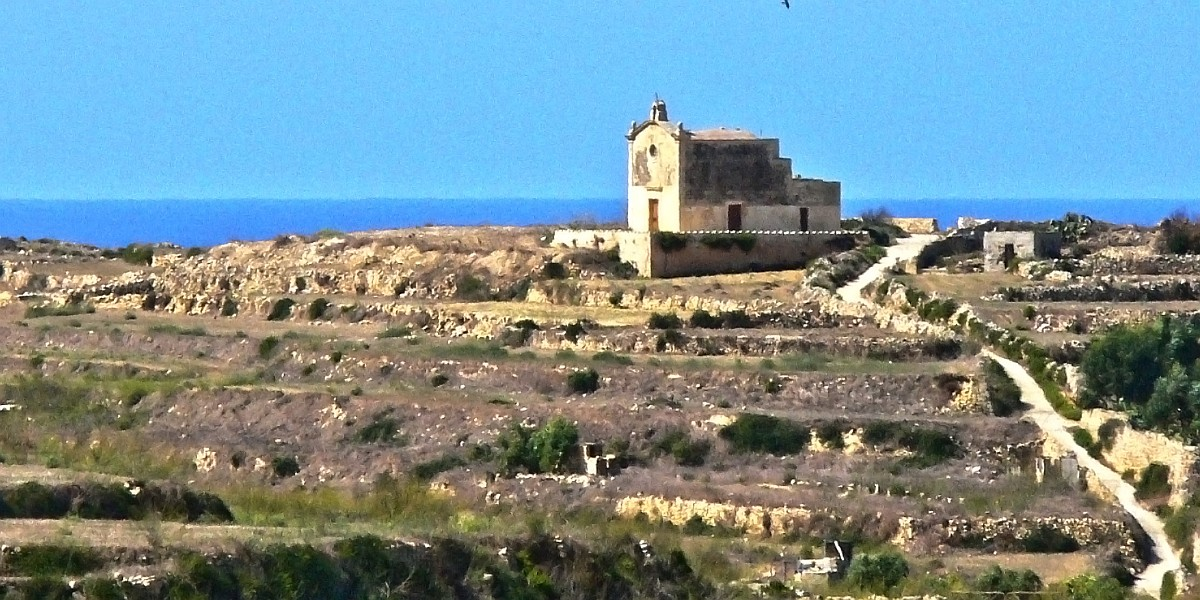
The chapel and its rural surroundings as photographed in 2009, prior to the building's restoration

In 2007, a Malta Environment and Planning Authority auditor noted that a fireworks factory which was located some 300 m (980 ft) away from the chapel posed a potential threat to the building. An accidental explosion at the factory on 5 September 2010 killed six people but did not cause any damage to the chapel other than broken glass. The chapel was restored in 2012 at the initiative of the Għarb local council using funds from the European Union and the Maltese government, and it was inaugurated by minister Chris Said on 3 February 2013. The building is listed on the National Inventory of the Cultural Property of the Maltese Islands.

Today, the chapel falls under the jurisdiction of the Għarb parish, with the village's archpriest acting as the chapel's rector. It is not regularly open for Mass, only being open on special occasions including weddings and retreats. A feast in honour of St Demetrius is celebrated annually on the second Sunday of October.

== Legend ==
A popular legend states that Natalizia Cauchi, an elderly woman known by the nickname Żgugina, lived close to the chapel with her only son – named Pawlu or Mattew in different versions of the story – when Barbary corsairs attacked their home and abducted her son. She went to the chapel where she prayed to Saint Demetrius and promised to light an oil lamp everyday in the chapel if he brought back her son. The chapel's altarpiece, a painting of the saint riding his horse, is said to have miraculously come to life and the saint rode out over land and sea until he reached the corsairs' ship. He then freed Żgugina's son and took him back to his mother, before reentering the painting in the chapel. Demetrius' horse is said to have left an imprint of its horseshoe on the rocks.

A second legend which complements the previous one states that some time later, the cliff on which the chapel was built gave way during an earthquake, toppling the chapel into the sea. Despite this, the building is said to have remained intact underwater, and fishermen and sailors are said to have seen Żguigina's oil lamp still burning in front of the painting of Saint Demetrius while on the bottom of the sea floor.

Worship of Saint Demetrius was popular in Gozo at a time when the island was vulnerable to attacks by corsairs, and Gozitans whose relatives had been captured during raids often prayed to the saint in order to free their loved ones from slavery and to return them home. The legend bears some similarities to a myth of Saint Nicholas saving a child named Basileos from slavery after an appeal from the child's mother. The legend of Saint Demetrius is mentioned in the writings of Giovanni Pietro Francesco Agius de Soldanis, and it has also been featured in poems by Mary Meilak and Ġużè Delia.

== Architecture and artworks ==
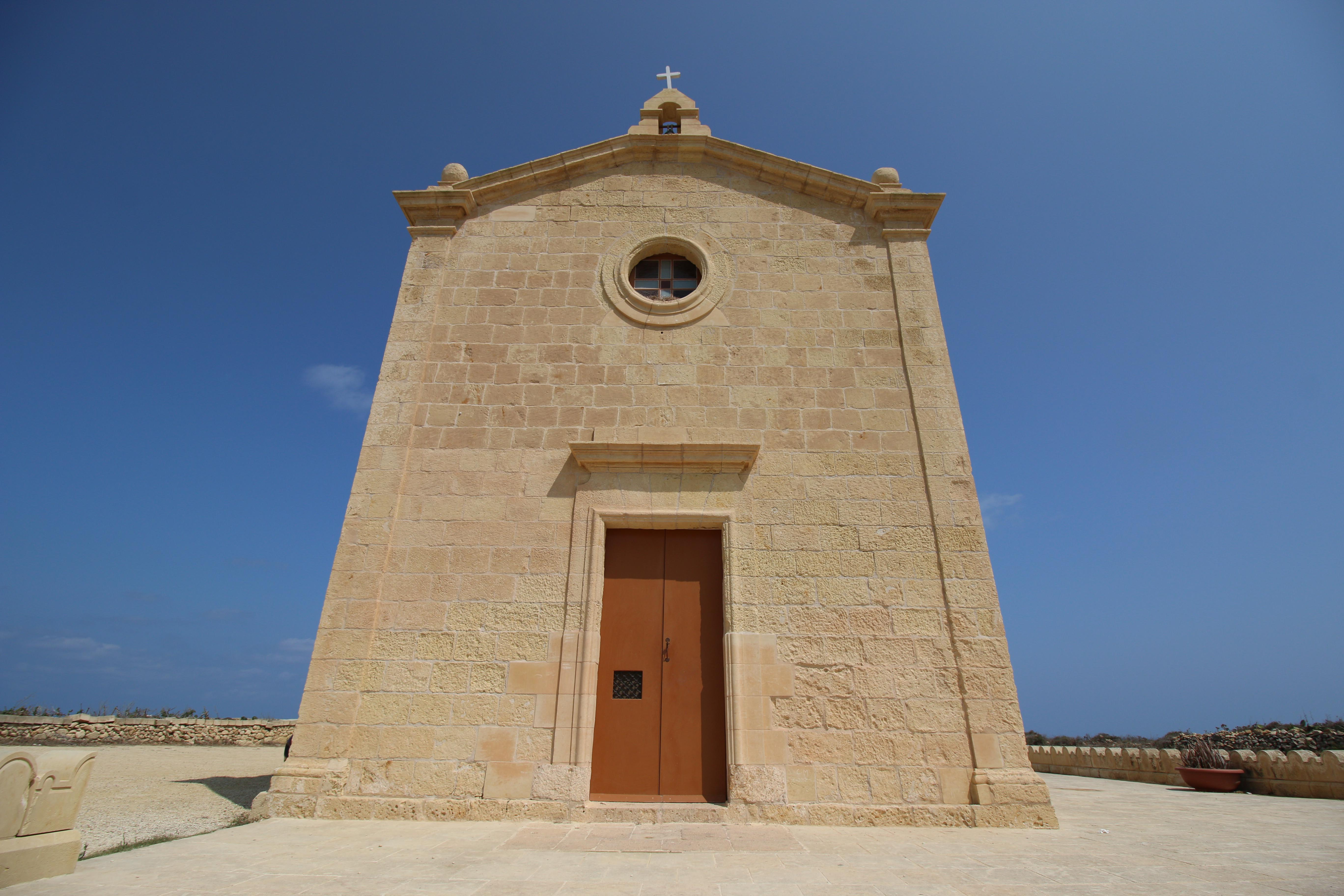
The chapel's façade as photographed in 2017

The chapel's architecture is simple, with a façade featuring a main portal, a circular window, pilasters topped by spheres on either side and a bell-cot topped by a cross. Internally, the chapel has a barrel vaulted ceiling, and a sacristy is located at the back of the building. It features a sculpted stone altar made by Wenzu Gatt in 1935, patterned floor tiles which were also installed in 1935, and a mosaic zoccolo which was installed in 1950.

The altarpiece depicts Saint Demetrius dressed as a soldier on a horse, with an old woman wearing an għonnella pleading with him on one side and a young man in chains on the other side, in reference to the legend. The painting's artist is unknown, but it bears the date 1810 and it was restored in 1937 by Wistin Camilleri. There are two other paintings on each side of the main altar, one representing Saint Aristarchus and the other the Assumption of Mary. Other paintings depict Saint Paul, the martyrdom of Saint Demetrius, and the Via Sagra. It is possible that some of the paintings were originally located in other chapels that were later deconsecrated.

The chapel also contains a relic which was brought from Rome on 14 February 1898.
