= St Lucy's Church, Gozo =

Santa Lucia's Church
- Knisja ta' Santa Luċija
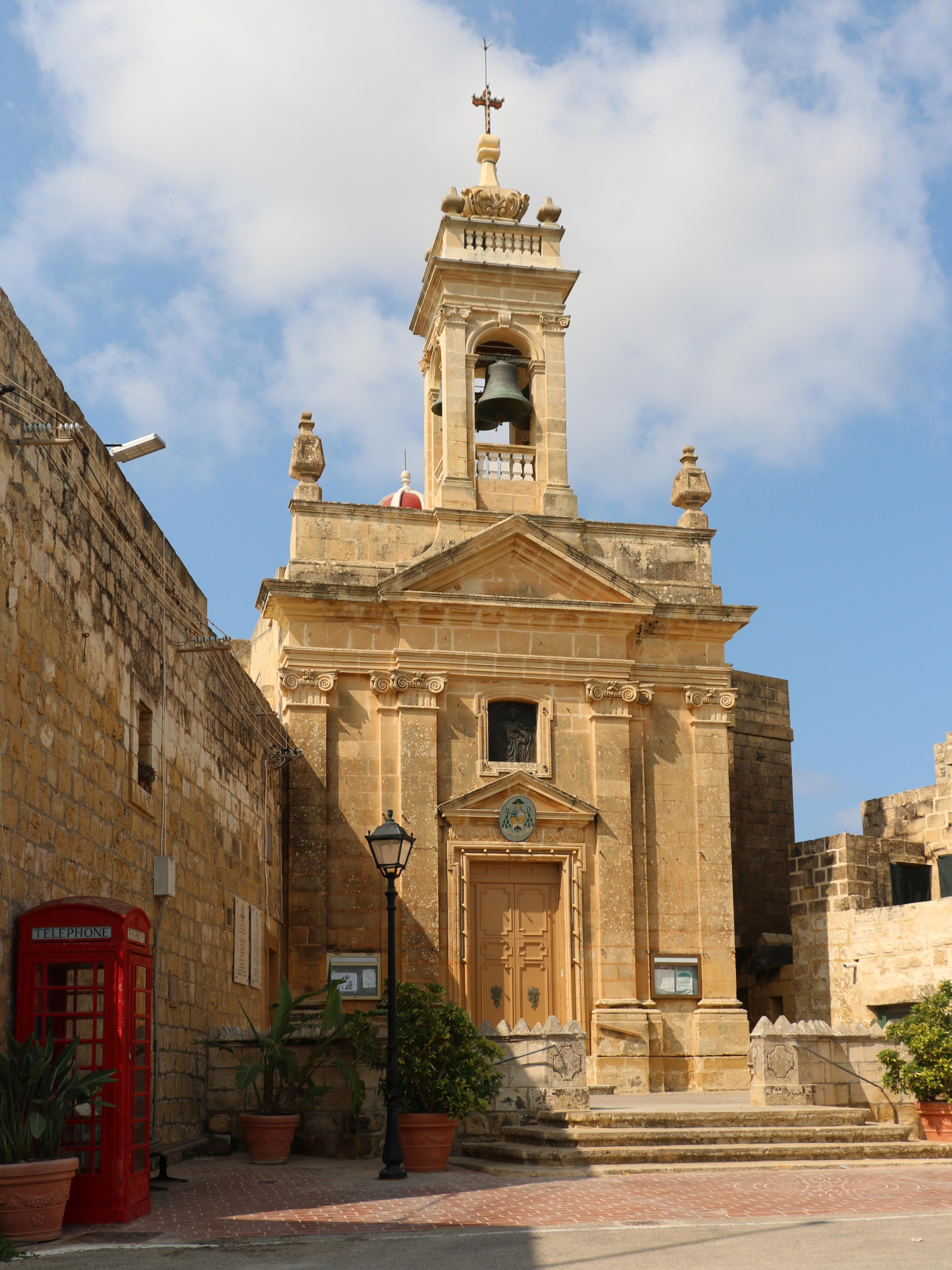

- Location within Malta
- 36°02′33.8″N 14°13′00.6″E
- Location: Santa Luċija, Gozo
- Country: Malta
- Denomination: Roman Catholic

History
- Status: Church
- Dedication: Saint Lucy
- Consecrated: November 9, 1952

Architecture
- Functional status: Active
- Architectural type: Church
- Style: Baroque

Administration
- Diocese: Gozo
- Parish: Kerċem

Clergy
- Bishop: Mario Grech
- Rector: Paul Cardona

Santa Lucia's Church is a rural small church located in a hamlet of Santa Luċija, Gozo, which hamlet was named after this church.

== Old chapel ==
This small church replaced a much smaller church which already existed by 1544. In 1544 the original chapel was deconsecrated. It was mentioned again in inquisitor Pietro Dusina's report when he visited the church in 1575 where he described the church as being in a devastating state since it has no rector, no doors and neither an altar. Dusina ordered the deconstruction of the church and that a cross should be built instead of it. However the local farmer decided to restore the chapel instead. It was finished by 1598. On his visit to the chapel in 1608, the Bishop of Malta Tomaso Gargallo recounts that he found a painting behind the altar and that the church was in use. However, by 1657 the chapel was deconsecrated for the third time.

== Present church ==
The chapel was rebuilt by a local priest Reverend Mikelang Dandalone by the end of the 18th century. The church gained quite an importance between 1848 and 1851, when it was made a vice-parish church as the main parish church of St Gregory in Kerċem was still under construction. The church was expanded between 1951 and 1952. The church was consecrated once more by Bishop Giuseppe Pace on November 9, 1952.

== Feast ==
The church celebrates the feast of Santa Lucia every year on the Sunday closest to December 13. Prior to 1990 the feast was only celebrated in the church not externally however in 1991 it was decided to organise external festivities which still take place till this day. These past few years, Scandinavian tradition of celebrating Santa Lucia's day have been incorporated in the local feast. On the eve of the feast 5 local girls dress as Lucia with candles on their head. A bonfire is lit in the square and the candles lit. The a procession follows to the church. Lucia buns are also made on the day. The main part of the feast is the procession with the statue of St Lucy, the work of Wistin Camilleri (1920), in the streets near the church.

== Works of art ==
The painting behind the high altar depicts Santa Lucia with a palm branch in her hands representing her martyrdom. The apse ceiling was painted by Ġużeppi Briffa in 1953. There are two side altars, one dedicated to Saints Peter and Paul and the other to the Flight into Egypt. The painting in the dome is the work of Austin Camilleri which was finished in 2004. It is quite different from the style of the church's interior but nevertheless it is still an impressive modern art.
