= Installation (Christianity) =

Christian liturgical act

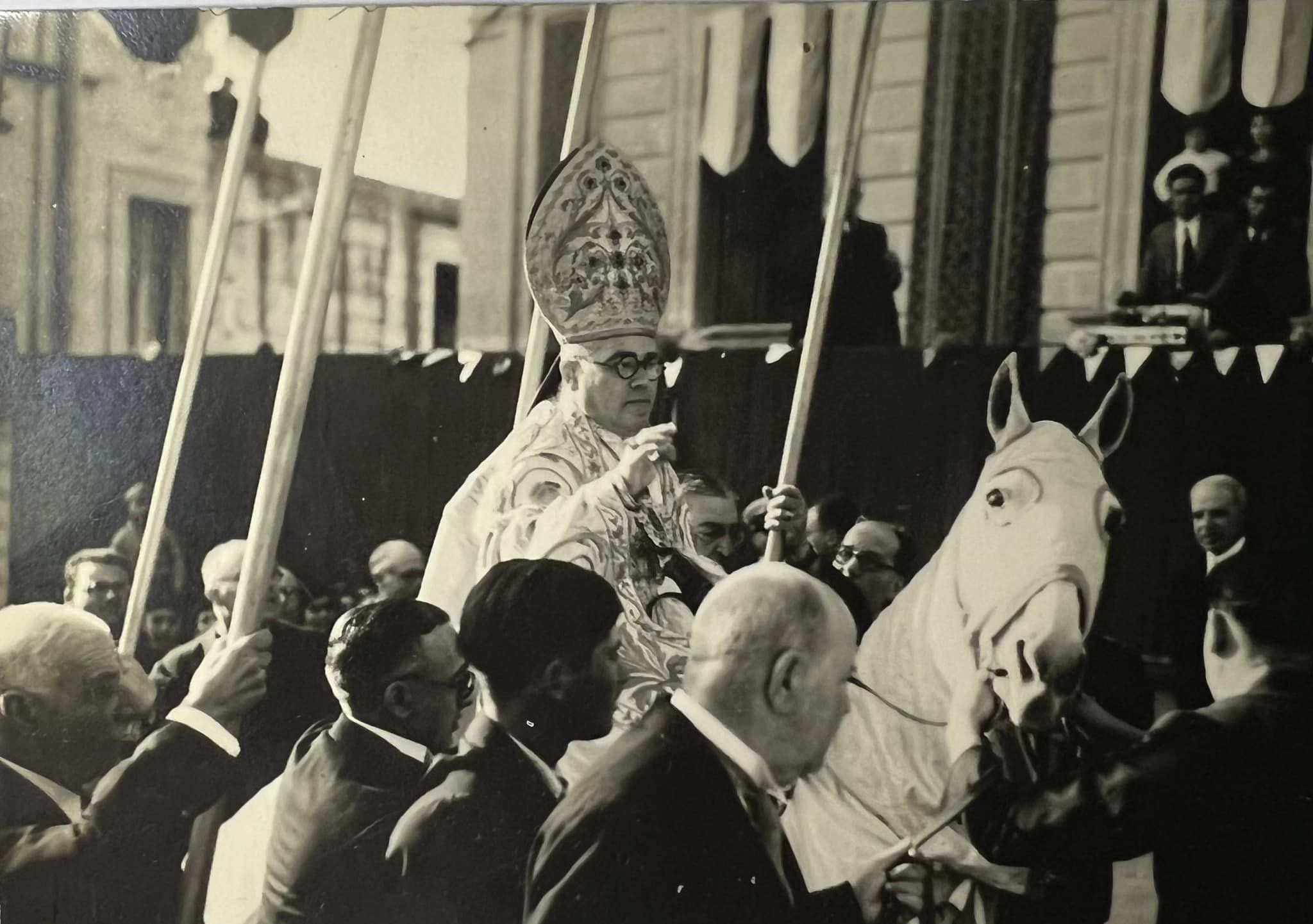
Giuseppe Pace being installed as bishop of Gozo, Malta on 8 April 1945

Installation is a Christian liturgical act that formally allows a cleric to assume the office of his appointed position at a particular place such as a cathedral. The term arises from the act of symbolically leading the prelate to their stall or throne within the cathedral or other place of worship (the word "cathedral" derives from the cathedra, the bishop's or archbishop's throne) representing the office of the position.

In the Catholic tradition, installations are carried out for bishops or archbishops who oversee a diocese or archdiocese known as canonical possession which ends the sede vacante period, not for coadjutor or auxiliary bishops. In the Anglican tradition, the term is additionally commonly used when inaugurating a new dean or canon.

== Enthronement ==
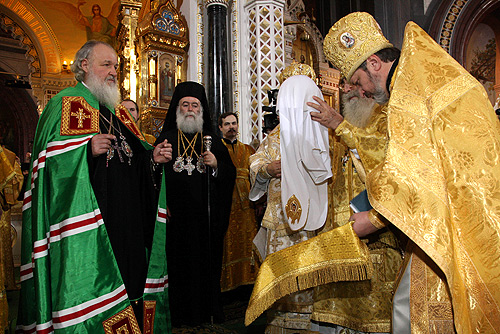
Enthronement of the Patriarch of Moscow and all Rus'.

Enthronements are most popular in religious settings, as a chair is seen as the symbol of the authority to teach. Thus in Christianity, bishops of almost all denominations have a ceremony of installation (or installment) after they assume office or by which they assume office. The Eastern Orthodox Church and the Oriental Orthodox Churches, as well as the Lutheran churches and the Anglican Communion often have elaborate ceremonies marking the inauguration of their episcopates. However, in the Catholic Church the rite of enthronement is limited to Eastern Catholic Churches. In these, enthronement is the rite by which a new bishop assumes authority over his eparchy and before which he is forbidden to intervene in its governance in any way, whether personally or by proxy. The overwhelmingly majority Latin Church of the Catholic Church has no ceremony of enthronement, although when a bishop is ordained in a church of the diocese he is to head, the principal consecrator invites him, after his investiture with mitre and crozier, to be seated on the cathedra of the church; if the ordination takes place elsewhere, the principal consecrator invites him merely to take first place among the concelebrating bishops. Instead of by enthronement, a Latin bishop takes office through an officially recorded presentation of the papal bull of his appointment, a ceremony that does not necessarily involve his personal presence. In the section in the Caeremoniale Episcoporum on "The Reception of a Bishop in His Cathedral Church" there is no mention of a ritual taking possession of the episcopal cathedra. The same is true even of older editions of this work.

=== Papal ===
Popes were traditionally enthroned and crowned with the papal tiara in the Archbasilica of Saint John Lateran. However, during the Avignon papacy the papacy could not make use of its cathedra, as the Pope was in France while the cathedral was in Rome. Thus the coronations continued, while enthronements could not take place until the Pontiffs' return to Rome. Upon the return of Pope Gregory XI to Rome, the Lateran Palace was badly in need of repair, so the Pope made the Vatican his residence and transferred coronations to Saint Peter's Basilica. However, the Lateran Basilica is the cathedral of Rome, so enthronements continued there, with brief interruptions (see prisoner in the Vatican).

Today, "a solemn ceremony of the inauguration of the pontificate" is held after the election of a pope and only later, "within an appropriate time", the new pope "take(s) possession of the Patriarchal Archbasilica of the Lateran, according to the prescribed ritual", which includes taking his seat upon the episcopal cathedra and which can therefore be considered a form of enthronement.
