= Basilica of the Nativity of Our Lady, Xagħra =

Basilica of the Nativity of Our Lady
- Knisja Kolleġġjata Bażilika ta' Marija Bambina
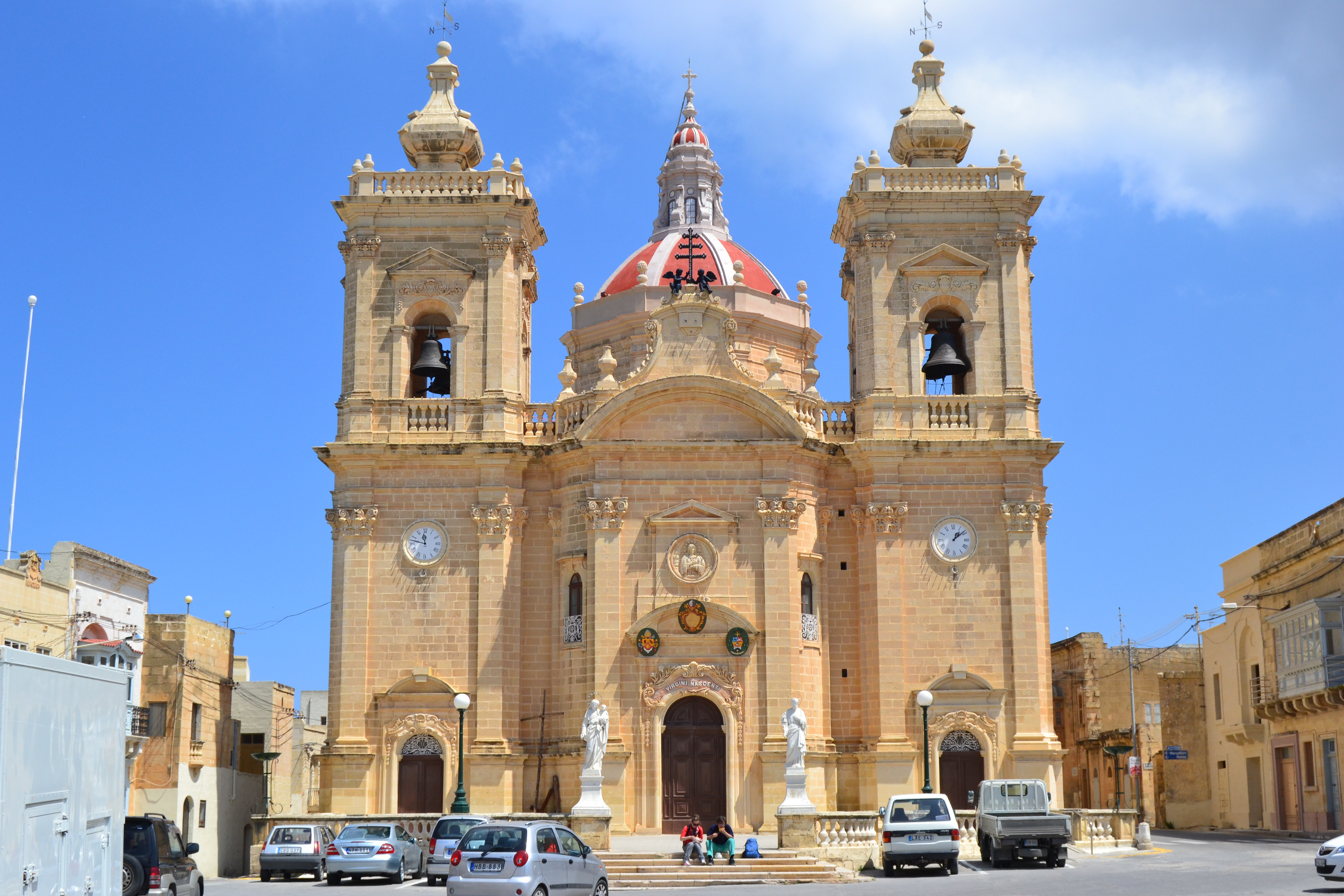
- The church's façade in 2011
- Basilica of the Nativity of Our Lady
- 36°3′1.1″N 14°15′54.1″E
- Location: Xagħra, Gozo, Malta
- Denomination: Roman Catholic
- Website: www.xaghraparish.org

History
- Status: Basilica, Collegiate church, Parish church
- Founded: 12 May 1692 (first church)
- Dedication: Nativity of Mary
- Consecrated: 26 May 1878

Architecture
- Functional status: Active
- Architect: Salv Bondin
- Style: Baroque
- Years built: 1815–1855; 1892 (dome)
- Construction cost: 70,000 scudi

Specifications
- Materials: Limestone

Administration
- Diocese: Gozo

The Basilica of the Nativity of Our Lady (Maltese: Knisja Kolleġġjata Bażilika ta' Marija Bambina) is a Roman Catholic parish church in Xagħra, Gozo, Malta, dedicated to the Nativity of Mary. The present building was constructed between 1815 and 1855, on the site of a smaller church which had been built in the 17th century. The dome was added in 1892. The church became a collegiate church in 1900, and a basilica in 1967.

== History ==
The first parish church of Xagħra was a chapel dedicated to St. Anthony the Abbot. It was built in the 13th century, and it became the village's parish church on 28 April 1688. The building still exists, although it has been considerably altered over the centuries.

In the late 17th century, a new parish church was constructed on the site of the present building. This was constructed at the request of Bishop Davide Cocco Palmieri, on land given by Grand Master Gregorio Carafa, with the aid of some Sicilians. The church was completed on 12 May 1692, and it was originally dedicated to Our Lady of Graces. It was rededicated to the Nativity of Mary on 9 October 1692. It also became commonly known as the church of Our Lady of Victory. The history of the altarpiece is uncertain, but it seems to have been brought from Senglea in 1744–51. The artist Carlo Zimech might have made some modifications for it to fit in its new location, although sometimes the entire work is attributed to him.

Xagħra's population continued to grow, and by the early 19th century the church had become too small to cater for the village. In 1813, the parish priest Vincenzo Cauchi donated 500 scudi for the construction of a new church, and encouraged the population to donate more funds. The church was designed by the canon Salv Bondin, Cauchi's nephew, who made the plans for free. It was to be built next to the old church, which would be demolished upon completion of the new building. Construction was suspended due to the outbreak of the plague in 1814, which killed 104 people in Xagħra, including Cauchi. The foundation stone was laid down on 2 October 1815 but progress was slow due to a lack of funds.

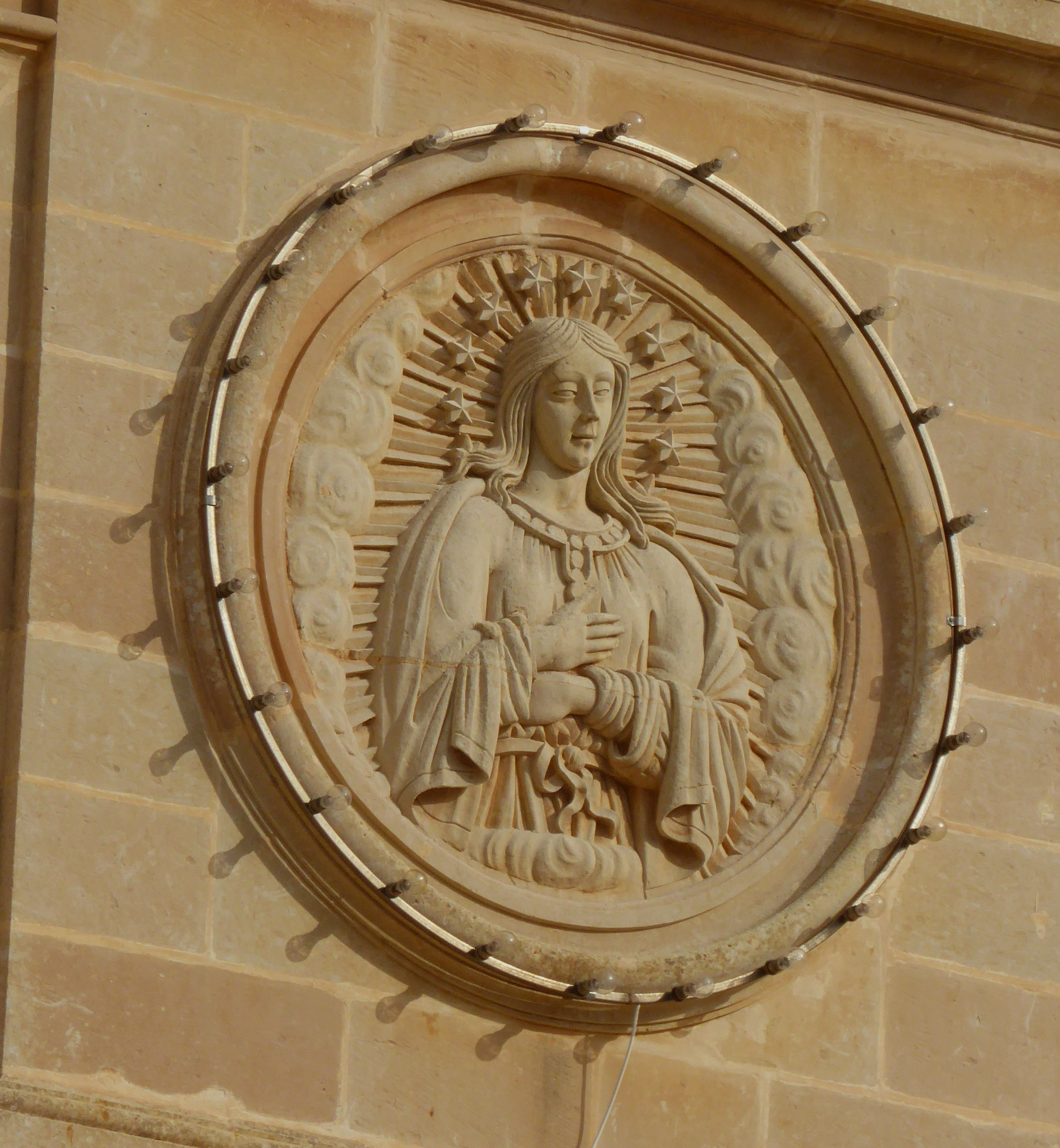
Relief of the Virgin Mary on the façade

When Michael Franciscus Buttigieg became Xagħra's parish priest, he contributed 2100 scudi for construction of the church. The Bishop of Malta, Publio Maria Sant, donated 4731 scudi, and another 1000 scudi were raised. By 1849, the choir, the façade, the lateral wall and one of the bell towers had been built. The old church was demolished on 20 November 1850, and part of the building began to be used for religious functions, being blessed on 10 August 1851. With the exception of the dome, the church was completed on 5 January 1855, and it was inaugurated on 14 February 1855. The total cost of construction was 70,000 scudi, 46,000 of which had been free labour by the population.

The church was consecrated on 26 May 1878 by the Bishop of Gozo, Pietro Pace. Construction of the dome began on 17 May 1892, and it was inaugurated on 25 October of the same year. The dome was built by Wiġi Vella from Żebbuġ, and the residents participated in its construction.

The church was given archipresbyterial status on 11 March 1893, and it became a collegiate church on 17 March 1900. It was given the title of basilica on 26 August 1967.

Some restoration works were undertaken between 2000 and 2003. They were supervised by the architect Saviour Micallef, and they included work on the bell towers and adding waterproofing to the roof and cupola.

The church building is listed on the National Inventory of the Cultural Property of the Maltese Islands.

== Architecture ==
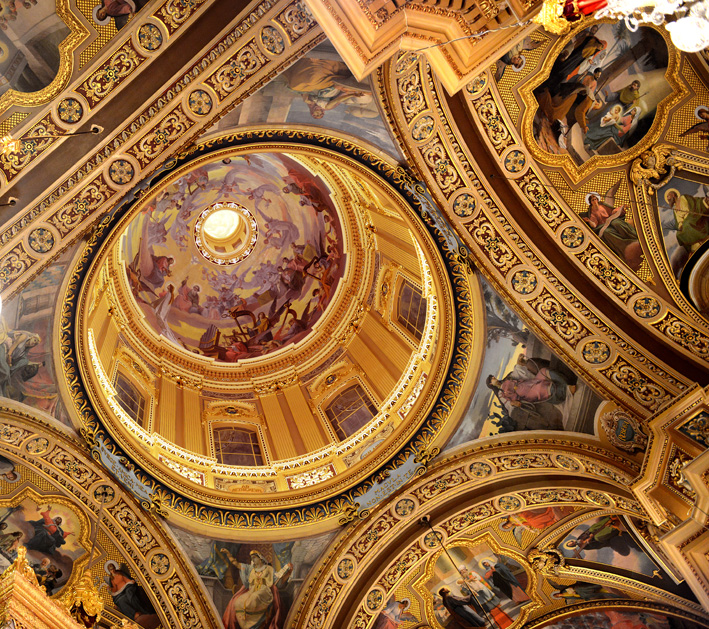
Interior view of the church's dome

The church's façade includes a high plinth, and it is divided into three bays, with the central one projecting outwards. Each bay contains a portal decorated with mouldings and segmented pediments. A roundel with a relief of the Virgin Mary, topped by a triangular pediment, is found above the central doorway. The central bay's upper tier contains another segmented arch, and an aedicule topped by a cross. The edges of each bay are decorated with pilasters having Ionic capitals.

The church has two bell towers, located at the upper tiers of the lateral bays. Each tower also includes a clock, found over the blank stonework of part of the façade. The church also has a dome.

A large parvis is located outside the church, and it includes two statues.

The church's interior is decorated with marble, and it also includes stained glass windows.
