= Maltese Episcopal Conference =

Catholic bishops' meeting in Malta

The Maltese Episcopal Conference (Maltese: Il-Konferenza Episkopali Maltija) is the official Catholic bishops' meeting in the Republic of Malta. Its president, as of 2024 is Charles J. Scicluna, the Archbishop of Malta.

The Conference of Bishops of Malta is a member of the Council of European Bishops' Conferences and the Commission of the Bishops' Conferences of the European Community.

== Members ==
In 2025, the members of the conference are:

- Archbishop Charles Scicluna (President and Archbishop of Malta)
- Bishop Anton Teuma, (Bishop of Gozo)
- Bishop Joseph Galea-Curmi (Auxiliary Bishop of Malta)

The secretary is Fr Jimmy Bonnici.

== Working bodies ==
The Conference has the following committees and administrative groups:

- Commission for Liturgical Affairs
- Commission for the Church in Malta and Europe
- Commission for Education
- Commission for the preservation of Christian culture
- National Council on Philanthropy and charitable assistance
- Council for the Promotion of the priestly vocation
- Office to investigate sexual abuse
- Regional court of second instance

== See also ==
- Catholic Church in Malta
- Culture of Malta
- History of Malta
- List of Churches in Malta
- Religion in Malta
