= Mario Grech =

Maltese Catholic cardinal (born 1957)

His Eminence Mario Grech
- Secretary General of the Synod of Bishops
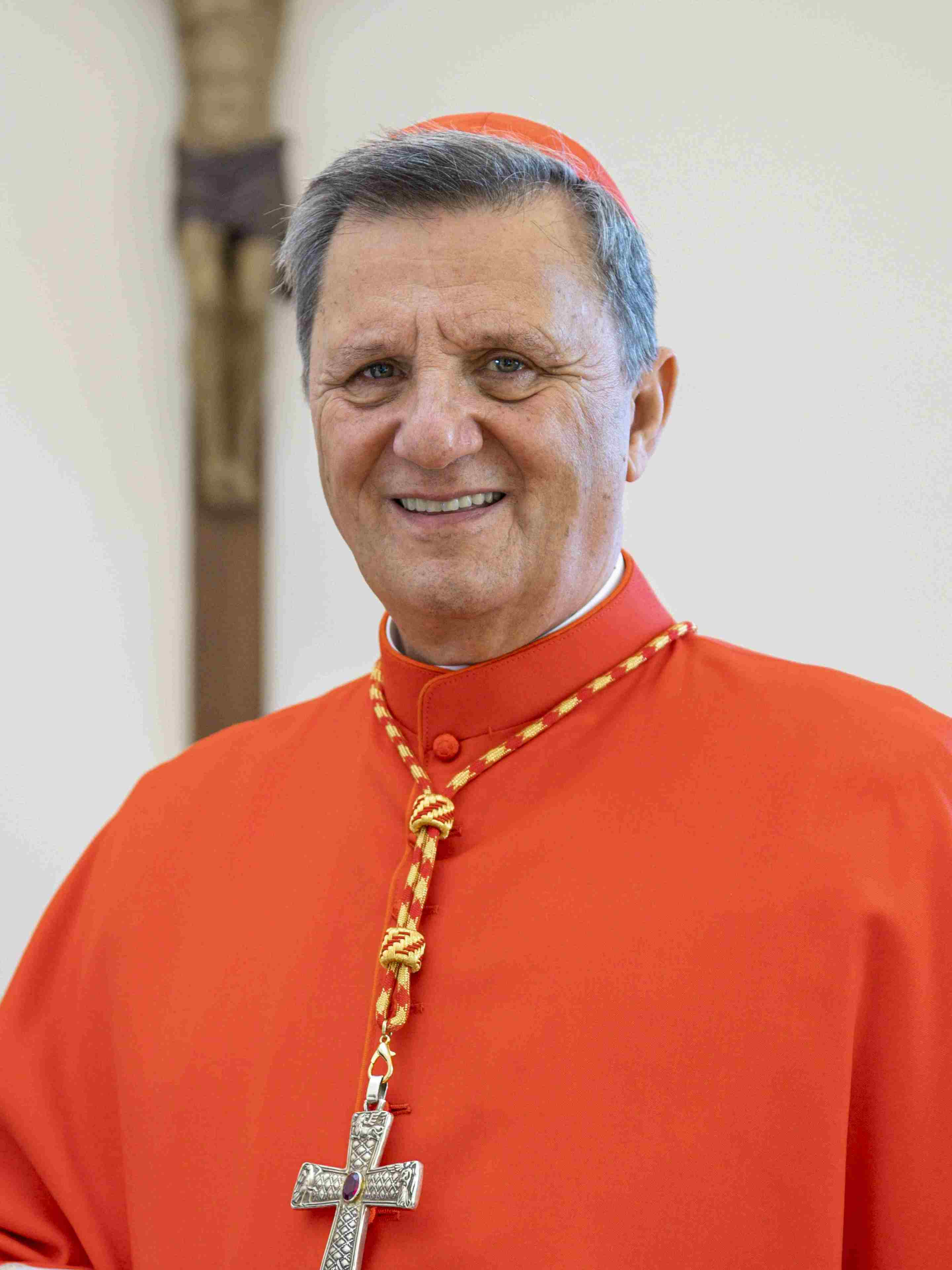
- Grech as a cardinal
- Church: Roman Catholic Church
- Appointed: 15 September 2020
- Predecessor: Lorenzo Baldisseri
- Other post: Cardinal-Deacon of Santi Cosma e Damiano (2020–present)
- Previous posts: Bishop of Gozo (2005–2019); President of the Maltese Episcopal Conference (2013–2016); Apostolic Administrator of Gozo (2019–2020)

Orders
- Ordination: 22 May 1984 by Nikol Joseph Cauchi
- Consecration: 22 January 2006 by Nikol Joseph Cauchi
- Created cardinal: 28 November 2020 by Francis
- Rank: Cardinal deacon

Personal details
- Born: Mario Grech; 20 February 1957 (age 69) Qala, Gozo, Crown Colony of Malta
- Denomination: Roman Catholic
- Parents: George and Stella Grech
- Education: Pontifical Lateran University; Pontifical University of Saint Thomas Aquinas
- Motto: In fractione panis ("In the breaking of the bread")
- Coat of arms: Mario Grech's coat of arms

Styles of Mario Grech
- Reference style: The Most Reverend Eminence; His Eminence
- Spoken style: Your Eminence
- Religious style: Bishop
- Informal style: Cardinal

Mario Grech (Maltese: [ˈmɐːrɪɔ ˈɡrɛk]; born 20 February 1957) is a Maltese Catholic prelate who has served as Secretary General of the Synod of Bishops since 2020. He was previously Bishop of Gozo from 2005 to 2019 and Pro-Secretary General of the Synod of Bishops from 2019 to 2020. Pope Francis raised him to the rank of cardinal on 28 November 2020.

== Early years ==
Mario Grech was born in Qala, Gozo, on 20 February 1957. His family moved to Ta' Kerċem when he was a young boy. He attended the Victoria high school and then studied philosophy and theology at the Gozo diocesan seminary. He was ordained a priest on 26 May 1984 by Bishop Nikol Joseph Cauchi. He then obtained a licenciate in civil law and canon law at the Pontifical Lateran University and a doctorate in canon law at the Pontifical University of Saint Thomas Aquinas.

He then fulfilled pastoral assignments at the Cathedral of Gozo, in the National Shrine of Ta' Pinu, and the parish of Kerċem. His responsibilities for the Diocese of Gozo included service as Judicial Vicar of the diocese, a member of the Metropolitan Court of Malta, teacher of canon law at the seminary, and a member of the College of Consultors, of the Presbyteral Council and of other diocesan commissions.

== Bishop of Gozo ==
On 26 November 2005, Pope Benedict XVI named him Bishop of Gozo. He received his episcopal consecration on 22 January 2006 from his predecessor in Gozo, Bishop Nikol Joseph Cauchi. In 2011, he joined other Maltese bishops in advising Catholics to defeat a referendum that would allow the legislature to consider legalizing divorce.

As president of the Episcopal Conference of Malta, he participated in the Synod of Bishops on the Family in 2014 and 2015. Speaking to the Synod in October 2014, Grech said that "the doctrine of the faith is capable of progressively acquiring a greater depth" and that addressing people in complex familial relations, or homosexuals or parents of homosexuals, "It is necessary to learn to speak that language which is known to contemporary human beings and who acknowledge it as a way of conveying the truth and the charity of the Gospel." With Archbishop Charles Scicluna of Malta, Grech co-authored the Maltese bishops' pastoral guidelines on Amoris Laetitia, released in January 2017, which stated that in certain cases a divorced Catholic who remarried might receive Communion after "honest discernment". The guidelines were republished in L'Osservatore Romano. (Note: The guidelines said: "If, as a result of the process of discernment, a separated or divorced person who is living in a new relationship manages, with an informed and enlightened conscience, to acknowledge and believe that he or she is at peace with God, he or she cannot be precluded from participating in the sacraments of Reconciliation and the Eucharist.")

In a December 2018 interview, he said he enjoyed discussions with atheists that sharpened his own beliefs and preferred dialogue to the confrontation his critics preferred. When asked about family and sexual issues he said:

If someone comes to me, asking me for help to discover Jesus Christ... he or she could be homosexual, and even in a homosexual relationship. It doesn't matter. I will not impede that person; on the contrary I would help. The last thing I would do is take up a position against that person.... Before, we would say: 'put your life in order first, and then we'll begin the journey towards God'. Today, on the other hand, we would say: 'Let us approach Jesus Christ... and Christ will help us put our lives in order.' ... 'Black' and 'white' still exist; but the grey area in-between has grown. It is in the grey areas that we must search. That's why I said that I am wary of those priests, or Christians, who feel they already know all the answers. No one can make that claim. We all have to continue searching.

== Roman Curia service ==
On 2 October 2019, Pope Francis named him Pro-Secretary General of the Synod of Bishops, in anticipation of succeeding Cardinal Lorenzo Baldisseri when he retired as secretary general. Grech worked alongside Baldisseri and participated as a member in the Synod of Bishops for the Pan-Amazon region. Grech was also the Apostolic Administrator of the Diocese of Gozo until 2020. He was one of five Synod officials who served ex officio on the fifteen-person commission that was responsible for drafting the final document of the Amazon Synod. In his first interview after his appointment he stated that "there is a movement toward which the Church can acquire a greater feminine face that would also reflect Mary's face". Grech succeeded Baldisseri on 15 September 2020.

On 4 July 2020, Pope Francis named Grech a member of the Pontifical Council for Promoting Christian Unity In October 2020, during the COVID-19 pandemic, Grech said:

It is of concern that someone feels lost outside of the Eucharistic or worship context, for it shows an ignorance of other ways of engaging with the mystery. This not only indicates that there is a certain spiritual illiteracy, but is proof of the inadequacy of current pastoral practice. It is very likely that in the recent past our pastoral activity has sought to lead to the sacraments and not to lead – through the sacraments – to Christian life.

On 25 October 2020, Pope Francis announced he would raise him to the rank of cardinal at a consistory scheduled for 28 November 2020. At that consistory, Pope Francis made him Cardinal-Deacon of Santi Cosma e Damiano. On 16 December, he was named a member of the Pontifical Council for Promoting Christian Unity.

On 21 June 2021, Pope Francis named him a member of the Supreme Tribunal of the Apostolic Signatura. On 13 July 2022, Pope Francis named him a member of the Dicastery for Bishops. In a 2024 interview, Cardinal Grech stated his belief in how synodality can help the Church move from "uniformity of thought" to "unity in difference".

Grech participated as a cardinal elector in the 2025 papal conclave. Prior to the conclave, he was widely considered to be papabile—a likely candidate for the papacy. The conclave ultimately elected Robert Francis Prevost as Pope Leo XIV.

== Honours ==
- Malta: Companion of the National Order of Merit
- Grand Cross Conventual Chaplain of the Sovereign Military Order of Malta
- Knight Grand Cross of the Order of the Holy Sepulchre

== See also ==
- Cardinals created by Pope Francis

== Notes ==
Catholic Church titles
| Preceded by Nikol Joseph Cauchi | Bishop of Gozo; 26 November 2005 – 2 October 2019 | Succeeded by Anthony Teuma |
| Preceded by Paul Cremona | President of the Maltese Episcopal Conference; September 2013 – 20 August 2016 | Succeeded by Charles Jude Scicluna |
| Preceded by Lorenzo Baldisseri | Secretary General of the Synod of Bishops; 15 September 2020 – | Incumbent |
| Preceded by Beniamino Stella | Cardinal-Deacon of Cosma e Damiano; 28 November 2020 – | Incumbent |
