= Antonius Grech Delicata Testaferrata =

Maltese bishop

The Right Reverend Antonius Grech Delicata Testaferrata
- Bishop of Gozo
- Church: Roman Catholic
- Diocese: Gozo
- Appointed: 24 September 1868
- In office: 1869-1876
- Predecessor: Michael Franciscus Buttigieg
- Successor: Pietro Pace
- Previous posts: Titular Bishop of Calydon (1867-1868); Apostolic Administrator of Gozo (1867-1868)

Orders
- Ordination: 19 October 1845
- Consecration: 14 July 1867 by Lodovico Altieri
- Rank: Bishop

Personal details
- Born: February 21, 1823 Valletta, Malta
- Died: December 31, 1876 (aged 53) Valletta, Malta

Antonius Grech Delicata Testaferrata (21 February 1823 – 31 December 1876) was a Maltese bishop who became the second Bishop of Gozo in 1868.

Grech Delicata Testaferrata was born in Valletta Malta on February 21, 1823, and was baptized in the Collegiate Parish Church of St Paul's Shipwreck in Valletta. He was ordained priest of the Diocese of Malta on October 19, 1845.

== Episcopacy ==
In 1867 Pope Pius IX appointed him as the Titular Bishop of Calydon. Grech Delicata Testaferrata was consecrated by Cardinal Lodovico Altieri on July 14, 1867, in the chapel of Villa Lante al Gianicolo in Rome. On November 16 of the same year he was appointed as the Apostolic Administrator of Gozo. He succeeded Paolo Micallef as administrator who was later appointed as Archbishop of Pisa in 1871. The see of Gozo was vacant for two years after the death of its bishop Michael Franciscus Buttigieg. It was in 1868 that Bishop Grech Delicata Testaferrata was appointed as the official bishop of the Bishop of Gozo. He was formally installed in the cathedral on January 24, 1869. He spent the remaining seven years as the Bishop of Gozo until 31 December 1876 when he died in Valletta.
