= Cathedral of the Assumption, Victoria =

The Matrix, Parish Church, Sanctuary, Collegiate and Cathedral of the Assumption of the Blessed Virgin Mary into Heaven
- Parrocca Matrici, Arcipretali, Santwarju, Kollegjata Insinji u Katidral ta' Santa Marija Assunta
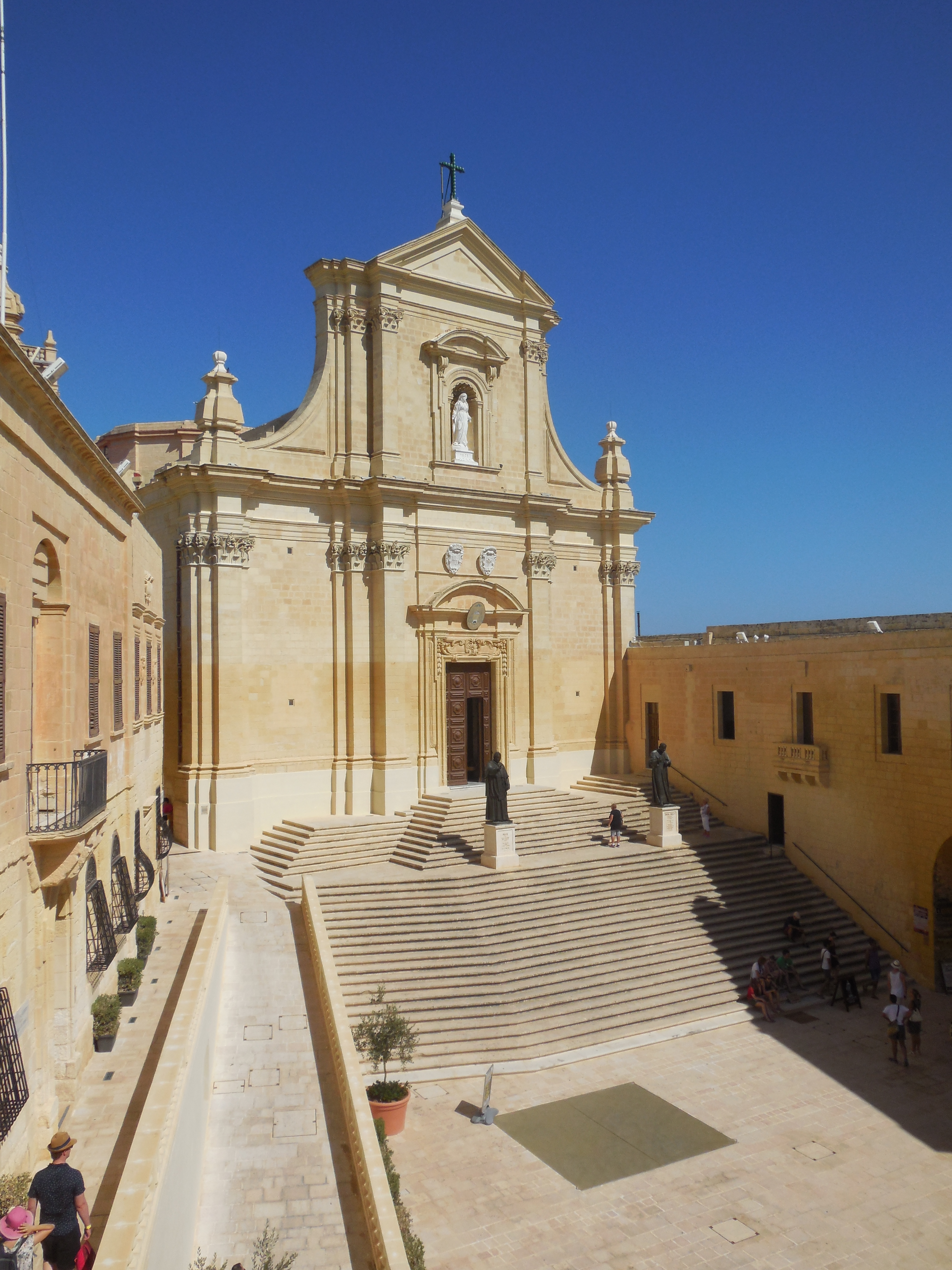
- The cathedral's façade in 2017
- The Matrix, Parish Church, Sanctuary, Collegiate and Cathedral of the Assumption of the Blessed Virgin Mary into Heaven
- 36°2′46.4″N 14°14′24.1″E
- Location: Victoria, Gozo, Malta
- Denomination: Roman Catholic
- Website: https://www.gozocathedral.mt/

History
- Status: Cathedral
- Dedication: October 11 1716
- Dedicated: 11 October 1716
- Consecrated: October 11 1716

Architecture
- Functional status: Active
- Architect: Lorenzo Gafà
- Architectural type: Church
- Style: Baroque
- Years built: 1697–1711

Specifications
- Capacity: 400 to 500 people
- Materials: Limestone

Administration
- Province: Malta
- Metropolis: Archdiocese of Malta
- Diocese: Diocese of Gozo

Clergy
- Bishop: Anton Teuma

The Cathedral of the Assumption of the Blessed Virgin Mary into Heaven (Maltese: Katidral ta' Santa Marija Assunta) is a Roman Catholic cathedral in the Cittadella of Victoria in Gozo, Malta. The cathedral is dedicated to the Assumption of Mary, and has been the seat of the Roman Catholic Diocese of Gozo since the formation of the diocese in 1864.

== History ==
The Cittadella was initially a pre-historic settlement and later a Roman temple dedicated to Juno was developed, and the remains of this temple existed until the present day as part of the cathedral. Following the Christianization of Malta and Gozo, the temple was converted into a church dedicated to the Virgin Mary. Later on, a Byzantine church was probably built on the site of the temple, until it was destroyed while Malta was under Arab rule.

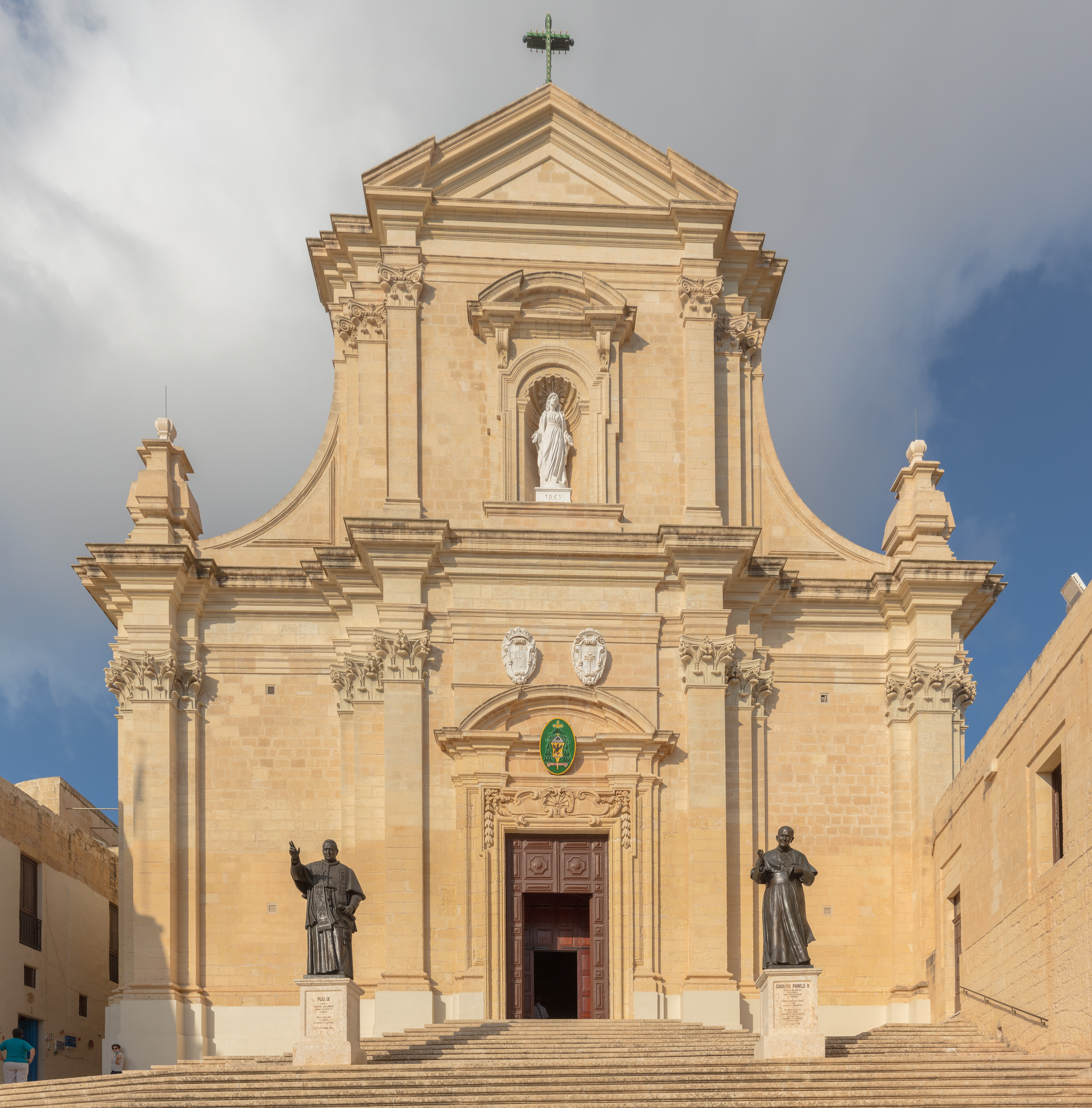
The cathedral's façade

Following the expulsion of the Arabs, another church was built. The earliest reference to a parish church within the Cittadella dates back to 1299, and it was enlarged over the course of the 15th and 16th centuries. The church was sacked by the Ottomans during the invasion of 1551, but was reopened by September 1554. It was damaged once again in the earthquake of 1693, and a decision was made to demolish the old building and construct a new church instead.

The nobleman Felice Axac was a major benefactor in the church's reconstruction. The foundation stone of the present church was laid down on 21 September 1697, and the building was designed by the Maltese architect Lorenzo Gafà. It was inaugurated on 14 August 1711, and was dedicated on 11 October 1716.

The church was elevated to a cathedral when it became the seat of the Roman Catholic Diocese of Gozo, on 16 September 1864.

The building is listed on the National Inventory of the Cultural Property of the Maltese Islands.

== Architecture ==
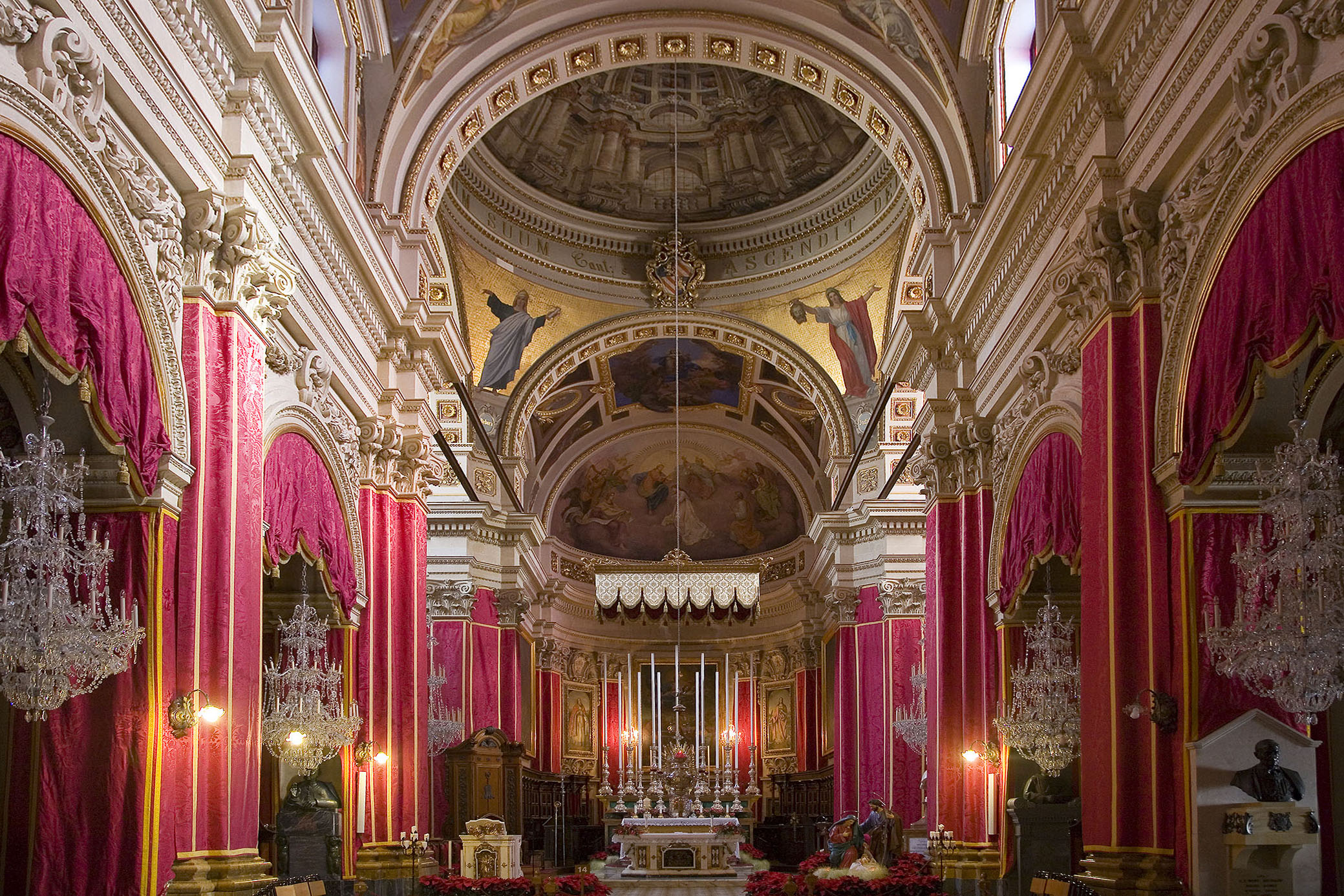
Interior of the cathedral, with the trompe-l'œil painting of the dome visible

The cathedral is built in Baroque architecture, and its groundplan has the shape of a Latin cross. The building's façade is similar to that of the Church of the Gesù in Rome. The cathedral has a bell tower on its north-east side.

The interior of the cathedral is well-proportioned, containing pilasters raised on tall platforms. The building has an aperture for a dome, but this is roofed over with a flat ceiling containing a trompe-l'œil painting.

== Cathedral Museum ==
The Cathedral Museum is housed in a building with a plain façade located behind the church.
