= Ninu's Cave =

Cave in Malta

- Location within Malta
- Location: Xagħra, Gozo, Malta
- Coordinates: 36°03′04.5″N 14°15′53.2″E
- Discovery: 1888
- Access: Open to the public
- Lighting: Electric

Ninu's Cave is a cave in Xagħra, Gozo, Malta. Ninu's Cave was discovered by local resident Joseph Rapa in 1888 while digging a well under a private house. Ninu's Cave is not far from another underground feature, Xerri's Grotto, also discovered when a well was being dug under a private house.

The cave is formed in upper coralline limestone. It has many natural stalactites and stalagmites, and also a few helictites. Many of these formations are dry, with the same colour as the surrounding rock, but a few are semi-transparent.

It also had soda straws, but these have been broken off.

The cave is entered by a 4m descent down a spiral staircase, which ends in a large chamber of approximately 20m by 8m. Ninu's Cave is illuminated by electric lights, and is open to the public all year round.
