= Santa Luċija, Gozo =

Santa Luċija
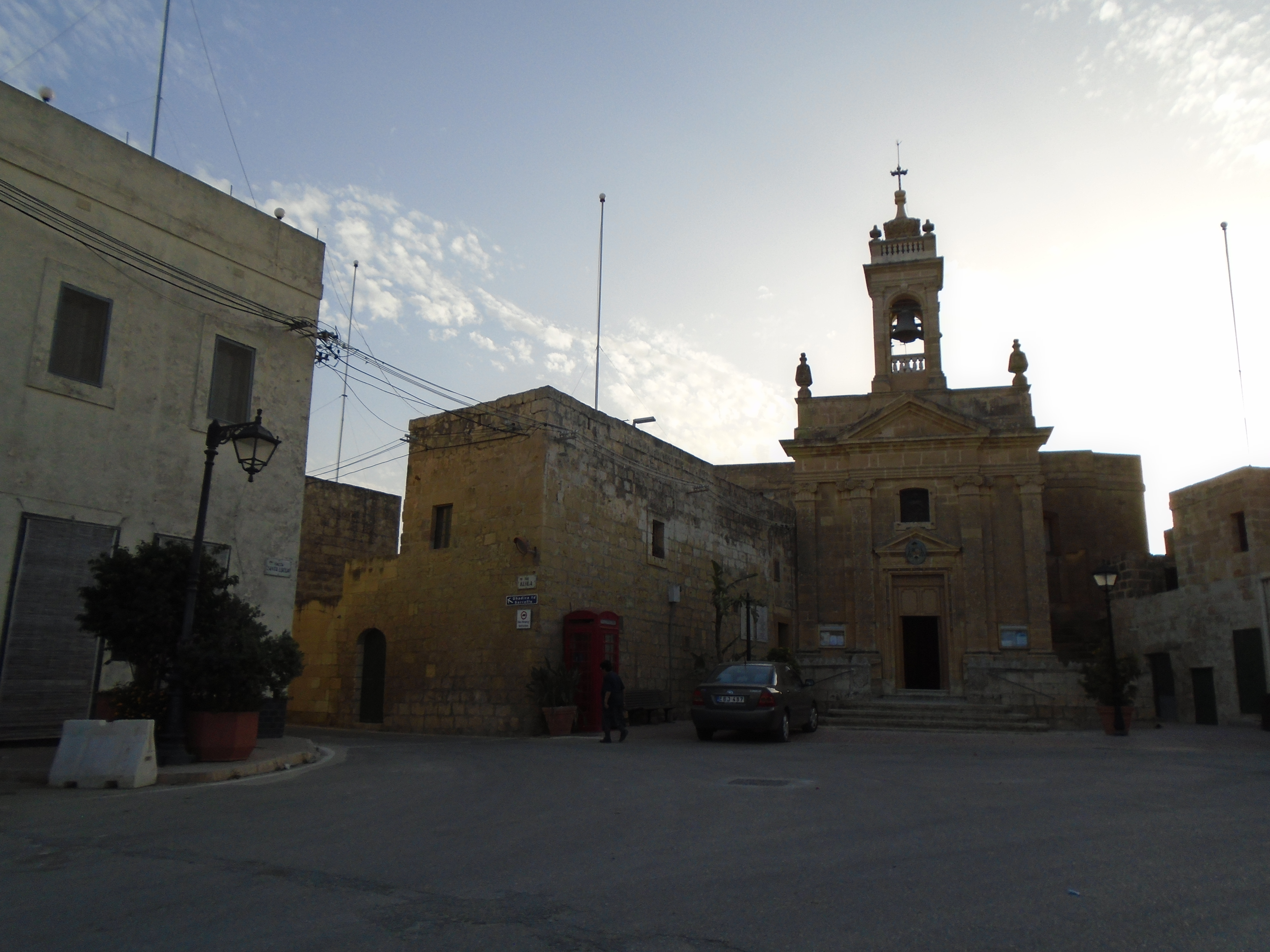
- St Lucy's church in the main square
- Motto: Civibus Lucem Ingeni (I Implant Light In Fellow Citizens)
- Interactive map of Santa Luċija
- Coordinates: 36°02′36″N 14°13′03″E
- Country: Malta
- Region: Gozo Region
- District: Gozo and Comino District
- Time zone: UTC+1 (CET)
  - Summer (DST): UTC+2 (CEST)
- Postal code: KCM
- Dialing code: 356
- ISO 3166 code: MT-22
- Patron saints: Saint Lucy
- Website: santalucija.com

Santa Luċija is a hamlet in Kerċem, in Gozo Island, Malta.

The hamlet takes its name from the church situated in the middle of the hamlet. The original chapel dedicated to St Lucy was recorded by inquisitor Pietro Dusina in 1575 during his apostolic visitation. Santa Luċija is inhabited by country folk with a few old houses built around the church. The local feast in honour of Saint Lucy is celebrated every year on the Sunday closest to the 13th of December, the liturgical feats day of the saint. It has also become a tradition to celebrate the feast day by the Lucia procession or Festival of Light, typical to Scandinavian countries, particularly Sweden. Lucia buns are also made on this day. Santa Luċija is unique in Gozo, with its picturesque square and traditions. The village square is marked by a traditional stone cross. The village is right next door to Kercem and boasts some stunning countryside. The area was once known for its fresh water springs and is still one of the greenest areas on Gozo.

Santa Luċija is bordered by Victoria and Kerċem. Accessible from the hamlet is the Ghajn Abdul plateau which goes up to Mixta caves, the site of the earliest settlement in Gozo. One can also access the Saint Raphael Lake and from there, a path in the fields parallel to the cliffs leads to Ras il-Wardija, the site of a Punic settlement that included a small temple.
