= Xerri's Grotto =

Cave in Malta

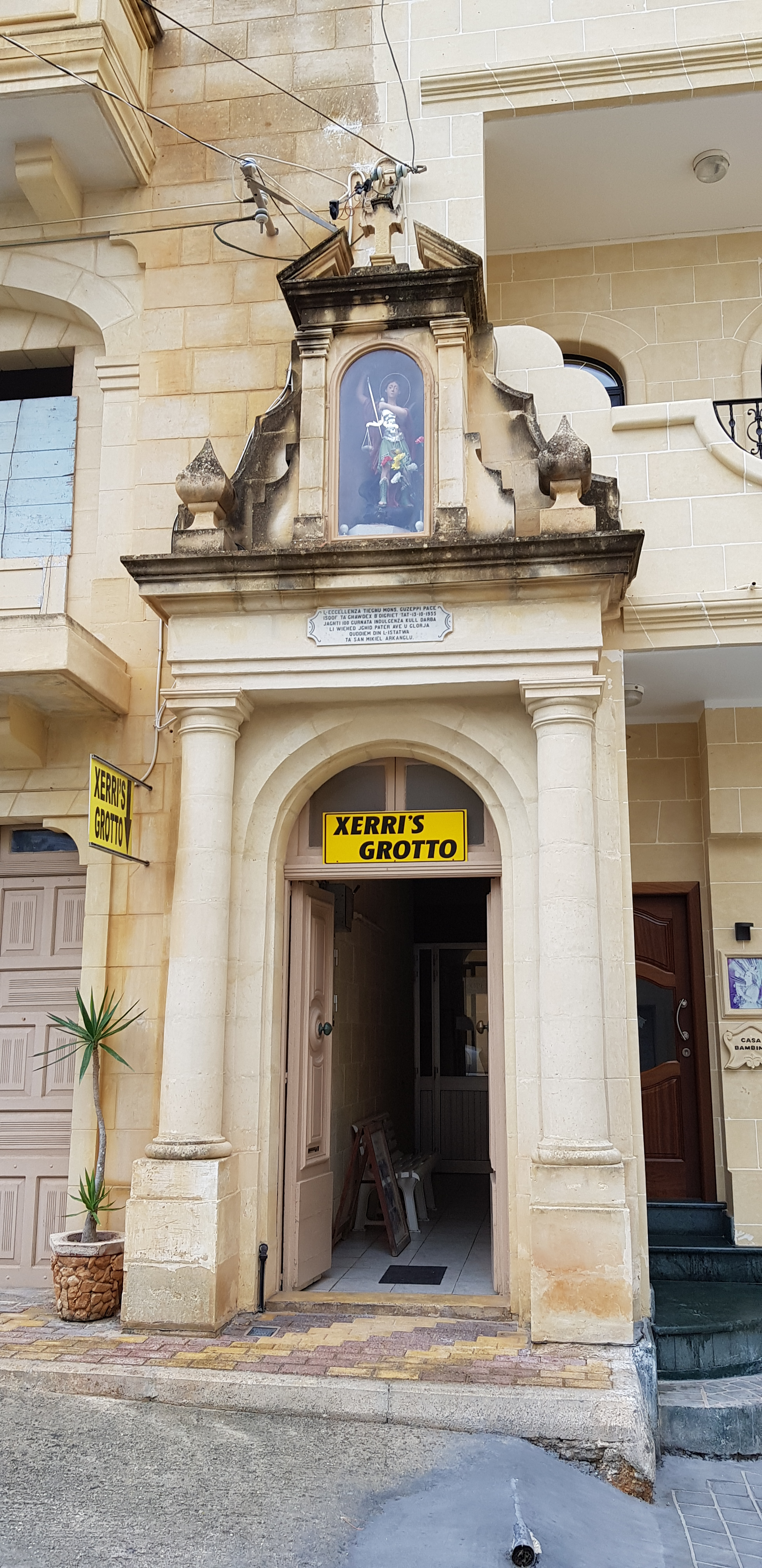
- Entrance to Xerri's Grotto

- Location within Malta
- Location: Xagħra, Gozo, Malta
- Coordinates: 36°03′04.5″N 14°15′40.9″E
- Discovery: 1923 or 1924
- Access: Open to the public
- Lighting: Electric

Xerri's Grotto is a cave in Xagħra, Gozo, Malta. It was discovered by local resident Anthony Xerri in 1923 or 1924 while digging a well under a private house. Xerri's Grotto is not far from another underground feature, Ninu's Cave, which was discovered in 1888 in a similar fashion, when a well was being dug under a private house.

The grotto is larger than Ninu's Cave. It contains various calcified formations, including stalactites and stalagmites, some of which resemble a tortoise, a vulture, giraffes or elephant's ears. Some other formations which developed as a result of the calcification of tree roots can also be seen.

The entrance to the cave is down a 10m spiral staircase, built into the original well shaft. The cave was extended during World War II, when the family used it as an air raid shelter.

Today, the cave is illuminated by electric lights, and is open to the public with tours being given by the owners of the house.
