= Anton Teuma =

Gozitan prelate of the Catholic Church (born 1964)

His Excellency, The Most Reverend Anthony Teuma
- Bishop of Gozo
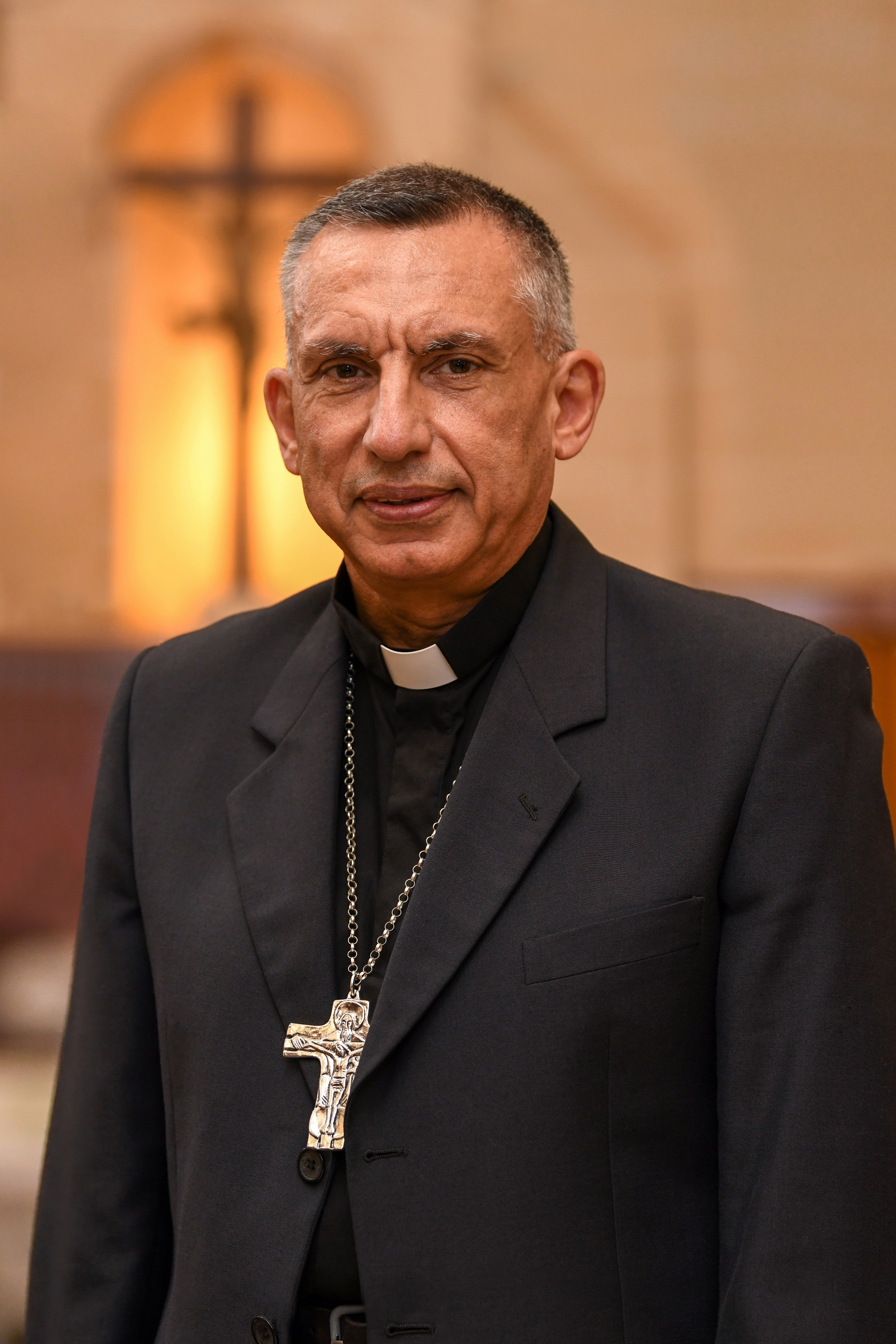
- Church: Catholic Church
- Diocese: Diocese of Gozo
- Appointed: 17 June 2020
- Installed: 16 September 2020
- Predecessor: Mario Grech

Orders
- Ordination: 25 June 1988 by Nikol Ġużeppi Cauchi
- Consecration: 21 August 2020 by Mario Grech; Charles Scicluna (co-consecrator); Alessandro D'Errico (co-consecrator)

Personal details
- Born: 11 January 1964 (age 62) Xagħra, Malta
- Denomination: Roman Catholic
- Motto: "Baqa' miexi magħhom" "And He walked along with them (Luke 24:15)"
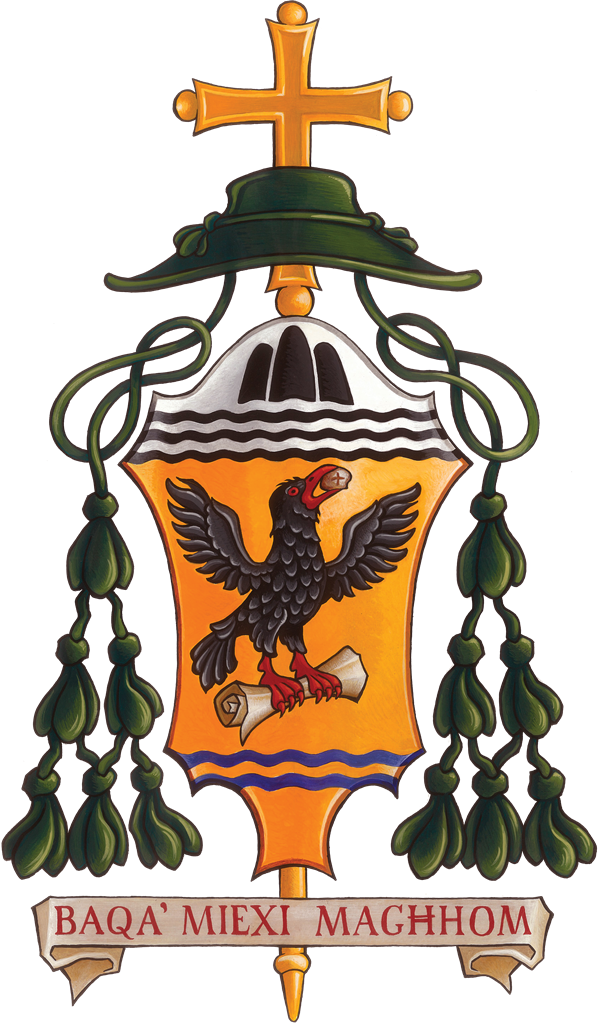
- Coat of arms

Styles of Anthony Teuma
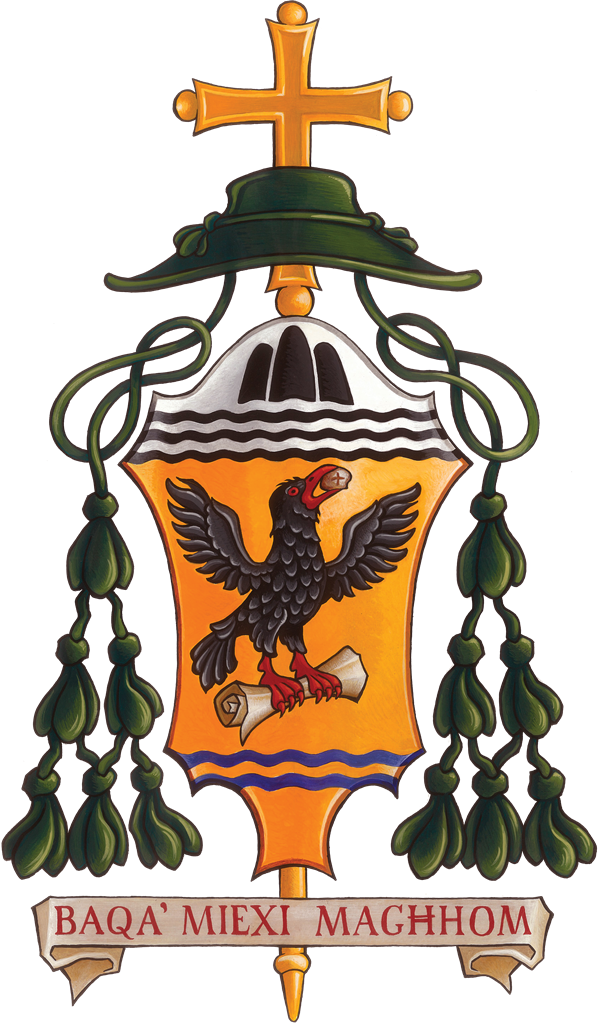
- Reference style: The Most Reverend; His Excellency
- Spoken style: Your Excellency
- Religious style: Bishop

Anthony Teuma (born 11 January 1964) is a Maltese prelate of the Catholic Church who serves as the Bishop of Gozo.

== Biography ==
Anton Teuma was born in Xagħra, Gozo, Malta, on 11 January 1964. After secondary school at the diocesan minor seminary, he completed his studies in philosophy and theology at the major seminary in Gozo. He also worked in Australia and earned licences as a welder and electrician. He obtained his doctorate in educational sciences from the Salesian Pontifical University. He was ordained a priest on 25 June 1988 for the Diocese of Gozo by Nikol Cauchi, Bishop of Gozo.

He remained in Rome until 1997 working as parish vicar of Saint Ignatius of Antioch (1988-1995); spiritual director at the Pontifical Roman Seminary (1995-1997); Responsible and Spiritual Assistant of the Eucharistic Communities of the Diocese of Rome (1996-1997).

Returning to Gozo, he was Rector of the Major Seminary of Gozo from 1997 to 2007. After a sabbatical year in the Holy Land where he earned a diploma in biblical studies, he was Head and Spiritual Assistant of the Eucharistic Communities of the Diocese of Gozo from 1998 to 2015.

He has been Episcopal Delegate for the Family and Head of the John Paul II Family Institute in Gozo. From 1997 to 2020 he has been a member of the College of Consultors and of the Presbyteral and Pastoral Councils of the Diocese.

Pope Francis appointed him Bishop of Gozo on 17 June 2020.

Catholic Church titles
Preceded by Mario Grech	Bishop of Gozo; 17 June 2020 –	Succeeded by incumbent
