= Basilica of the Visitation, Għarb =

Basilica of the Visitation
- The Basilica and Collegiate Parish church of the Visitation of Our Lady
- Il-Bażilika u Kolleġġjata tal-Viżitazzjoni
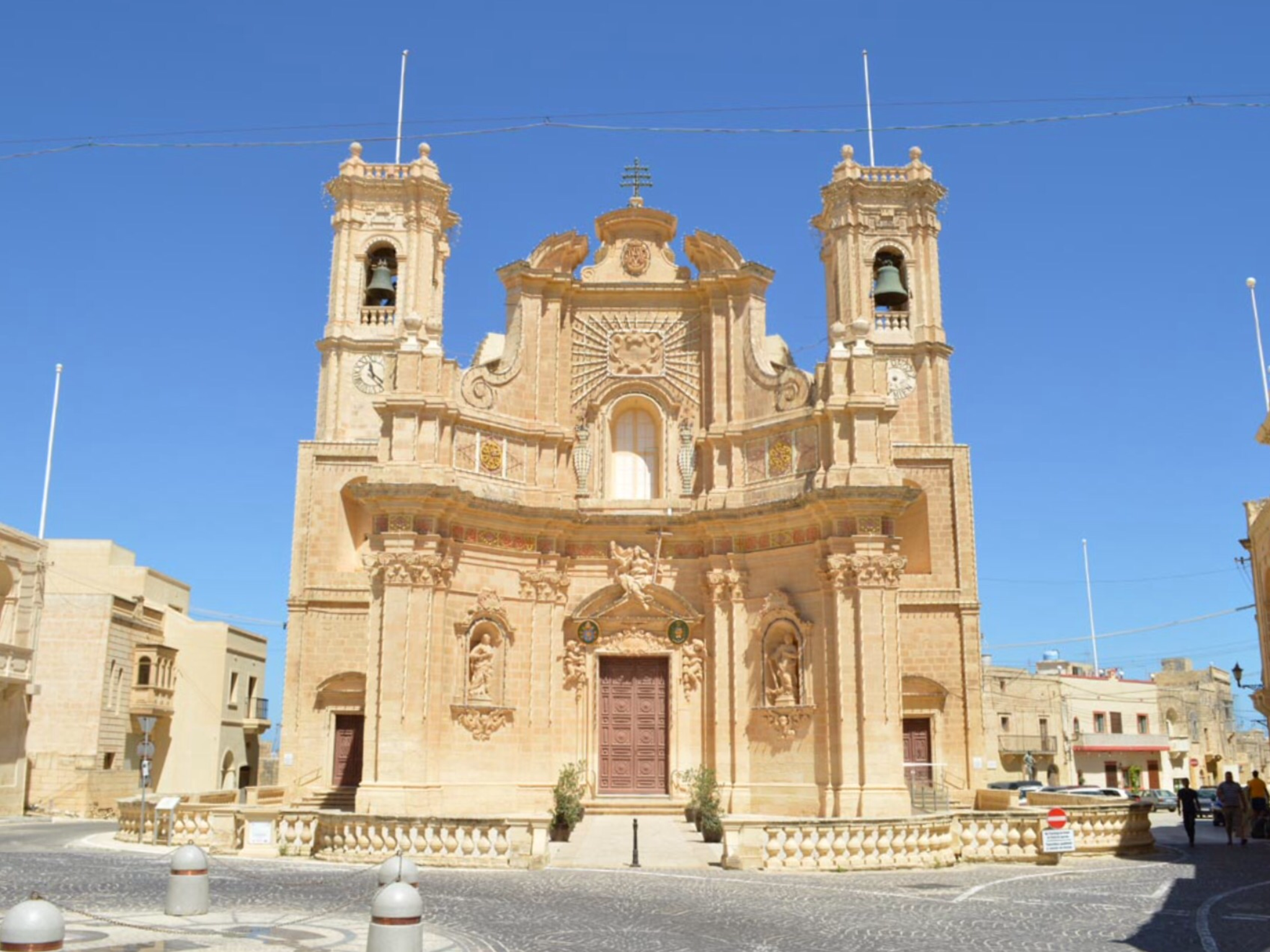
- Basilica of the Visitation
- 36°03′36.9″N 14°12′32.1″E
- Location: Għarb, Gozo, Malta
- Denomination: Roman Catholic

History
- Status: Active
- Founded: 1699
- Dedication: Visitation
- Consecrated: 28 September 1755

Architecture
- Functional status: Collegiate Parish church
- Architectural type: Church
- Style: Baroque
- Completed: 1729

Administration
- Diocese: Gozo
- Parish: Għarb

The Basilica of the Visitation is a baroque, collegiate parish church located in the western part of the island of Gozo in the village of Għarb.

== History ==
Għarb became an independent parish on 29 August 1679 by Bishop Michael Molina. It was the second parish to be established outside Victoria. The first parish church was that of the Visitation located downhill to the present church. The original parish church, also known as Taż-Żejt, is located beside the village cemetery. Since the population of the village grew it was decided to build a bigger church in a more central part of the village. The present church was built between 1699 and 1729. It has an elegant façade which has been compared with Francesco Borromini's Church of Saint Agnes in Piazza Navona, Rome. The church was consecrated on 28 September 1755. The church became the second Collegiate of Gozo on 19 May 1774 and was elevated to the status of a minor Basilica on 28 November 1967. Once the church became a minor basilica in 1967 by Pope Paul VI, it acquired the Umbraculum and the Tintinnabulum. These two items, as can be seen in the photo, are carried in the procession in which the collegiate chapter of the church participates in. Also the same image on the left shows the coat of arms of both the Diocese and the incumbent Pope. A Minor Basilica has the privilege of including the Pope's coat of arms over the church's main door.

The church building is listed on the National Inventory of the Cultural Property of the Maltese Islands.

== See also ==
- Culture of Malta
- History of Malta
- List of Churches in Malta
- Religion in Malta
