= Michael Franciscus Buttigieg =

Maltese prelate

The Right Reverend Michael Franciscus Buttigieg
- Bishop of Gozo
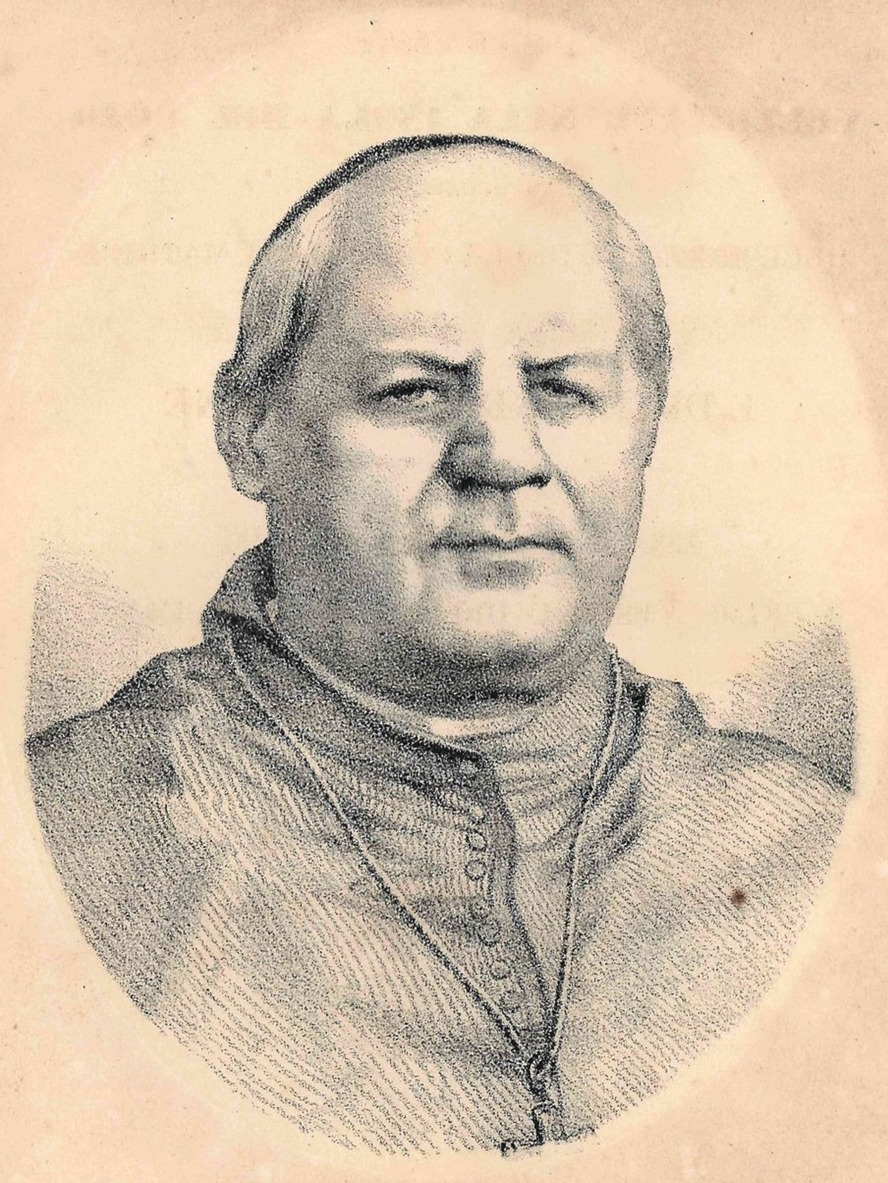
- Church: Roman Catholic
- Diocese: Gozo
- Appointed: 22 September 1864
- In office: 1864-1866
- Successor: Antonius Grech Delicata Testaferrata
- Previous post: Auxiliary Bishop of Malta (1863-1864)

Orders
- Ordination: 21 December 1816
- Consecration: 3 May 1863 by Niccola Paracciani Clarelli
- Rank: Bishop

Personal details
- Born: November 3, 1793 Qala, Malta
- Died: July 12, 1866 (aged 72) Victoria, Gozo, Malta
- Buried: Gozo Cathedral

Michael Franciscus Buttigieg (3 November 1793 – 12 July 1866) was a Maltese prelate who became the first Bishop of Gozo in 1864.

Buttigieg was born on November 3, 1793, in Qala, Gozo, Malta and baptized in St Peter and St Paul parish church of Nadur (Qala was at the time part of the Nadur parish). He was ordained priest on December 21, 1816. Some years later, in 1863, he was appointed as the Auxiliary Bishop of Malta. He was consecrated by Cardinal Niccola Paracciani Clarelli on May 3, 1863, in the church of Santissima Trinità Montecitorio in Rome. Buttigieg was assigned the titular see of Lete.

A year later, in 1864, Pope Pius IX created the Diocese of Gozo and Buttigieg was appointed as its first bishop. He took charge of the diocese on October 23, 1864. Two years later Bishop Buttigieg died in Victoria, Gozo on July 12, 1866, at the age of 72. He is buried in the Cathedral of the Assumption in Victoria, Gozo.
