= Paolo Micallef =

Maltese prelate

His Excellency Paolo Micallef O.S.A.
- Archbishop of Pisa; Primate of Corsica and Sardinia
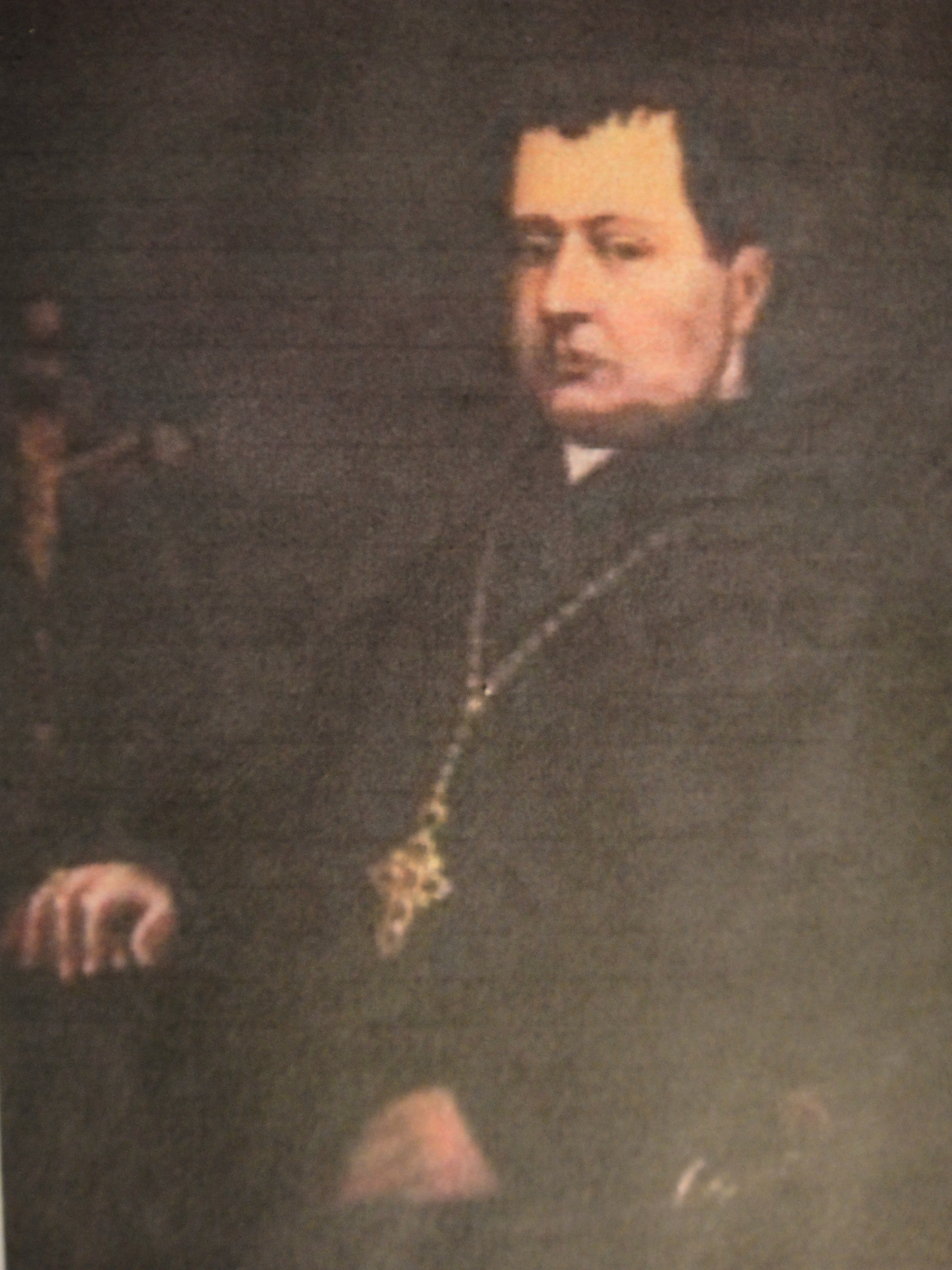
- Native name: Pawlu Micallef
- Church: Roman Catholic
- Archdiocese: Pisa
- Appointed: 27 October 1871
- In office: 1871-1883
- Predecessor: Cardinal Cosimo Corsi
- Successor: Ferdinando Capponi
- Previous post: Bishop of Città di Castello (1864-1871)

Orders
- Ordination: 6 March 1841
- Consecration: 10 January 1864 by Costantino Patrizi Naro
- Rank: Metropolitan Archbishop

Personal details
- Born: 15 May 1818 Valletta, Malta
- Died: 8 March 1883 (aged 64) Pisa, Italy
- Buried: Pisa Cathedral

Paolo Micallef (15 May 1818 - 8 March 1883) was a Maltese prelate who served as Archbishop of Pisa from 1871 until his death in 1883.

Pawlu Micallef was born in Valletta Malta on 15 May 1818. He joined the Augustinian Order and was ordained priest on 6 March 1841. Pope Pius IX appointed him as Vicar General of the Order in 1855. He was confirmed later in 1859. He served in this post until 1865. On 21 December 1863 Micallef was appointed as the Bishop of Città di Castello in Umbria.

He was consecrated bishop on 10 January 1864 in Rome by Cardinal Costantino Patrizi Naro. In 1866, he was appointed as the Apostolic Administrator of the Diocese of Gozo in Malta after the death of its bishop, Michael Francis Buttigieg. He held this post for two years until Antonio Grech Delicata was appointed as the new bishop of Gozo. In 1871 Bishop Micallef was appointed as the Archbishop of Pisa, replacing Cosimo Corsi after his death He was one of the bishops who participated in the First Vatican Council which began in 1869 till 1870. Archbishop Micallef died in Pisa on 8 March 1883 and was buried in the Cathedral.

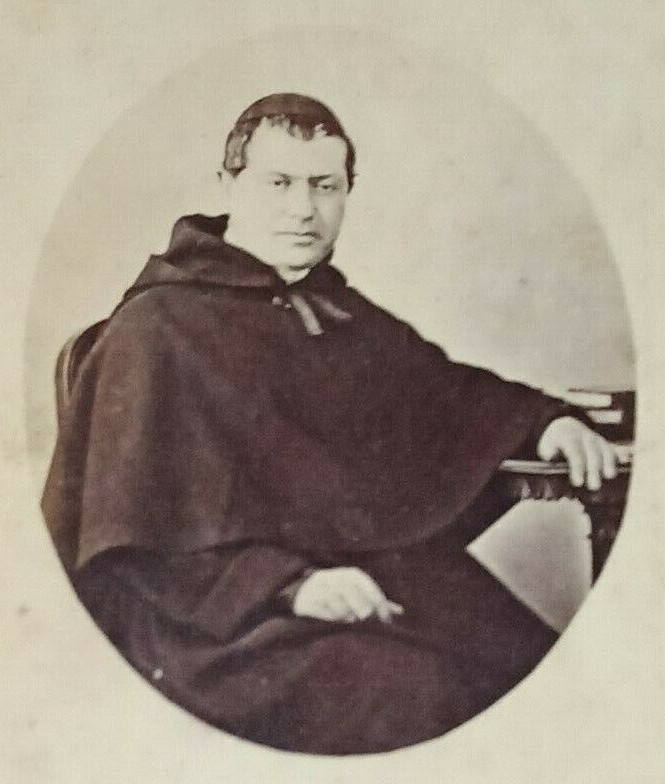
Portrait picture of Paolo Micallef by Leandro Preziosi, ca. 1860-65

== Bibliography ==
- Elvio Ciferri, L'attività pastorale del vescovo Paolo Micaleff a Città di Castello, in «Analecta Augustiniana», 65, Roma, Institutum historicum Ord. S. Augustini, 2002
- Catholic Hierarchy
- Diocese of Gozo
