= Xagħra =

Xagħra Ix-Xagħra Caccia, Sciara
- Local council
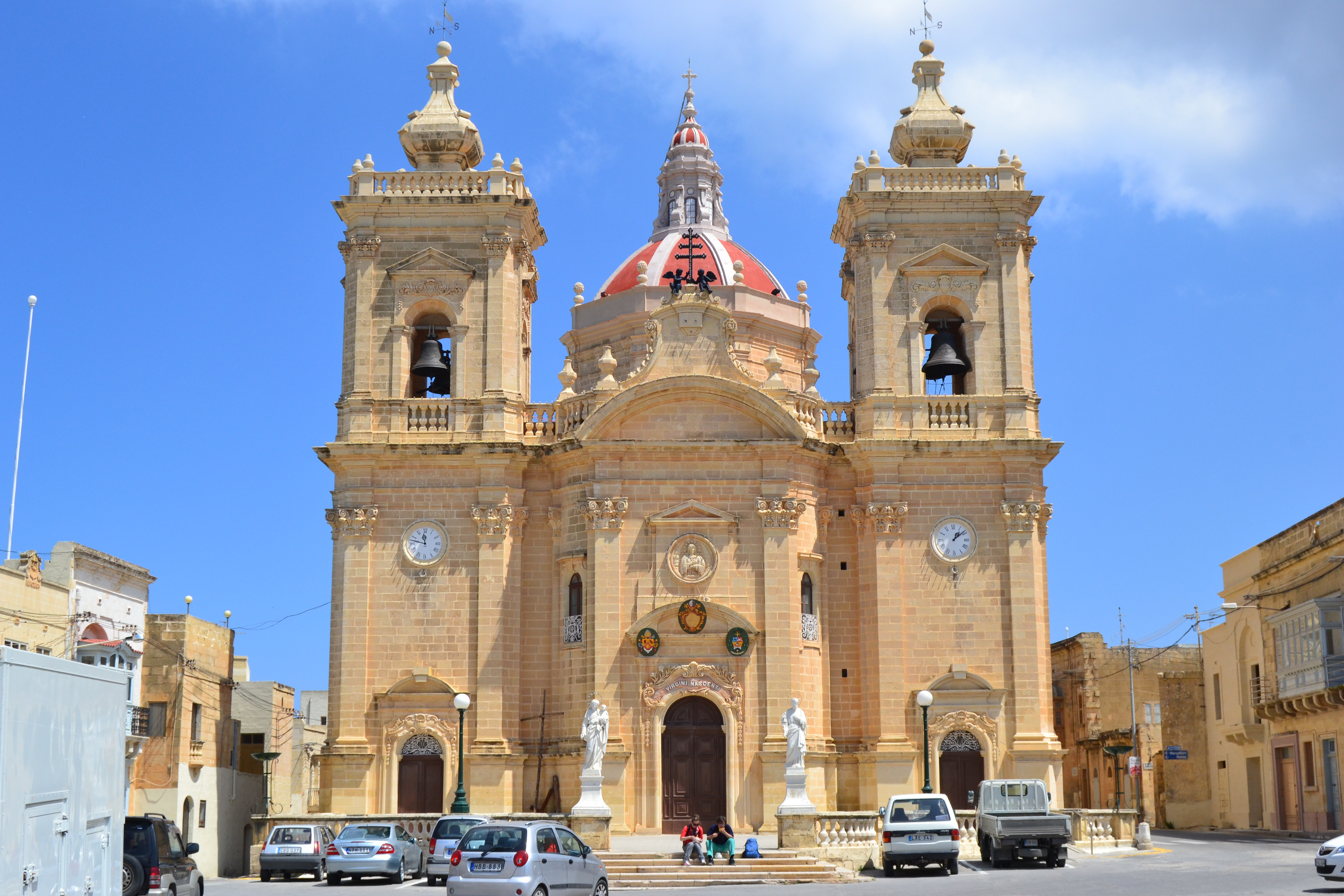
- The Basilica of the Nativity of Our Lady

- Flag Coat of arms

- Xagħra, in Gozo
- Coordinates: 36°3′1″N 14°16′3″E
- Country: Malta
- Region: Gozo Region
- District: Gozo and Comino District
- Borders: Nadur, Victoria, Xewkija, Żebbuġ

Government
  - Mayor: Dr Christian Zammit (PL)

Area
  - Total: 7.6 km^{2} (2.9 sq mi)

Population (July 2024)
  - Total: 5,350
  - Density: 700/km^{2} (1,800/sq mi)
- Demonym(s): Xagħri (m), Xagħrija (f), Xagħrin (pl/n)
- Time zone: UTC+1 (CET)
  - Summer (DST): UTC+2 (CEST)
- Postal code: XRA
- Dialing code: 356
- ISO 3166 code: MT-61
- Patron saint: Our Lady of Victories
- Day of festa: 8 September
- Website: Official website

Xagħra (Maltese: Ix-Xagħra) is an administrative unit of Malta on the island of Gozo. It is one of the earliest inhabited parts of Gozo, being home to the Ġgantija megalithic temples, which date back to 3600 BC, and the Xagħra Stone Circle. Natural underground features such as Xerri's Grotto and Ninu's Cave are located in this town, along with Calypso's Cave, which overlooks the red sandy beach of Ramla Bay. It is the second-largest town in Gozo, and it is located northeast of Victoria, the capital of Gozo. The population of Xagħra was 5,350 in July 2024. This included 2,852 males and 2,498 females; 4,298 Maltese nationals and 1,052 foreign nationals.

Xagħra is a popular tourist destination due to its historical heritage and lively Victory Square. Thousands of visitors flock to Ramla Bay in summer and to the temples all year round.

During the British period, Xagħra was also known as Casal Caccia.

== Twin towns – sister cities ==
Xagħra is twinned with:

- Offida, Italy

== Notable people born here ==
- Sarah Bonnici - pop singer, dancer
