= Giuseppe Pace =

The Right Reverend Giuseppe Pace
- Bishop of Gozo
- Church: Roman Catholic Church
- Diocese: Diocese of Gozo
- See: Gozo (Malta)
- In office: 1944-1972
- Predecessor: Mikiel Gonzi
- Successor: Nikol Joseph Cauchi
- Previous post: Priest

Orders
- Ordination: 3 August 1913
- Consecration: 17 December 1944 by Mikiel Gonzi

Personal details
- Born: May 30, 1890 Victoria, Gozo
- Died: March 31, 1972 (aged 81) Victoria, Gozo

Giuseppe Pace (translated in English into Joseph Pace) was the 7th Bishop of Gozo after Mikiel Gonzi. He remained in office till his death in 1972.

== History ==
Joseph Pace was born in Victoria, Malta on May 30, 1890, son of Giovanni Battista Pace and Cecilia Pace, niece of archbishop of Malta Pietro Pace. He was baptised at St. George's Basilica in Victoria on 1 June 1890 and was given the names Joseph Anthony and Giovanni.

He studied at the Gozo Seminary, at that time managed by the Italian Jesuits. At 16, he passed to the Royal University of Malta. After studying Philosophy for a year in Malta, he went to Rome to continue and expand his studies, where he graduated in Philosophy and Theology.

He was ordained priest on either December 20 or August 3, 1913. In 1916, he was nominated as a canon of the Gozo Cathedral Chapter. In 1919, he continued his studies in Rome, where he graduated as a doctor in Canonical Law.

In 1924, Mgr. Michael Gonzi was appointed as bishop of Gozo, and Pace was chosen as his secretary. Amongst other posts, he served as rector of the Gozo Seminary and lecturer of Dogmatic Theology, Sacred Scriptures and History of the Church within the same seminary. He was also appointed as Archdeacon of Gozo, Domestic Prelate, and General Vicar of Gozo.

== Episcopate ==
On either November 1 or November 11, 1944, the Pope appointed him as Bishop of Gozo. His consecration in the Gozo Cathedral was held on December 17, 1944, by then Archbishop of Malta and his predecessor Mikiel Gonzi. He was installed as Bishop on April 8, 1945.

He died while still in office on 31 March 1972 in Rabat. He had been a priest for over 58 years, and a bishop for over 27 years.

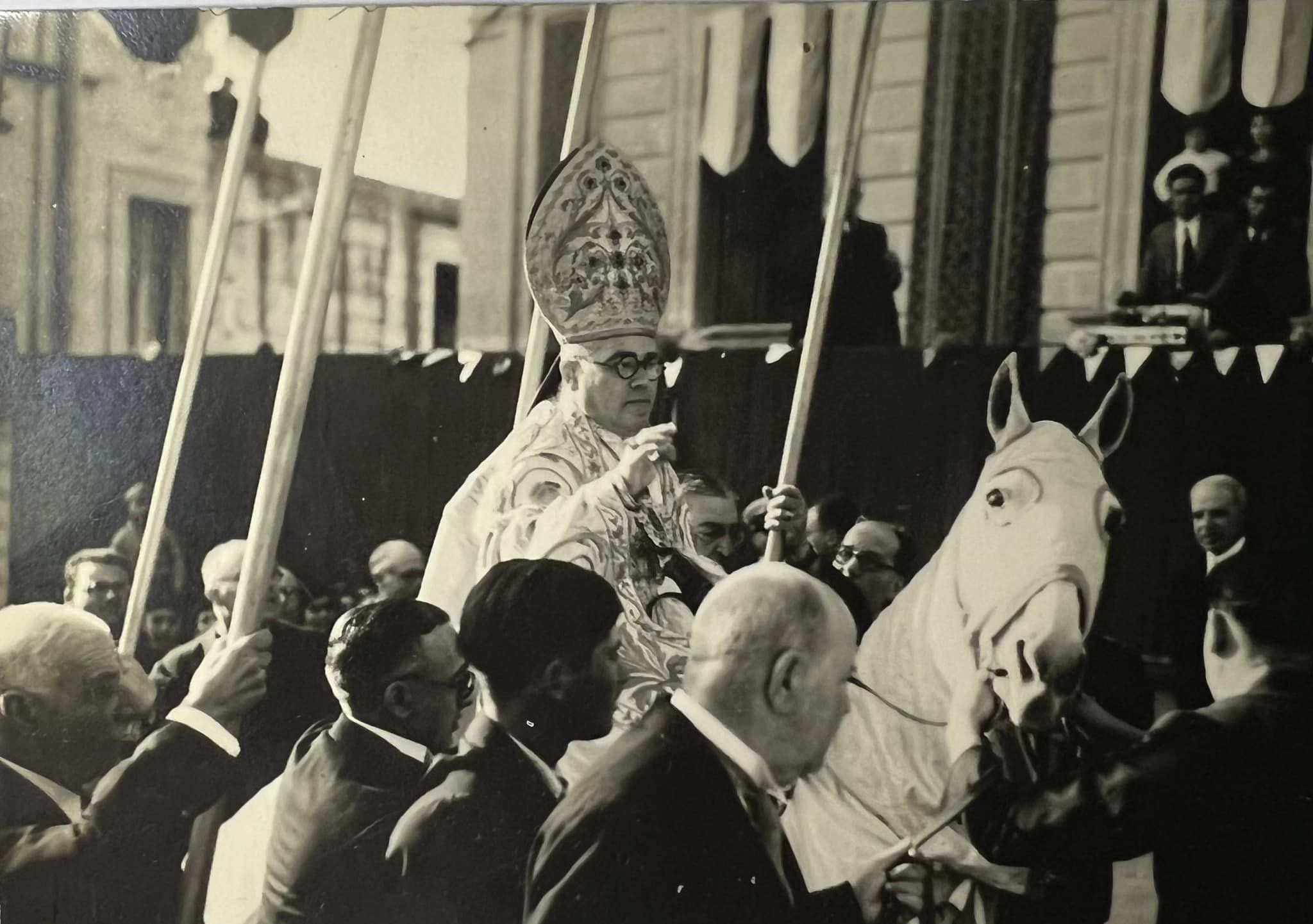
Giuseppe Pace being installed as bishop of Gozo on 8 April 1945
