= Nikol Ġużeppi Cauchi =

The Right Reverend Nikol Ġużeppi Cauchi
- Bishop of Gozo
- Church: Roman Catholic
- Diocese: Gozo
- Appointed: 20 July 1972
- In office: 1972-2005
- Predecessor: Giuseppe Pace
- Successor: Mario Grech
- Previous post: Apostolic Administrator of Gozo (1967-1972)

Orders
- Ordination: 29 March 1952 by Giuseppe Pace
- Consecration: 9 April 1967 by Martin John O'Connor

Personal details
- Born: March 2, 1929 Għarb, Gozo, Malta
- Died: November 15, 2010 (aged 81) Msida, Malta
- Buried: Gozo Cathedral
- Parents: Joseph Cauchi and Josephine Portelli

Nikol Ġużeppi Cauchi (2 March 1929 Gharb, Malta – 15 November 2010 Malta) was the Roman Catholic Bishop of Gozo, Malta.

Ordained in 1952, he was named auxiliary bishop of the Gozo Diocese in 1967 and was appointed diocesan bishop in 1972 retiring in 2005. He died in 2010, aged 81.
