= Diocese of Gozo =

Diocese of the Catholic Church

Coordinates: 36°02′47″N 14°14′23″E

Diocese of Gozo Dioecesis Gaudisiensis Djoċesi ta' Għawdex

Catholic
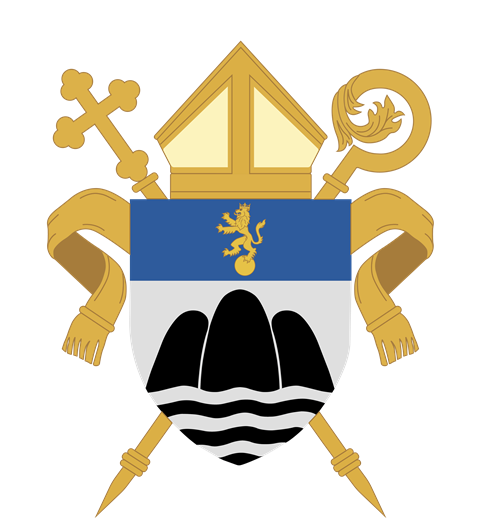

Location
- Country: Malta; Gozo
- Territory: Gozo and Comino
- Ecclesiastical province: Malta
- Metropolitan: Archdiocese of Malta

Statistics
- Area: 67 km^{2} (26 sq mi)
- Population: Total; Catholics: (as of 2023); 37,392; 34,656 (92.7%)
- Parishes: 15
- Churches: 48

Information
- Denomination: Catholic
- Sui iuris church: Latin Church
- Rite: Roman Rite
- Established: 22 September 1864
- Cathedral: Cathedral of the Assumption
- Patron saint: Saint George; Saint Ursula

Current leadership
- Pope: Leo XIV
- Bishop: Anton Teuma
- Metropolitan Archbishop: Charles Scicluna
- Vicar General: Mgr. Giovanni Curmi
- Judicial Vicar: Mgr. Joe Zammit
- Bishops emeritus: Mario Cardinal Grech

Map
- The Diocese of Gozo marked in red.

Website
- churchingozo.mt

The Diocese of Gozo (Latin: Dioecesis Goulos-Gaudisiensis; Maltese: Djoċesi ta' Għawdex) is a Latin diocese of the Catholic Church in Malta, and the only suffragan in the ecclesiastical province of the Metropolitan Archdiocese of Malta, together covering the insular state.

The diocese comprises the island of Gozo (seventeen miles west of the Maltese capital Valletta) and the islet of Comino.

== History ==
Information regarding the origins of the first formal Christian communities in Gozo is lost to time. The oldest of the active parish churches in Gozo are those of Victoria: the Cathedral of the Assumption and the Basilica of St George. Which of these two is the oldest is not quite clear and often disputed. However both probably originated during the Byzantine occupation of Gozo.

Up till the year 1864, Gozo formed part of the then Roman Catholic Diocese of Malta, but Pope Pius IX, acceding to requests by the clergy and the people, erected it into a separate, then exempt diocese, i.e. immediately subject to the Holy See. On 16 March 1863, Michael Franciscus Buttigieg, a native of Gozo, was appointed titular Bishop of Lita and deputy auxiliary of the Archbishop-Bishop of Malta, for the Island of Gozo. He was consecrated at Rome on 3 May of the same year, on 22 September 1864, was created first bishop of the new Diocese of Gozo, and on the 23rd day of the following month made his entry into the new cathedral. Through the efforts of Pietro Pace, vicar-general of the diocese, a diocesan seminary was established on the site formerly occupied by the San Giuliano Hospital, the revenues of which were appropriated to the new institution. This seminary was inaugurated 3 November 1866, and by the express desire of Pius IX placed under the direction of the Jesuits.

On the death of Buttigieg, Paolo Micallef, Superior General of the Augustinian Order, was made Bishop of Città di Castello and appointed administrator of the Diocese of Gozo. He left Gozo in May, 1867, and in 1871 became Archbishop of Pisa. His successor to the administration of the diocese was Antonius Grech Delicata Testaferrata, titular Bishop of Chalcedon, a native of Malta, who in 1868 was appointed Bishop of Gozo, and as such assisted at the First Vatican Council. Grech Delicata's divested himself of his own patrimony in favour of the poor; he died on the last day of 1876.

On 12 March 1877, Pietro Pace, native of Gozo, was appointed to succeed Grech Delicata, and was consecrated in Rome by Cardinal Edward Henry Howard. Under his administration the seminary was augmented by the installation of a meteorological observatory, which was inaugurated by Padre Denza, director of the Vatican Observatory. During this administration an episcopal educational institute for girls was also established, under the care of the Sisters of St. Vincent de Paul, to whom was also entrusted the direction of the annexed orphan asylum. The same bishop provided the diocese with a new episcopal palace and new monasteries, besides laying out large sums of money on the cathedral.

In 1889 Pace was promoted Archbishop of Rhodes and Bishop of Malta. His successor in the See of Gozo was G. M. Camilleri, a native of Valletta (b. 15 March 1842). Under Camilleri's administration the first diocesan synod was celebrated, in October, 1903. This synod was necessary as the diocese was still governed under the outdated rules of the Synod of Malta of 1703. Constitutions and decrees were also promulgated and published.

In May 1990, it was visited by Pope John Paul II.

== Bishops of Gozo ==
	Name	from	to	Notes
1	Michael Franciscus Buttigieg (1864-1866)	1864	1866	
	Paolo Micallef, Administrator of Gozo	1866	1867	Administrator of Gozo
2	Antonius Grech Delicata Testaferrata	1868	1876	
3	Pietro Pace	1877	1889	Became Bishop of Malta
4	Giovanni Maria Camilleri	1889	1924	
5	Mikiel Gonzi (1924-1943)	1924	1943	Became Coadjutor Bishop of Malta, Bishop of Malta, and subsequently Metropolitan Archbishop of Malta
6	Giuseppe Pace	1944	1972	
	Nikol Joseph Cauchi, Administrator of Gozo	1967	1972	Administrator of Gozo
7	Nikol Joseph Cauchi	1972	2006	
8	Mario Grech	2006	2019	Became Pro-secretary of the Synod of Bishops
	Mario Grech	2019	2020	Administrator of Gozo
9	Anton Teuma	2020	-	

== Special churches ==
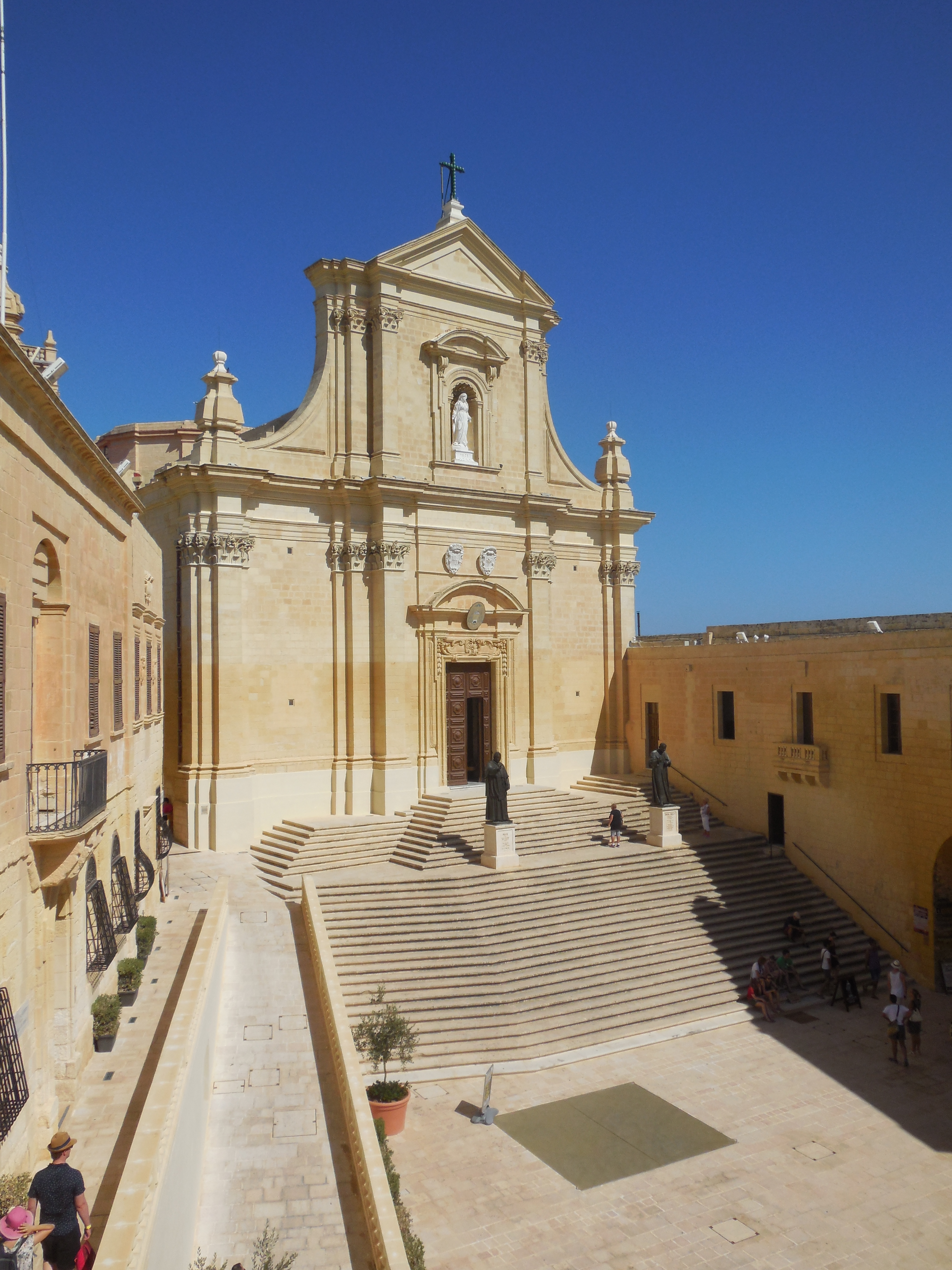
Cathedral of the Assumption

- Cathedral of the Assumption of Mary in Victoria - The cathedral church of Gozo was built in 1697–1703, by Lorenzo Gafa. Its ground plan is in the form of a Latin cross. The cathedral is also the annual pilgrimage site of the Grand Priory of the Mediterranean of the Hospitaller Order of Saint Lazarus of Jerusalem. Its interior is adorned with fine paintings. The "Messagiere di Maria", an Italian periodical, is recognized in the Diocese of Gozo as the official organ of the sanctuary of the Blessed Virgin of Ta' Pinu.
- Basilica and Collegiate Parish of St George in Victoria
- Rotunda of Xewkija in Xewkija
- Basilica and National Shrine of the Blessed Virgin of Ta' Pinu in Għarb
- Basilica and Collegiate Parish of the Visitation in Għarb
- Basilica and Collegiate Parish of St Peter and St Paul in Nadur
- Basilica and Collegiate Parish of the Nativity of Mary in Xagħra

== Important dates ==
- 23 April: Memorial of St George - Patron Saint of the Diocese
- 22 June: Feast of the Blessed Virgin of Ta' Pinu
- 15 August: Solemnity of the Assumption of Mary - Patroness of the Maltese Archipelago and of the Gozo Diocese
- 16 September: Anniversary of the establishment of the Diocese
- 11 October: Dedication of the Diocesan Cathedral
- 21 October: Memorial of Saint Ursula - Patron Saint of the Diocese

== Parishes ==
Parish	Location	Date established
Saint George's	Victoria	pre-1250
Parish of the Cathedral of the Assumption, Gozo	Victoria	pre-1241
Sacred Heart of Jesus	Fontana	27 March 1911
Our Lady of Loreto	Għajnsielem	26 January 1855
Parish of the Visitation of Our Lady	Għarb	29 August 1679
Corpus Christi Parish	Għasri	16 December 1921
Our Lady of Perpetual Succour and St Gregory the Great	Kerċem	10 March 1885
Parish of Saint Paul's Shipwreck	Munxar	12 December 1957
Parish of Saint Peter and Saint Paul	Nadur	28 April 1688
Parish of the Immaculate Conception and Saint Joseph	Qala	3 February 1872
Saint Laurence's	San Lawrenz	15 March 1893
Saint Margaret's	Sannat	28 April 1688
Parish of the Nativity of Our Lady	Xagħra	28 April 1688
Parish of Saint John the Baptist	Xewkija	27 November 1678
Parish of the Assumption of Mary	Żebbuġ, Gozo	28 April 1688

== Sources and external links ==
- Gozo Diocese own site
- GigaCatholic with incumbent biography links

== See also ==
- Culture of Malta
- History of Malta
- List of Churches in Malta
- List of monasteries and convents in Malta
- Religion in Malta
