= List of monuments in Victoria, Gozo =

This is a list of monuments in Victoria, Gozo, Malta, which are listed on the National Inventory of the Cultural Property of the Maltese Islands.

== List ==
Name of object	Location	Coordinates	ID	Photo	Upload
Citadel	It-Telgħa tal-Belt	36°02′48″N 14°14′22″E	00003	Citadel	Upload Photo
Chapel of Sta. Martha	Triq L-Arċisqof Pietru Pace	36°02′32″N 14°14′50″E	00857	Chapel of Sta. Martha	Upload Photo
Church of St. Francis	Pjazza San Franġisk	36°02′32″N 14°14′28″E	00858	Church of St. Francis	Upload Photo
Niche of the Immaculate Conception	Pjazza San Franġisk (S wall of the church)	36°02′32″N 14°14′29″E	00859		Upload Photo
Niche of St Joseph	24-26 Triq Għajn Qatet	36°02′31″N 14°14′29″E	00860		Upload Photo
Niche of St Joseph	62-64 Triq Għajn Qatet	36°02′28″N 14°14′34″E	00861		Upload Photo
Niche of the Immaculate Conception	62-63 Triq San Duminku	36°02′27″N 14°14′32″E	00862		Upload Photo
Niche of the Immaculate Conception	Triq Ġużeppi Spiteri (side wall of the windmill)	36°02′27″N 14°14′36″E	00863		Upload Photo
Niche of St Joseph	126-128 Triq Għajn Qatet	36°02′14″N 14°14′41″E	00864		Upload Photo
Niche Madonna of Loreto	Triq Għajn Qatet (opposite Triq iċ-Ċangar)	36°02′13″N 14°14′42″E	00865		Upload Photo
Statue of St George	51 Triq Enrico Mizzi	36°02′26″N 14°14′26″E	00866	Statue of St George	Upload Photo
Church Madonna of Pompei	Triq Enrico Mizzi (opposite Triq Pompei)	36°02′27″N 14°14′25″E	00867	Church Madonna of Pompei	Upload Photo
Church Immaculate Conception	Triq Enrico Mizzi	36°02′28″N 14°14′24″E	00868	Church Immaculate Conception	Upload Photo
Cross	Pjazza San Franġisk c/w Triq Palma	36°02′33″N 14°14′25″E	00869	Cross	Upload Photo
Niche of the Immaculate Conception	Pjazza San Franġisk c/w Triq Palma	36°02′34″N 14°14′25″E	00870		Upload Photo
Niche of Joannes Duns Scotus	54 Triq Palma	36°02′34″N 14°14′25″E	00871	Niche of Joannes Duns Scotus	Upload Photo
Niche of the Madonna of Sorrows	31 Triq id-Dejqa	36°02′35″N 14°14′22″E	00872		Upload Photo
Niche of the Madonna of Charity	Triq il-Karita' c/w Triq id-Dejqa	36°02′35″N 14°14′21″E	00873	Niche of the Madonna of Charity	Upload Photo
Niche of the Madonna of ta' Pinu	82 Triq Vajrinġa	36°02′33″N 14°14′22″E	00874	Niche of the Madonna of ta' Pinu	Upload Photo
Niche of St Joseph	104 Triq Vajrinġa	36°02′32″N 14°14′18″E	00875	Niche of St Joseph	Upload Photo
Niche of the Immaculate Conception	Pjazzetta Fuq it-Tomba c/w Triq tal-Għajn	36°02′32″N 14°14′17″E	00876	Niche of the Immaculate Conception	Upload Photo
Church of St. Augustine	Pjazza Santu Wistin	36°02′33″N 14°14′13″E	00877	Church of St. Augustine	Upload Photo
Niche of the Immaculate Conception	15 Pjazzetta Fuq it-Tomba	36°02′34″N 14°14′15″E	00878	Niche of the Immaculate Conception	Upload Photo
Niche of Mary Queen of Heavens	7 Pjazzetta Fuq it-Tomba	36°02′35″N 14°14′15″E	00879	Niche of Mary Queen of Heavens	Upload Photo
Statue St. Joseph with relief of Madonna of Sorrows	Triq Papa Ġwanni Pawlu II	36°02′46″N 14°13′58″E	00880	Statue St. Joseph with relief of Madonna of Sorrows	Upload Photo
Niche of the Assumption	"Ta' Marija", 126 Triq Sant' Orsla	36°02′44″N 14°14′09″E	00881		Upload Photo
Niche of the Madonna of Good Counsel	35 Triq Sant' Orsla	36°02′44″N 14°14′15″E	00882		Upload Photo
Niche of St. Anne	Triq Bieb L-Imdina (Main Gate), Cittadella	36°02′45″N 14°14′21″E	00883	Niche of St. Anne	Upload Photo
Niche of the Madonna of Soledad	Pjazza Katidral (on the left going to Archaeology Museum), Cittadella	36°02′46″N 14°14′22″E	00884	Niche of the Madonna of Soledad	Upload Photo
Missing Niche of Madonna of Sorrows	Pjazza Katidral (on the right going to Archaeology Museum), Cittadella	36°02′46″N 14°14′22″E	00885	Missing Niche of Madonna of Sorrows	Upload Photo
Relief of Madonna and Child	1 Triq il-Fosos, Cittadella	36°02′46″N 14°14′22″E	00886	Relief of Madonna and Child	Upload Photo
Chapel of St. Joseph	Triq San Ġużepp c/w Triq Bernardo DeOpuo, Cittadella	36°02′49″N 14°14′23″E	00887	Chapel of St. Joseph	Upload Photo
Chapel of Santa Barbara	Triq Bieb L-Imdina, Cittadella	36°02′46″N 14°14′23″E	00888	Chapel of Santa Barbara	Upload Photo
Cathedral of St. Mary	Pjazza Katidral, Cittadella	36°02′47″N 14°14′23″E	00889	Cathedral of St. Mary	Upload Photo
Niche of the Madonna of Mount Carmel	Triq Mons. Luiġi Vella c/w Triq id-Dawwara	36°02′41″N 14°14′12″E	00890	Niche of the Madonna of Mount Carmel	Upload Photo
Niche of the Sacred Heart of Jesus	12 Triq Mons. Luiġi Vella	36°02′42″N 14°14′14″E	00891		Upload Photo
Empty Niche	Pjazza Savina	36°02′43″N 14°14′16″E	00892		Upload Photo
Niche of the Immaculate Conception	Pjazza Savina c/w Triq Sant'Orsla	36°02′43″N 14°14′17″E	00893	Niche of the Immaculate Conception	Upload Photo
Church of the Nativity of the Madonna	Pjazza Savina	36°02′42″N 14°14′17″E	00894	Church of the Nativity of the Madonna	Upload Photo
Chapel of St. James	Pjazza L-Indipendenza	36°02′41″N 14°14′23″E	00895	Chapel of St. James	Upload Photo
Niche of the Madonna of Lourdes	Pjazza L-Indipendenza	36°02′41″N 14°14′20″E	00896	Niche of the Madonna of Lourdes	Upload Photo
Niche Madonna of Loreto	Pjazza San Ġorġ c/w Triq is-Suq	36°02′40″N 14°14′22″E	00897	Niche Madonna of Loreto	Upload Photo
Parish Church of St. George	Pjazza San Ġorġ	36°02′38″N 14°14′21″E	00898	Parish Church of St. George	Upload Photo
Niche of St. Aloysius Gonzaga	Triq il-Karita' c/w Triq Mons. Ġużeppi Farrugia	36°02′38″N 14°14′21″E	00899	Niche of St. Aloysius Gonzaga	Upload Photo
Niche of the Blessed Mary of Mercy	Triq Mons. Ġużeppi Farrugia c/w Triq Sant' Indrija	36°02′37″N 14°14′22″E	00900	Niche of the Blessed Mary of Mercy	Upload Photo
Niche of St. Andrew	Triq Sant' Indrija	36°02′36″N 14°14′24″E	00901	Niche of St. Andrew	Upload Photo
Niche of the Madonna of Mount Carmel	8 Triq il-Palma	36°02′40″N 14°14′27″E	00902	Niche of the Madonna of Mount Carmel	Upload Photo
Niche of St. Francis	Triq ir-Repubblika c/w Triq Taħt Putirjal	36°02′41″N 14°14′29″E	00903	Niche of St. Francis	Upload Photo
Niche of St. Francis	Triq Taħt Putirjal (opposite the playground)	36°02′37″N 14°14′27″E	00904	Niche of St. Francis	Upload Photo
Statue of St George	Triq San Ġorġ c/w Triq il-Librerija	36°02′35″N 14°14′17″E	00905	Statue of St George	Upload Photo
Niche of the Madonna of Sorrows	64 Triq San Ġorġ	36°02′35″N 14°14′18″E	00906		Upload Photo
Niche of the Madonna of Providence	90 Triq San Ġorġ c/w Triq il-Providenza	36°02′37″N 14°14′19″E	00907	Niche of the Madonna of Providence	Upload Photo
Niche of the Madonna of Mount Carmel	Triq San Ġorġ	36°02′38″N 14°14′20″E	00908		Upload Photo
Niche of the Madonna of Sorrows	Triq il-Karita' c/w Sqaq Nru. 2	36°02′34″N 14°14′20″E	00909	Niche of the Madonna of Sorrows	Upload Photo
Niche of Christ the Saviour	42 Triq Arċipriet Saver Cassar	36°02′38″N 14°14′19″E	00910		Upload Photo
Niche of the Assumption	81 Triq Santa Marija	36°02′41″N 14°14′16″E	00911	Niche of the Assumption	Upload Photo
Niche of the Madonna of Lourdes	69 Triq Santa Marija	36°02′39″N 14°14′17″E	00912		Upload Photo
Niche of the Madonna of Sorrows	40 Triq il-Karmnu	36°02′38″N 14°14′16″E	00913		Upload Photo
Niche of the Crucifix	Triq Santa Marija c/w Triq il-Madonna tal-Karmnu	36°02′39″N 14°14′16″E	00914		Upload Photo
Niche of St Joseph	46 Triq il-Belliegħa	36°02′48″N 14°14′46″E	00915		Upload Photo
Statue of Christ embracing cross and relief of the Madonna of Sorrows	Triq il-Kappuċċini c/w Triq Patri Ġaċintu Camenzuli	36°02′54″N 14°14′45″E	00916	Statue of Christ embracing cross and relief of the Madonna of Sorrows	Upload Photo
Niche of the Immaculate Conception	Triq il-Kappuċċini (by the parvis gate)	36°02′54″N 14°14′44″E	00917		Upload Photo
Statue of St. Paul	Triq il-Kappuċċini c/w Triq is-Sagħtar	36°02′57″N 14°14′46″E	00918		Upload Photo
Church of Our Lady of Divine Grace	Triq il-Kappuċċini	36°02′54″N 14°14′43″E	00919	Church of Our Lady of Divine Grace	Upload Photo
Statue of the Sacred Heart of Mary	Triq il-Kappuċċini c/w Triq Patri Manwel Magri	36°02′51″N 14°14′42″E	00920	Statue of the Sacred Heart of Mary	Upload Photo
Statue of St. Francis	Triq il-Kappuċċini (opposite Triq Patri Manwel Magri)	36°02′51″N 14°14′41″E	00921	Statue of St. Francis	Upload Photo
Niche of the Sacred Heart of Mary	103 Triq Wara s-Sur	36°02′59″N 14°14′15″E	00922		Upload Photo
Niche of the Madonna of Mount Carmel	14 Triq L-Arċisqof Pietru Pace	36°02′32″N 14°14′32″E	00923		Upload Photo
Relief of the Annunciation	21-23 Triq L-Arċisqof Pietru Pace	36°02′32″N 14°14′32″E	00924		Upload Photo
Niche of St Joseph	31 Triq Dun Pawl Micallef c/w Triq Għar Gerduf	36°02′31″N 14°14′06″E	00925		Upload Photo
Niche of the Sacred Heart of Jesus	43 Triq Dun Pawl Micallef	36°02′32″N 14°14′07″E	00926		Upload Photo
Niche of the Annunciation	35 Triq Dun Pawl Micallef	36°02′31″N 14°14′05″E	00927		Upload Photo
Church of Our Lady of Manresa	Triq Santa Dminka	36°02′08″N 14°14′19″E	00928	Church of Our Lady of Manresa	Upload Photo
Church Our Lady of the Annunciation	Triq Petri, Wied il-Lunzjata	36°02′26″N 14°13′59″E	00929	Church Our Lady of the Annunciation	Upload Photo
Statue of St Joseph	Triq Petri, Wied il-Lunzjata	36°02′28″N 14°13′58″E	00930		Upload Photo
Church of Cana Movement	Triq Fortunato Mizzi	36°02′33″N 14°14′57″E	00931	Church of Cana Movement	Upload Photo
Church of the Carmelite Home	Triq Telgħa tal-Belt c/w Triq il-Kastell	36°02′44″N 14°14′20″E	00932	Church of the Carmelite Home	Upload Photo
Church of Don Bosco Oratory	Pjazza Santu Wistin / Pjazetta Fuq it-Tomba	36°02′34″N 14°14′15″E	00933	Church of Don Bosco Oratory	Upload Photo
Church of the Good Shepherd	Triq 31 ta'Marzu 1979 c/w Triq Sir Pawlu Boffa	36°02′16″N 14°14′35″E	00934	Church of the Good Shepherd	Upload Photo
Church of Our Lady of the Sacred Heart	25 Triq Palma	36°02′38″N 14°14′25″E	00935	Church of Our Lady of the Sacred Heart	Upload Photo
Cross	Pjazza Santu Wistin c/w Pjazetta Fuq it-Tomba	36°02′33″N 14°14′15″E	00936	Cross	Upload Photo
Cross	Triq ir-Repubblica c/w Triq il-Kappuċċini	36°02′41″N 14°14′29″E	00937	Cross	Upload Photo
Niche of the Madonna of Graces	Triq Santa Dminka	36°02′04″N 14°14′17″E	00938		Upload Photo
Bishop's Palace	Pjazza tal-Katidral, Cittadella	36°02′46″N 14°14′22″E	01237	Bishop's Palace	Upload Photo
Cagliares Palace	Triq San Ġużepp, Cittadella	36°02′48″N 14°14′22″E	01238	Cagliares Palace	Upload Photo
Law Courts	Pjazza tal-Katidral, Cittadella	36°02′46″N 14°14′21″E	01239	Law Courts	Upload Photo
Natural Science Museum	Triq il-Kwartieri ta' San Martin, Cittadella	36°02′48″N 14°14′21″E	01240	Natural Science Museum	Upload Photo
Magazines (Craft Shop)	Triq Bieb L-Imdina, Cittadella	36°02′46″N 14°14′23″E	01241	Magazines (Craft Shop)	Upload Photo
Cathedral Museum	Triq il-Fosos, Cittadella	36°02′48″N 14°14′24″E	01242	Cathedral Museum	Upload Photo
The Old Gatehouse	Triq Petri, Wied il-Lunzjata	36°02′28″N 14°13′59″E	01243	The Old Gatehouse	Upload Photo
Archaeology Museum	Triq Bieb L-Imdina, Cittadella	36°02′45″N 14°14′22″E	01244	Archaeology Museum	Upload Photo
St Michael Bastion - Citadel	Cittadella	36°02′44″N 14°14′22″E	01463	St Michael Bastion - Citadel	Upload Photo
St Martin Demi-bastion - Citadel	Cittadella	36°02′47″N 14°14′20″E	01464	St Martin Demi-bastion - Citadel	Upload Photo
St Martin Cavalier - Citadel	Triq il-Kwartieri ta' San Martin, Cittadella	36°02′48″N 14°14′19″E	01465	St Martin Cavalier - Citadel	Upload Photo
St John Demi-Bastion - Citadel	Cittadella	36°02′47″N 14°14′25″E	01466	St John Demi-Bastion - Citadel	Upload Photo
St John Cavalier - Citadel	Triq il-Fosos, Cittadella	36°02′47″N 14°14′24″E	01467	St John Cavalier - Citadel	Upload Photo
Covertway - Citadel	from St. Michael Bastion to Lower Battery	36°02′45″N 14°14′24″E	01468	Covertway - Citadel	Upload Photo
Ravelin - Citadel	It-Telgħa tal-Belt	36°02′45″N 14°14′20″E	01469	Ravelin - Citadel	Upload Photo
Ditch - Citadel	Ditch	36°02′46″N 14°14′26″E	01470	Ditch - Citadel	Upload Photo
Medieval enceinte - Citadel	N part of fortifications	36°02′50″N 14°14′21″E	01471	Medieval enceinte - Citadel	Upload Photo
Medieval sally-port on north enceinte - Citadel	Cittadella	36°02′50″N 14°14′23″E	01472	Medieval sally-port on north enceinte - Citadel	Upload Photo
Masonry revetments along the foot of the cliff face - Citadel	N part of fortifications	36°02′50″N 14°14′23″E	01473	Masonry revetments along the foot of the cliff face - Citadel	Upload Photo
Main gate - Citadel	Cittadella	36°02′45″N 14°14′22″E	01474	Main gate - Citadel	Upload Photo
Curtain wall linking St Martin Demi-bastion to St Michael Bastion - Citadel	Cittadella	36°02′46″N 14°14′21″E	01475	Curtain wall linking St Martin Demi-bastion to St Michael Bastion - Citadel	Upload Photo
Curtain wall linking St John Demi-bastion to St Michael Bastion - Citadel	Cittadella	36°02′46″N 14°14′23″E	01476	Curtain wall linking St John Demi-bastion to St Michael Bastion - Citadel	Upload Photo
Gunpowder Magazine - Citadel	Cittadella	36°02′48″N 14°14′25″E	01477	Gunpowder Magazine - Citadel	Upload Photo
Low Battery - Citadel	Cittadella	36°02′48″N 14°14′26″E	01478	Low Battery - Citadel	Upload Photo
Dar Manresa	Triq Santa Dminka	36°02′08″N 14°14′19″E	02592	Dar Manresa	Upload Photo
