= Victoria, Malta =

Victoria Il-Belt Victoria Città Victoria, Ir-Rabat, Għawdex
- Town and Local council
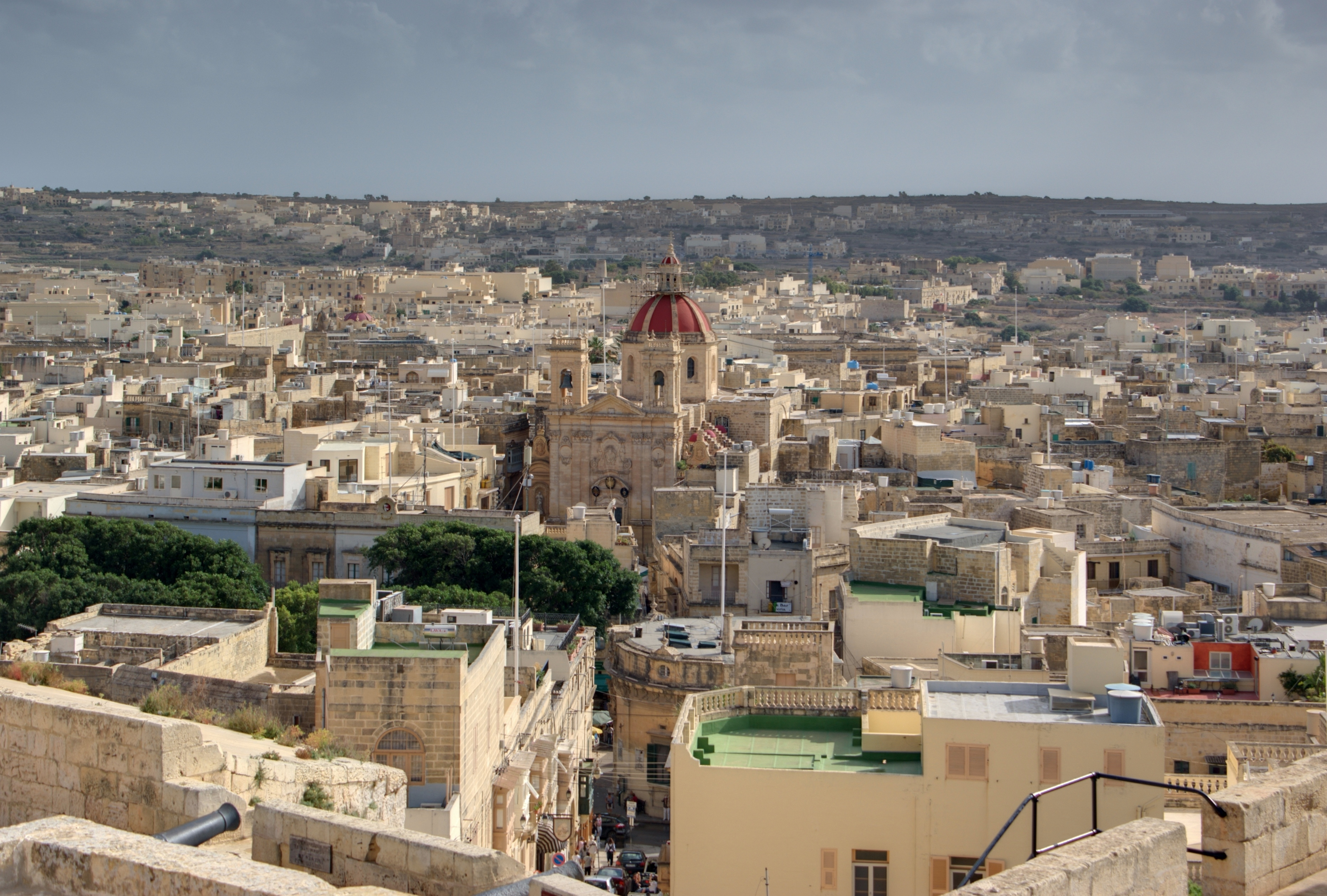
- View of Victoria

- Flag Coat of arms
- Motto: A Magna Maxima (From Great, Supreme)
- Location within Malta Location within Mediterranean
- Coordinates: 36°2′37″N 14°14′35″E
- Country: Malta
- Region: Gozo Region
- District: Gozo and Comino District
- Borders: Fontana, Għasri, Kerċem, Xagħra, Xewkija, Żebbuġ

Government
  - Mayor: Brian Azzopardi (PN)

Area
  - Total: 2.9 km^{2} (1.1 sq mi)

Population (July 2024)
  - Total: 7,491
  - Density: 2,600/km^{2} (6,700/sq mi)
- Demonym(s): Rabti t'Għawdex (m), Rabtija t'Għawdex (f), Rabtin t'Għawdex (pl)
- Time zone: UTC+1 (CET)
  - Summer (DST): UTC+2 (CEST)
- Postal code: VCT
- Dialing code: 356
- ISO 3166 code: MT-45
- Patron saint: St. George; St. Mary
- Day of festa: 3rd Sunday of July (St. George); 15 August (St. Mary)
- Website: Official website

Victoria (Maltese: Il-Belt Victoria, meaning "the city Victoria"), also known among the native Maltese as Rabat (which is the name of the old town centre) or by its title Città Victoria, is an administrative unit of Malta, and the main town on Gozo. Victoria is the most populous settlement in Gozo. Its population was 7,491 in July 2024. This included 3,934 males and 3,557 females; 5,801 Maltese nationals and 1,690 foreign nationals.

The area around the town, situated on a hill near the centre of the island, has been settled since Neolithic times. Victoria is the name given on 10 June 1887 by the British government on the occasion of the Golden Jubilee of Queen Victoria, at the request of Pietro Monsignor Pace, Bishop of Gozo. Many Gozitans, mainly older ones, still often refer to it by the name Rabat. It is usually known as Rabat, Gozo to distinguish it from the town of Rabat on the main island of Malta.

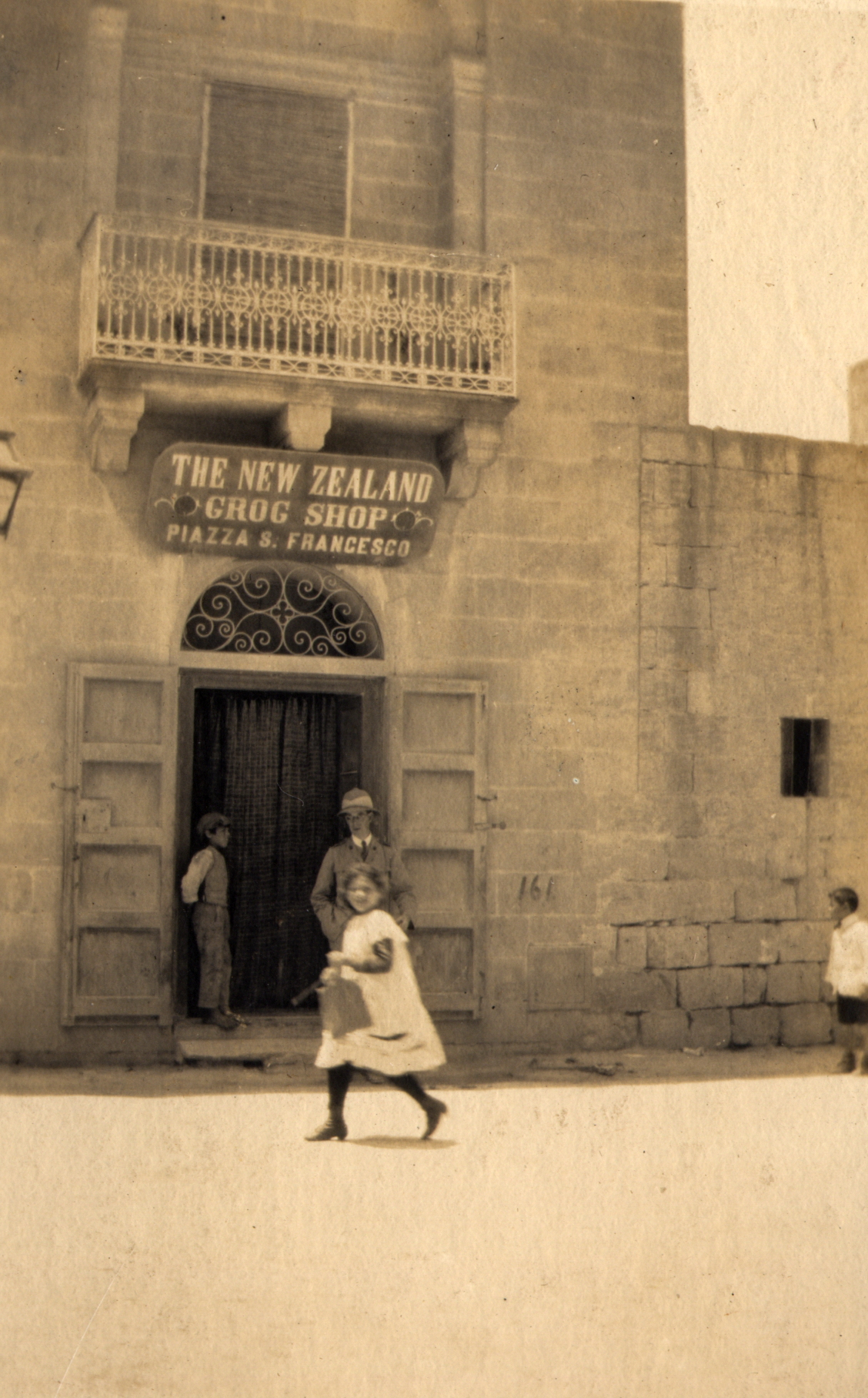
The New Zealand Grog Shop, Piazza San Francesco, Victoria (Rabato), island of Gozo, c.1916. The shop had an extensive clientele among the New Zealand troops stationed on Gozo.

== Architectural heritage ==
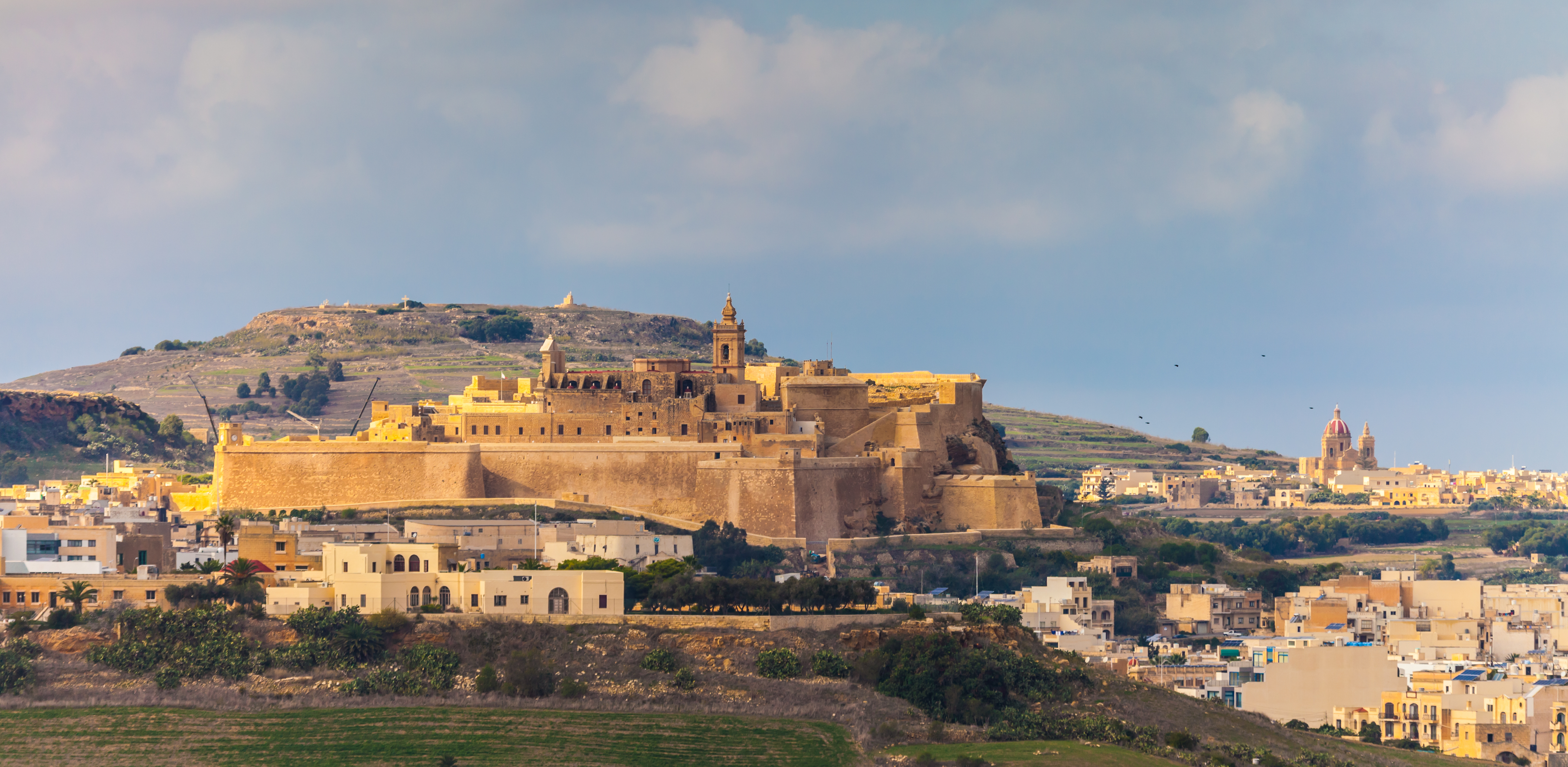
The Cittadella

- The Cittadella, including:
  - Cathedral of the Assumption
  - Gozo Museum of Archaeology
  - Gran Castello Historic House (Folklore Museum)
  - Natural Science Museum
  - Old Prison
- St George's Basilica
- Heart of Gozo: Il-Hagar Museum
- War Memorial (Independence Square)
- Banca Giuratale (Independence Square)
- St Francis' Church (St Francis Square)
- War shelter under the Cittadella (Cittadella)
- War Shelter under Triq id-Dejqa (Narrow Street)
- War Shelter under St Augustine's Square (St Augustine's Convent)

Churches in Victoria

- Cathedral of the Assumption
- St George's Basilica, Victoria
- St Francis Conventual Church (Franciscan Friars)
- St James the Greater Church
- Nativity of Mary Church (Savina)
- St Augustine Church (Augustinian Friars)
- St John Bosco Oratory Church
- St Martha's Church
- Annunciation Church
- Cana Movement Church
- Good Shepherd Church
- Manresa Church (Jesuits)
- Our Lady of Grace Church (Capuchin Friars)
- Our Lady Help of Christians Church (Salesian Nuns)
- Immaculate Heart of Mary Church (Franciscan Nuns)
- Our Lady of Pompei Church (Dominican Nuns)
- St Barbara's Church (Citadel)
- St Joseph's Church (Citadel)
- Immaculate Conception Church (Seminary)
- Nazareth Chapel (Poor Clares)

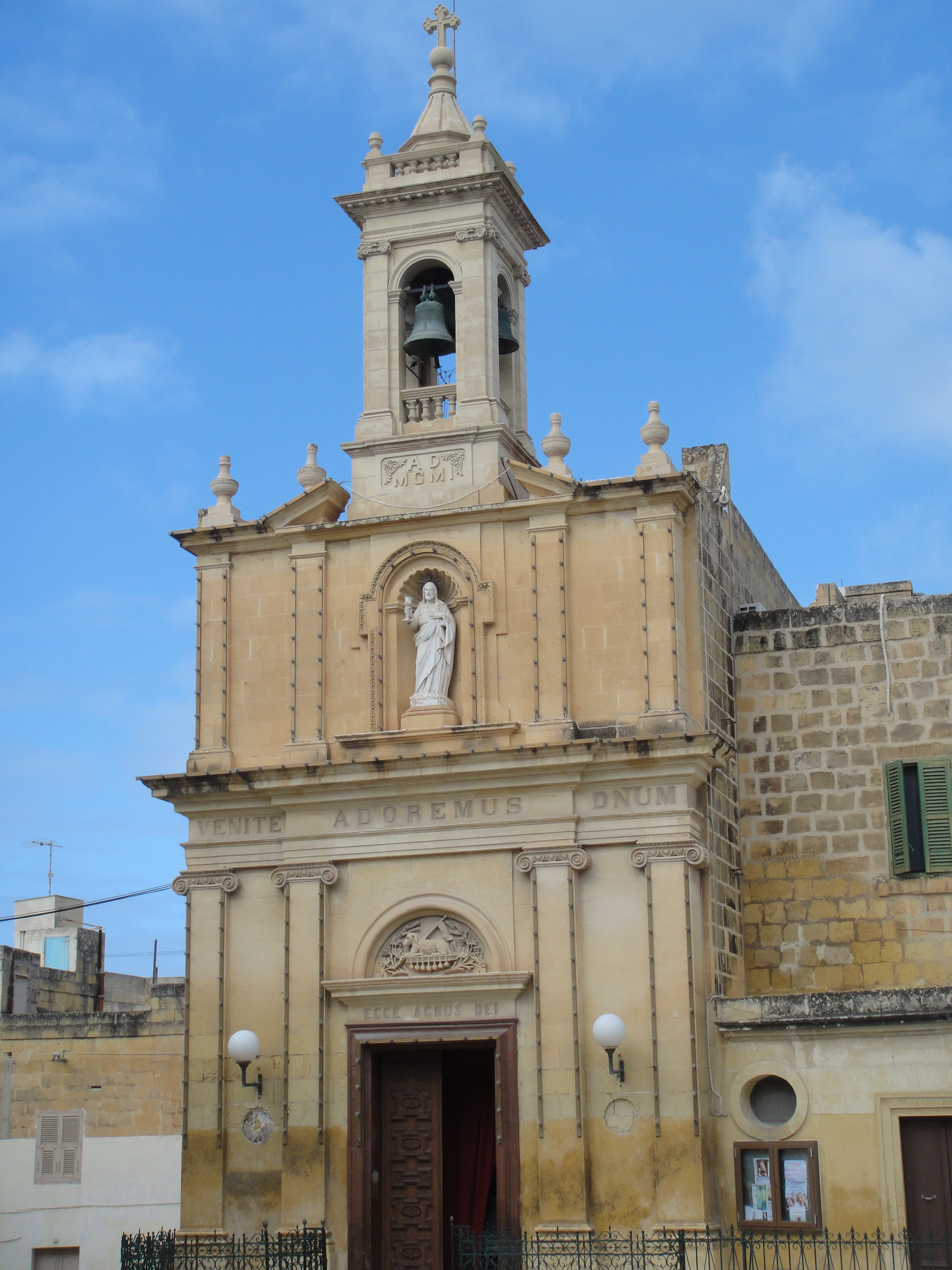
Church of Ta' Savina in Victoria.

=== Cittadella ===
In the heart of Victoria lies the Cittadella (Citadel), formerly known as il Castello, which has been the centre of activity of the island since Neolithic times, but is known to be first fortified during the Bronze Age c. 1500 BC. It was later developed by the Phoenicians and continued into becoming a complex Acropolis by Roman times.

The north side of the Citadel dates back to the Aragonese domination period. The south flank, overlooking Victoria, was re-constructed under the Knights of St. John, namely between 1599 and 1603, after Ottomans invaded the city in 1551. The massive defensive stone walls of the fortifications rise above the town and were built by the Knights to protect the village communities from foraging corsairs attempting to take slaves and threatened invasion of Moslem forces fighting Christendom.

Within its walls lies a fine 17th-century baroque Cathedral designed by Lorenzo Gafà, the Maltese architect who also built the Cathedral of Mdina. It is said that it lies on the site where a Roman temple dedicated to Juno once stood. It is most famous for the trompe-l'œil painting on its ceiling, which depicts the interior of a dome that was never built. The Cathedral is built on one of the oldest religious sites in Gozo, if not the oldest, with evidence of some sort of temple dedicated to a goddess or female figure long before the Romans.

The Cathedral houses a statue of the Assumption of Mary, donated to the Cathedral by the Leone Philharmonic Society (1863). The statue was originally bought by the band from Rome from the Fabbrica di Statue Religiose of Francesco Rosa in 1897, when the band had its first disagreement with its first 'daughter-band' the La Stella Philharmonic Society (1880), and the Leone Band took control of the feast of the Assumption of Mary, and the La Stella Band took control of the feast of St. George. The statue was then donated to the Cathedral on April 29, 1956 after many other disagreements between the bands.

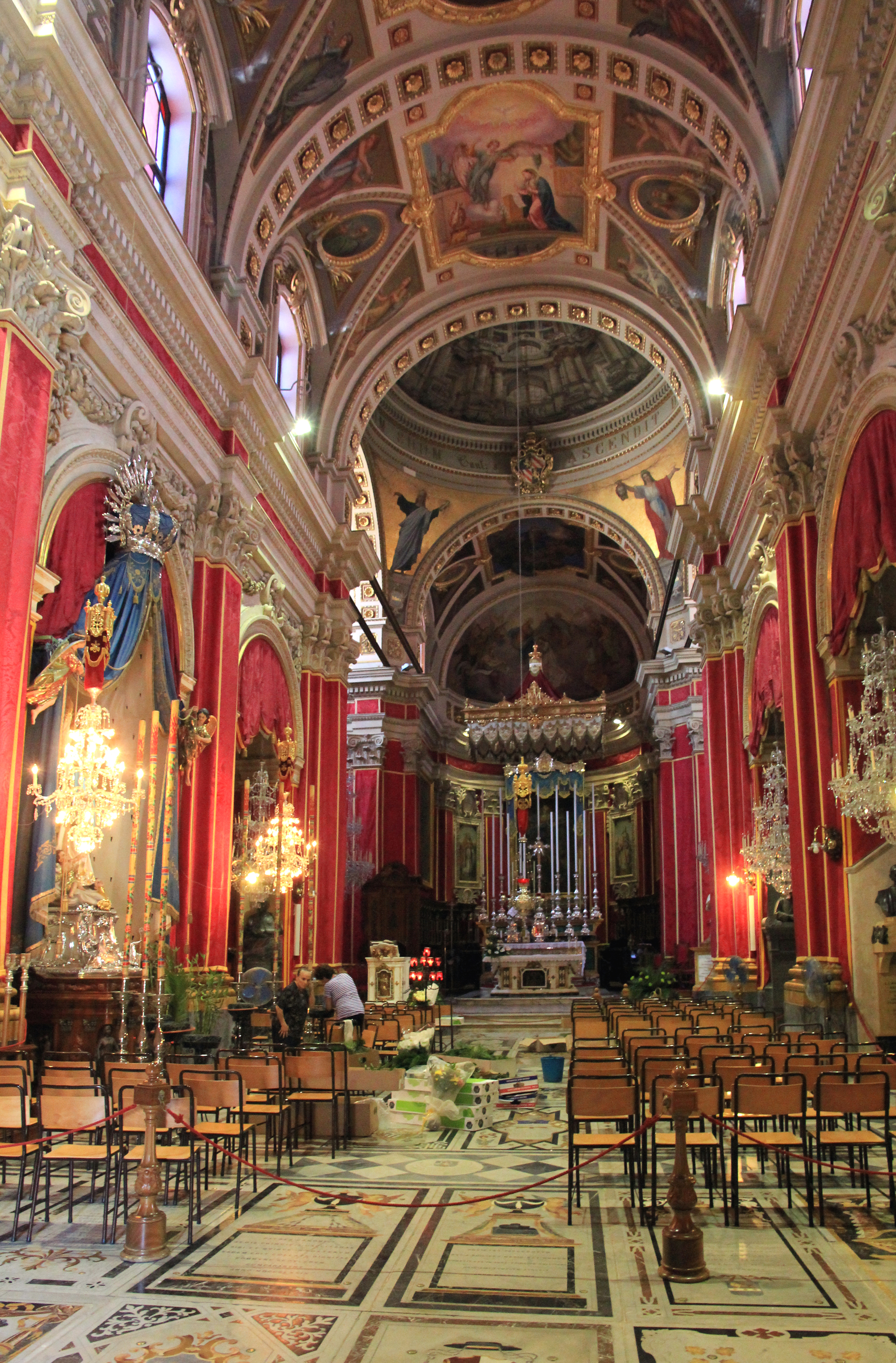
The interior of the Cathedral of Assumption inside the citadel in Victoria.

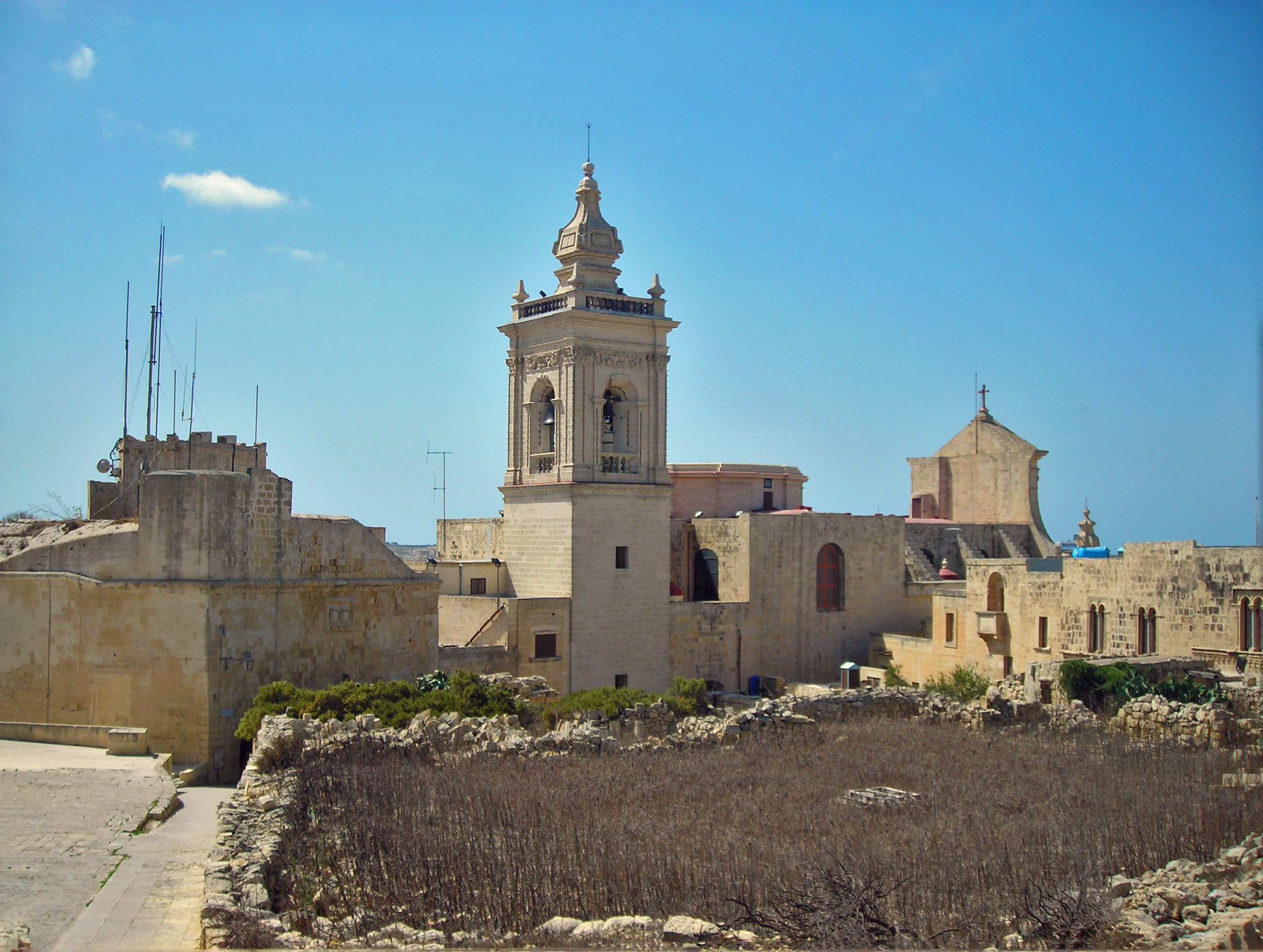
The exterior of the Cathedral of Assumption.

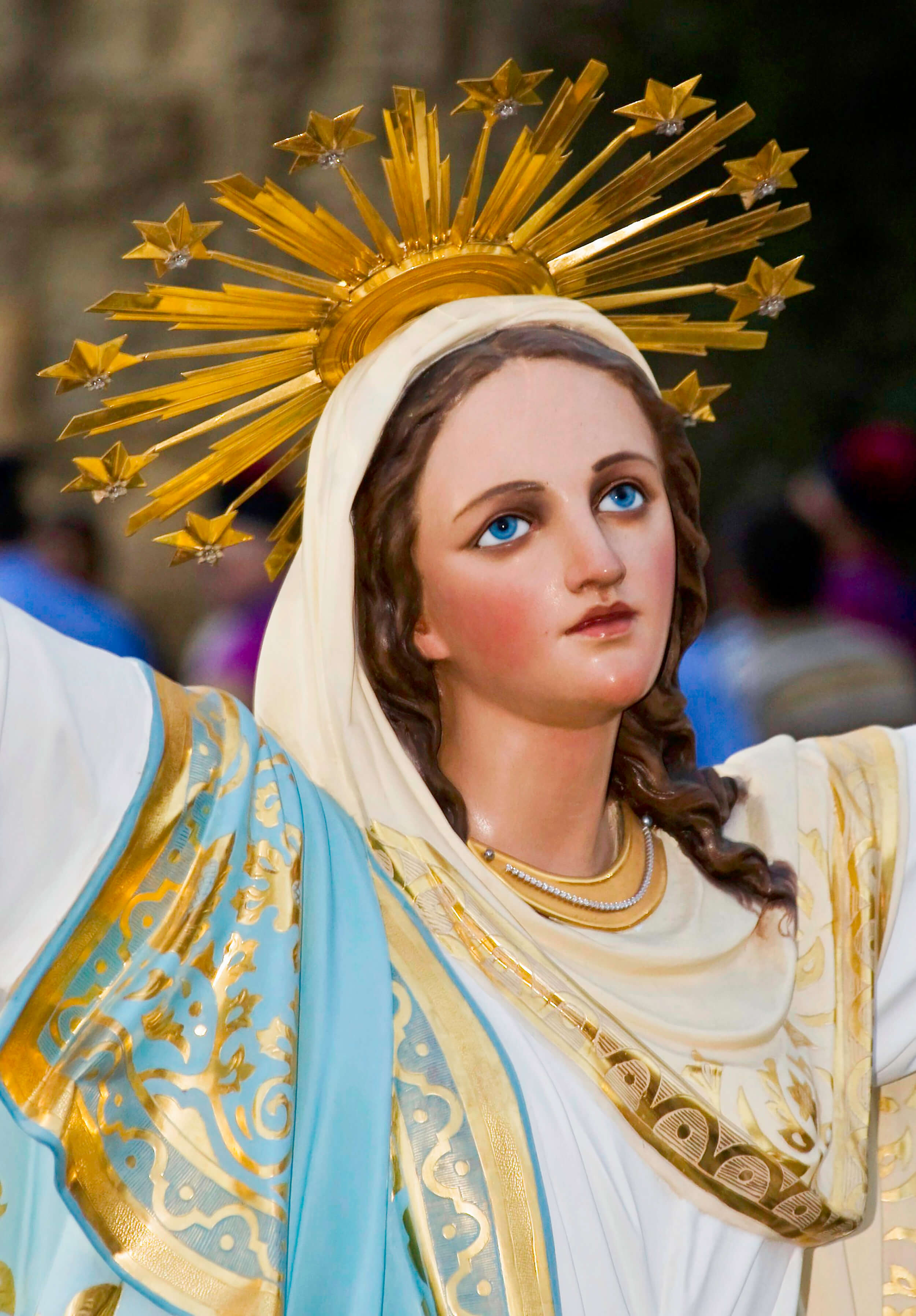
The statue of the Assumption of Mary (1897).

=== St George's Parish ===
St George's Basilica, Victoria, caters for half of the population of Victoria, as it is a personal parish (as opposed to other parishes who are territorial) operating in the city of Victoria. Its parish church, dedicated to St George, has the status of a Basilica. This church was built in the 1670s and suffered severe damage in the earthquake of 1693. A new façade was built in 1818. The dome and the aisles are of recent construction (1930s and 1940s). There are several works of art in this church which include the painting of the dome and ceiling by Gian Battista Conti of Rome and other paintings and sculptures by Mattia Preti, Giuseppe d'Arena, Stefano Erardi, Alessio Erardi, Francesco V. Zahra, Giuseppe Calì, and contemporary Alfred Camilleri Cauchi and John L. Grima. The titular statue of St George was carved from solid wood by Pietro Paolo Azzopardi in 1838 and is the first titular statue on the island. The area over which the church is built is of considerable archaeological interest.

The parish celebrates two feasts during the year: 23 April, the official date celebrating the death of the martyr, and the third Sunday of July, when the solemn festivities in honour of Gozo's patron saint are held.

In February 2013, the Basilica opened the doors to its new modern museum, one of a kind in the country. It is the first building built for the purpose of a museum. The Museum and cultural centre, named as Heart of Gozo: Il-Hagar, displays a rich collection of historical and artistic artefacts previously inaccessible to the general public. The museum is found on the left side of the Basilica.

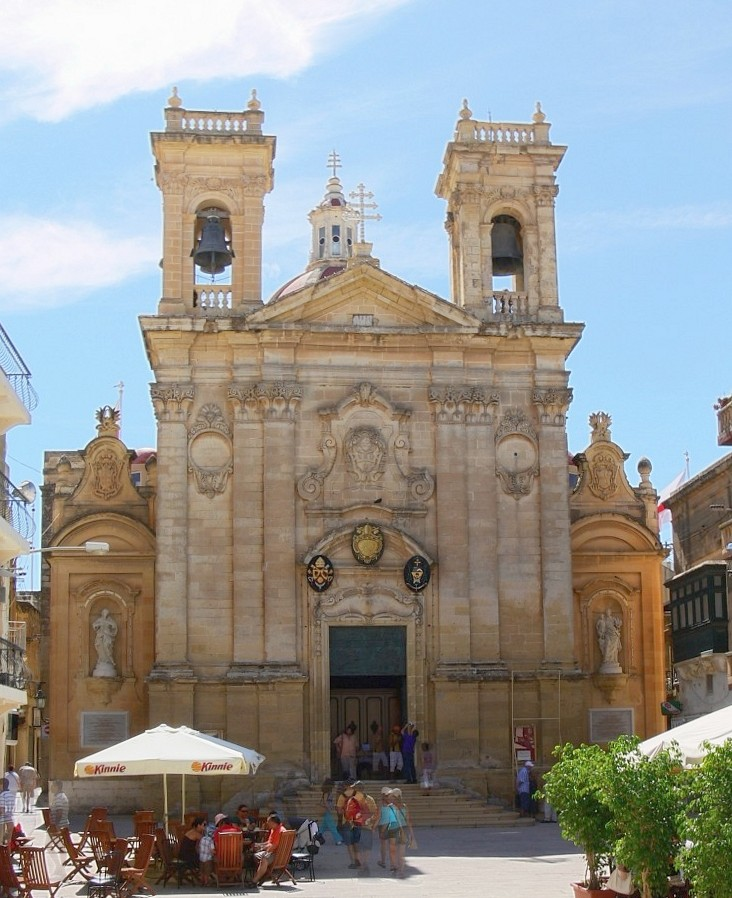
Saint George's Basilica.

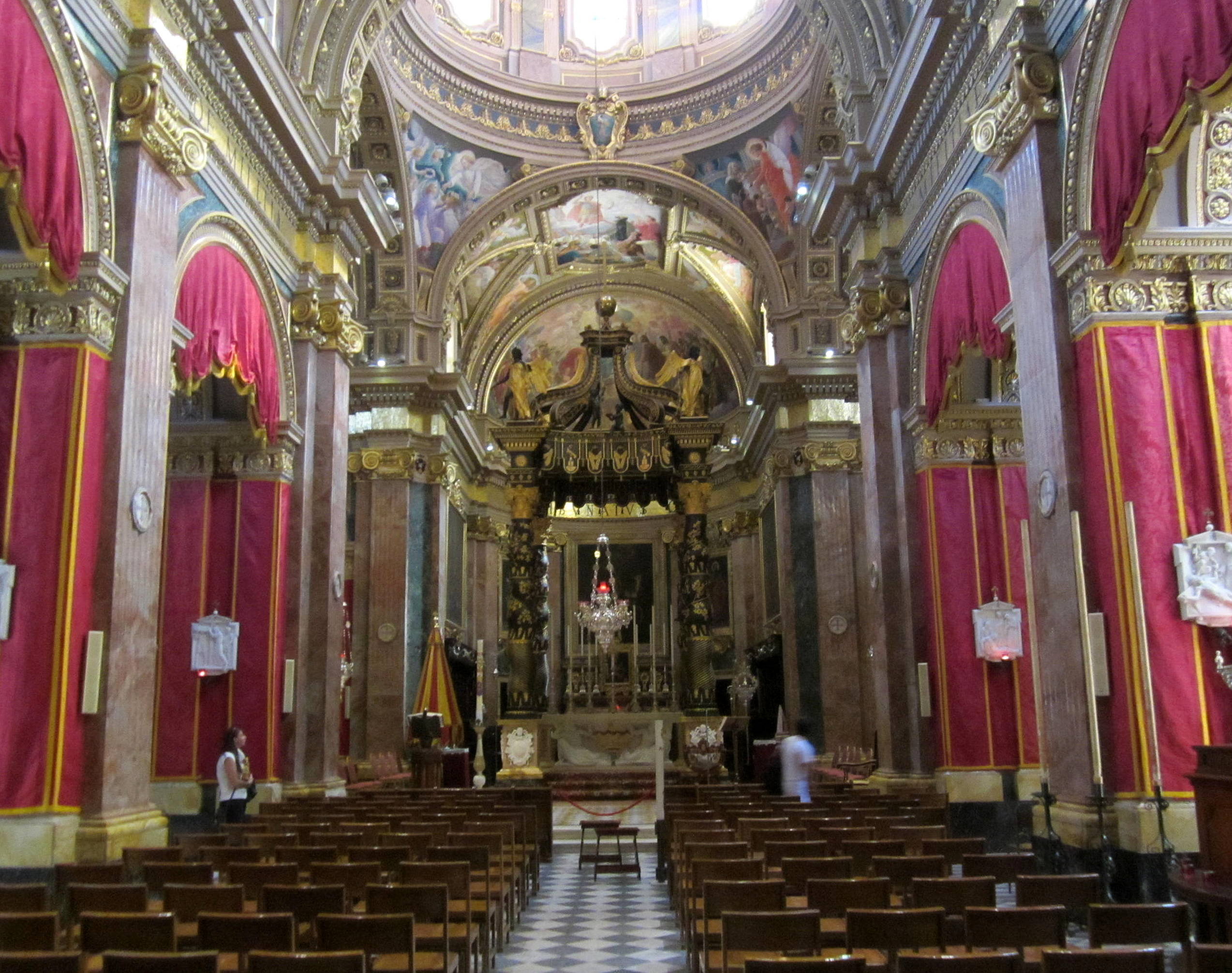
Interior of St George's Basilica

=== Villa Rundle Gardens ===
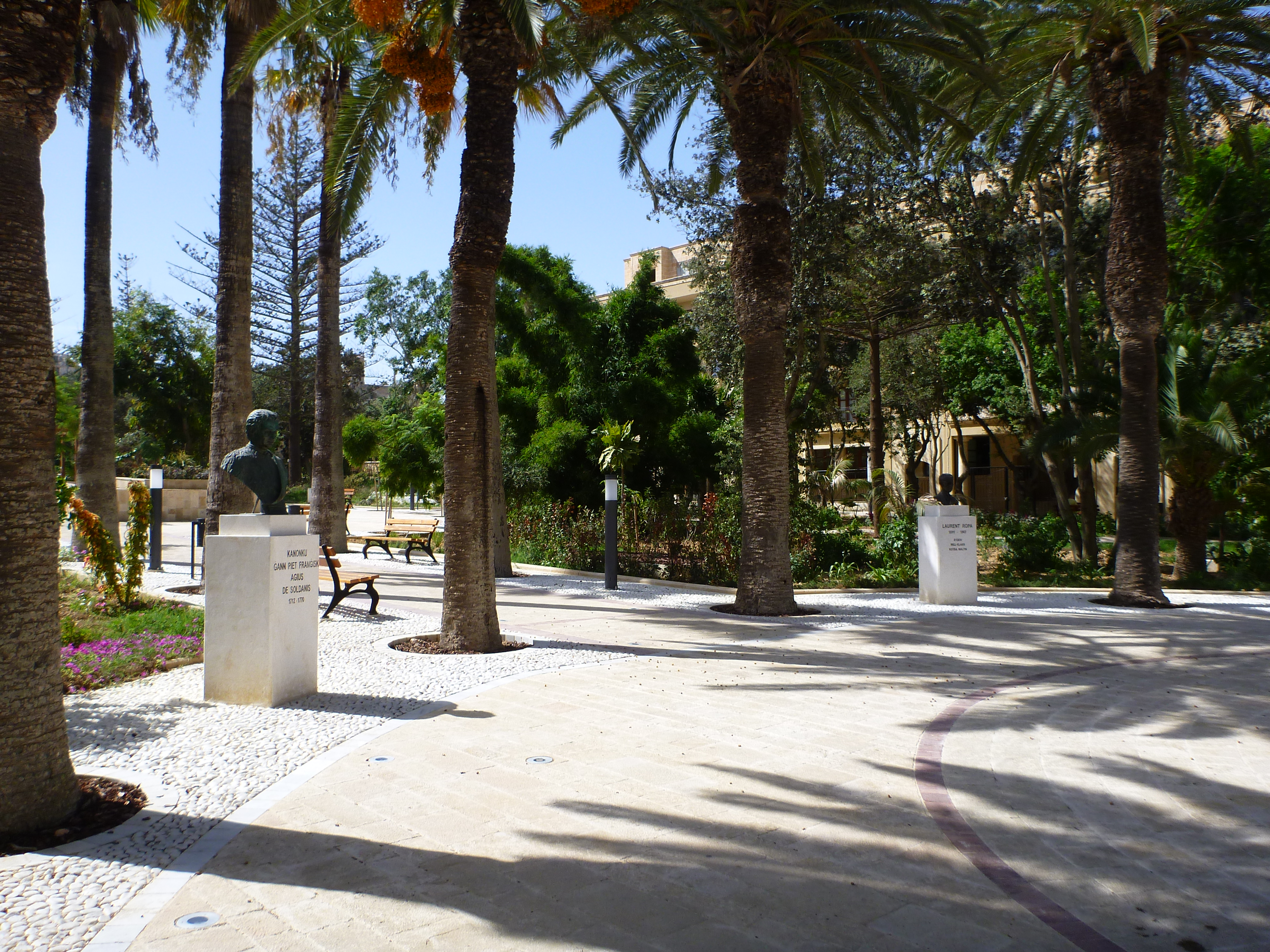
Busts of de Soldanis and Laurent Ropa at Villa Rundle

These gardens are situated between Republic Street and the Main Car Park in Victoria. One can see in these gardens a bronze bust of the Gozitan 18th-century historian and grammarian Canon Giovanni Pietro Francesco Agius de Soldanis and another of Gozo born French poet and writer Laurent Ropa. One can also find a memorial commemorating the invasion of Gozo by Ottomans in 1551.

== Notable people ==
- Myriam Spiteri Debono, current President of Malta
- Ċensu Tabone, 4th President of Malta
- Gaetano Pace Forno, Bishop of Malta
- Ġorġ Pisani, Poet
- Giovanni Pietro Francesco Agius de Soldanis, Archpriest
- Giuseppe Monsignor Pace, 7th Bishop of Gozo
- Joseph Farrugia, (Archpriest Emeritus of St George's)
- Joseph Monsignor Mercieca, Archbishop of Malta
- Sir Pietro Monsignor Pace, Titular Archbishop of Rhodes and Bishop of Malta
- Alfred Xuereb, private secretary to Pope Francis
- Mary Meilak, Malta's first female poet
- Ninu Cremona, author

== Zones in Victoria ==
- Belliegħa
- Ċittadella (Citadel)
- Demnija
- Gelmus
- Għajn Lukin
- Il-Ġnien
- Qasam San Ġorġ
- Sellum
- Ta' Ħamet
- Tal-Ibraġ
- Ta' Mliet
- Ta' Wara s-Sur
- Taċ-Ċawla
- Taflija
- Tal-Far
- Tal-Grazzja
- Tal-Maltija
- Tal-Mejda
- Villa Rundle
- Wied Tal-Grazzja
- Kapuċċini

== Victoria's main roads ==
- Pjazza Fuq it-Tomba (Tomba Square)
- Pjazza Indipendenza (Independence Square)
- Pjazza San Frangisk (St Francis Square)
- Pjazza San Gorg (St George's Square)
- Pjazza Santu Wistin (St Augustine Square)
- Triq Dingli (Dingli Street)
- Triq Enriku Mizzi (Enrico Mizzi Street)
- Triq Fortunato Mizzi (Fortunato Mizzi Street)
- Triq Gedrin
- Triq George Borg Olivier
- Triq Għajn Qatet
- Triq Ġużè Ellul Mercer (G. Ellul Mercer Street)
- Triq id-Dawwara
- Triq il-Kappuċċini (Capuchins' Street)
- Triq il-Papa Ġwanni Pawlu II (Pope John Paul II Street)
- Triq ir-Repubblika (Republic Street)
- Triq it-Tabib Anton Tabone (Dr Anton Tabone Street)
- Triq l-Ewropa (Europe Street)
- Triq l-Imgħallem (Foreman Street)
- Triq Mejlak (Mejlak Road)
- Triq Monsinjur S. Lanzon (Mgr. S. Lanzon Street)
- Triq Ninu Cremona (Ninu Cremona Street)
- Triq Putirjal (Main Gate Street)
- Triq Sant' Orsla (St Ursola Street)
- Triq Ta' Kerċem (Kercem Road)
- Triq Tomba (Tomba Street)
- Triq Viani (Viani Street)
- Triq Wara s-Sur (By the Bastion Street)
- Triq Wied il-Lunzjata (Lunzjata Valley Road)i

== Education ==
Gozo College Boys' Secondary School is a public school located in Victoria.

== Feasts of Victoria, Gozo ==
Five feasts are celebrated in Victoria, the island of Gozo, the two main feasts are the feast of St. George and the feast of Assumption of the Virgin Mary. The feast dedicated to St. Mary, devoted in its Cathedral situated in the centre of the Citadel dominating the whole island is celebrated on 15 August. The other one is dedicated to St. George, the patron saint of Gozo celebrated on the 3rd Sunday of July in St George's Basilica.

In Victoria, there is the feast of the Immaculate Conception in the church of St Francis. This feast is celebrated on 8 December of every year by the Franciscan conventual friars. A feast of Our Lady of Divine Grace is celebrated as the last feast of the feast season by the Franciscan capuchin friars in the church dedicated to Our Lady of Divine Grace. The feast of St. John Bosco is celebrated in the Don Bosco Oratory.

== Sport ==
Victoria is home to three football clubs, S.K. Victoria Wanderers, Victoria Hotspurs and Oratory Youths.

== Twin towns – sister cities ==
Victoria is twinned with:

- Nichelino, Italy
