= Church of the Nativity of Our Lady =

Church in Victoria, Gozo, Malta

Church of the Nativity of Mary
- Knisja tal-Adorazzjoni Perpetwa ta' Savina
- Knisja ta' Savina
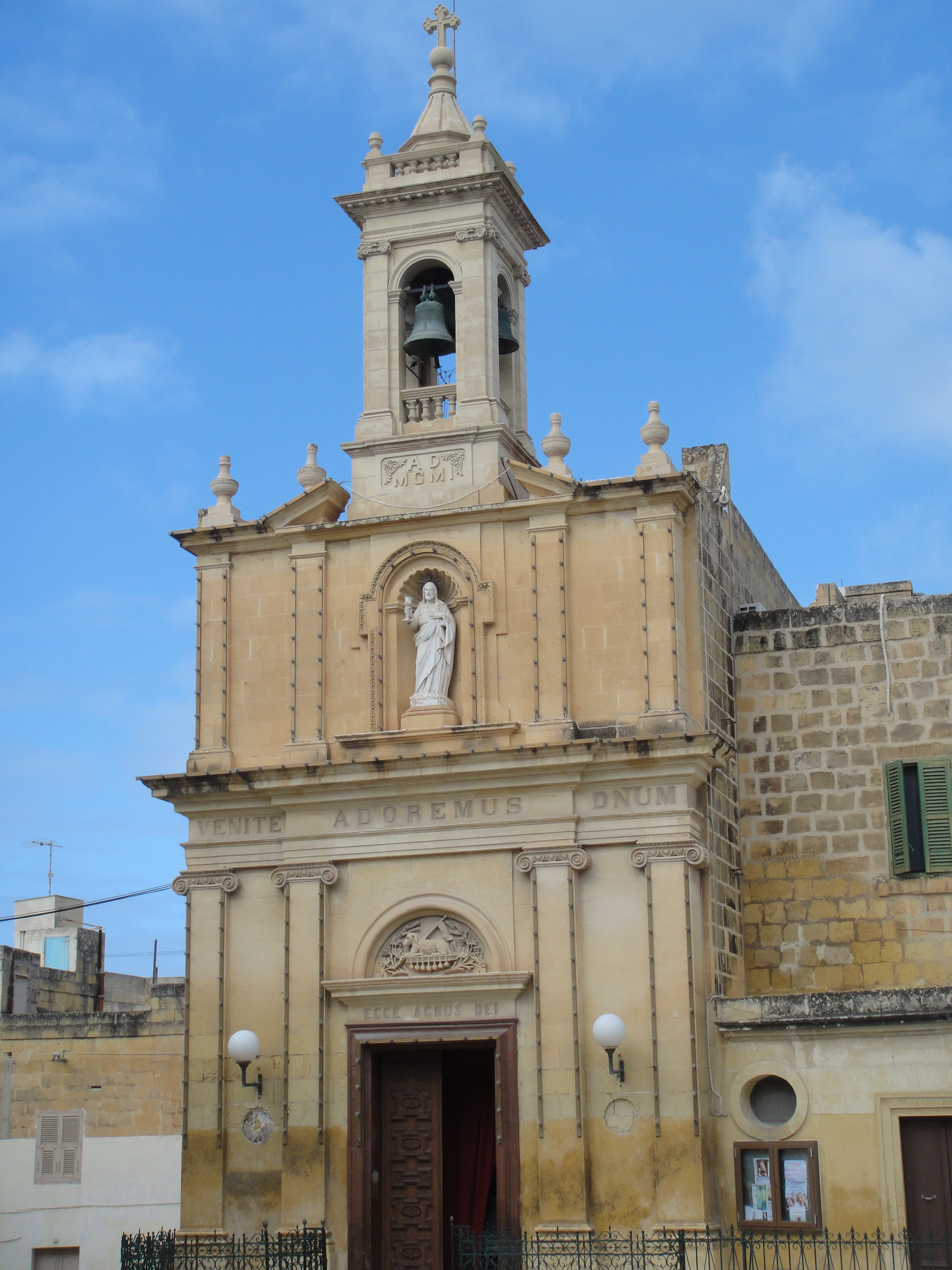

- Location within Malta
- 36°02′41.9″N 14°14′17.1″E
- Location: Victoria, Gozo
- Country: Malta
- Denomination: Roman Catholic

History
- Status: Church
- Founded: 10th Century
- Founder: Monsignor Luigi Vella
- Dedication: Nativity of Mary
- Consecrated: 17 February 1904
- Events: 1445: The church is first documented. 1479: Mentioned in notarial deeds as a night-time parish for locals. 1622: The main altar painting depicting the birth of the Virgin Mary was commissioned by Gozo's governor Riccardo de Nini Claret.1901: The current building was constructed. 1904: The church was consecrated on February 17.1934: The statue of the Nativity (il-Bambina) by Wistin Camilleri was brought to the church. 2024: Underwent extensive restoration by the Directorate for Cultural Heritage.

Architecture
- Functional status: Active
- Architect: Vincenzo Busuttil
- Architectural type: Church
- Style: Baroque
- Completed: 1913

Administration
- District: Gozo
- Province: Malta
- Diocese: Gozo
- Parish: St Mary's parish Victoria

Clergy
- Bishop: Anton Teuma
- Rector: Mgr. Joe Vella Gauci

The Church of the Nativity of Our Lady, more commonly known in Maltese as Ta' Savina, is a church situated in the heart of Victoria, in the island of Gozo, part of the Maltese archipelago.

== Origins ==
The original church was one of the earliest church buildings in Gozo. It was mentioned in notarial deeds of 1479. Other sources trace this church to the time of Count Roger I of Sicily. The church was rebuilt in 1502. Together with that of St. James and St. George's, this church served as the parish church for the locals during the night time since the parish of St. Mary in the Cittadella was inaccessible for people living outside the fortified city. As the threat of a barbarian invasion decreased, Savina and St. James's lost their parochial status and Victoria was left with two main parishes. Burials used to take place in the church yard up until 1899.

== Present days ==
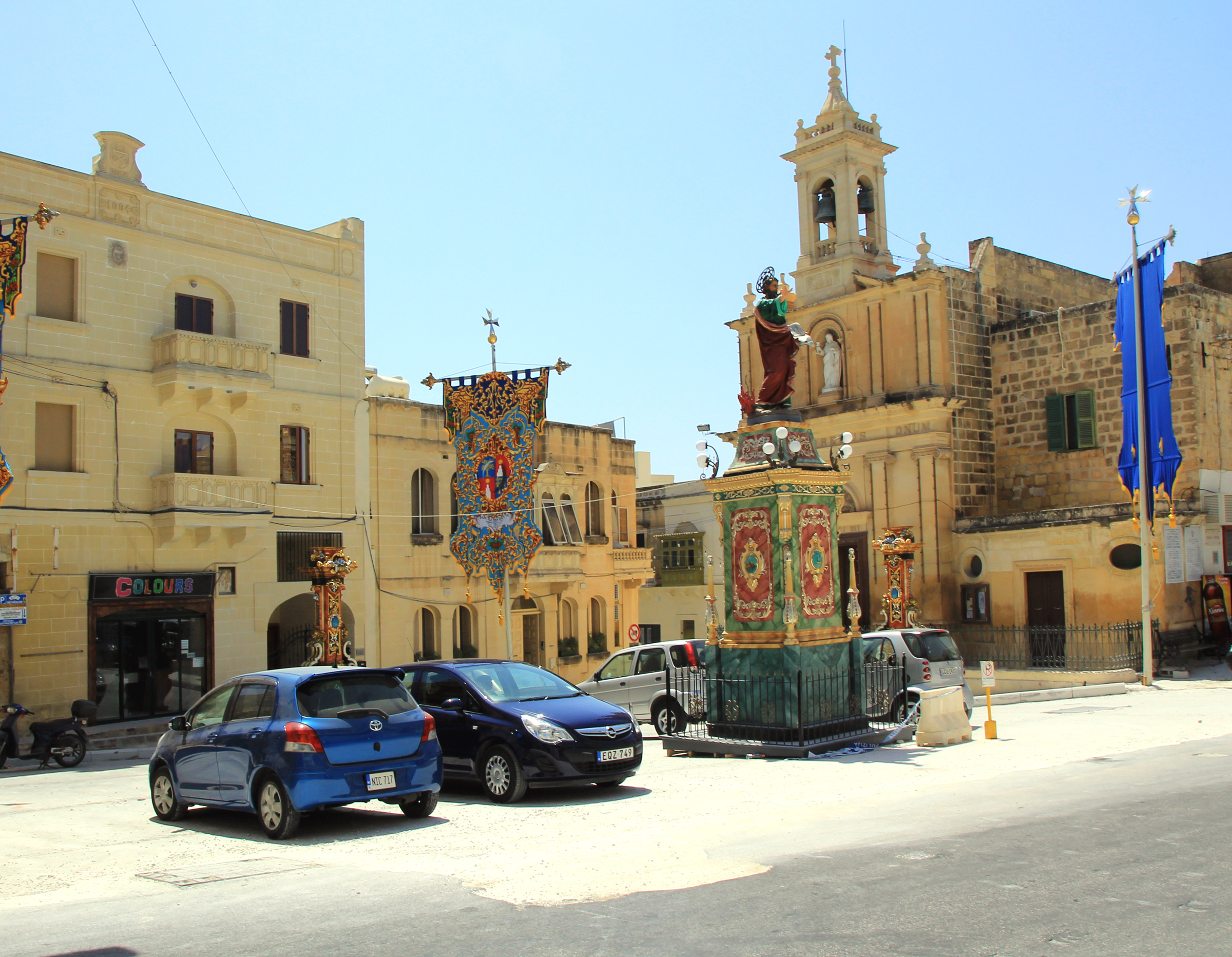
Ta' Savina church

The present church was built in the early 20th century. The cathedral chapter had approved plans for the rebuilding of Savina church. Works started in 1901 and finished in 1904. The church was consecrated on February 17, 1904. In 1913 the church was further enlarged. The church was reopened in the same year by Cardinal Domenico Ferrata, a Papal delegate for the Eucharistic Congress. Monsignor Luigi Vella was appointed as the first rector of the church. Monsignor Vella was the one who worked to rebuild the church and open it for perpetual adoration. He was later appointed Archdeacon of the cathedral.

The church building is listed on the National Inventory of the Cultural Property of the Maltese Islands.

== Works of Art ==
The main altar painting depicts the birth of the Virgin Mary. It dates to 1622 and was commissioned by the governor of Gozo Riccardo de Nini Claret.

== See also ==
- Culture of Malta
- History of Malta – Maltese history
- List of Churches in Malta
- Religion in Malta
