= Golden Calf of Gozo =

Golden calf statue

The Golden Calf of Gozo (Maltese: L-Għoġol tad-Deheb) is a golden statue of a calf that was supposedly discovered buried under the Hill of Ta' Gelmus in 1729 on the island of Gozo, Malta. It was supposedly brought by Jewish refugees from the destruction of Jerusalem and buried by expelled Jews around 1494, before they left the island. Whether it was the original Golden Calf is open to interpretation.

== Legend ==
A farmer named Sidor [needs verification] is supposed to have had unearthed a golden horn from the Calf in one of his fields, after having been told of the statue by a stranger. He asked a merchant named Pupull for advice on selling the statue, but the merchant tricked him into turning the statue over to him for a few coins. When the farmer's wife found out, she became angry and told her neighbours about the deal. The story reached the ears of the grand-master who sent men to investigate. Concerned, Pupull and the hakem (governor) hid the statue, fooling the men. Finally the grand master himself came to investigate. He became suspicious after meeting the hakem and talked to the farmer who told him the whole story. The hakem was dismissed from his post. Pupull refused to tell where he had hidden it. He was imprisoned in the dungeons of Fort St Angelo, but died under torture without revealing the location of the Calf.

Another version of the legend changes the merchant to a goldsmith, Calogero.

A Maltese poem called "L-Għoġol tad-Deheb" and written by F. X. Mangion refers to this legend.

== Factual version ==
A cave was discovered in 1729 near Inland Sea, Dwejra Point, that once held the statue of a golden calf on a solid gold pedestal. Some of the details of the legend match with this story, naming the grand master as Manoel de Vilhena. Pupull's name is given as Dr. Cassar.

Count Ciantar states that on Ghelmus hill near Żebbuġ, Gozo a golden calf was found in 1729. Baron Bali de Stadl wrote a dissertation about it. It was likely of Phoenician origin.

== Resources ==
- Ashby, T. "Roman Malta" Journal of Roman History 5 (1915): 23-80 JSTOR 296290
- Mizzi, Pawlu (2000). Il-leġġenda taʼ l-gh̄oġol tad-deheb. Leġġendi Maltin (in Maltese). Valletta: Klabb Kotba Maltin. ISBN 9789990975703.
