= Il-Lunzjata Valley =

Valley in Rabat, Gozo, Malta

- Wied Il-Lunzjata
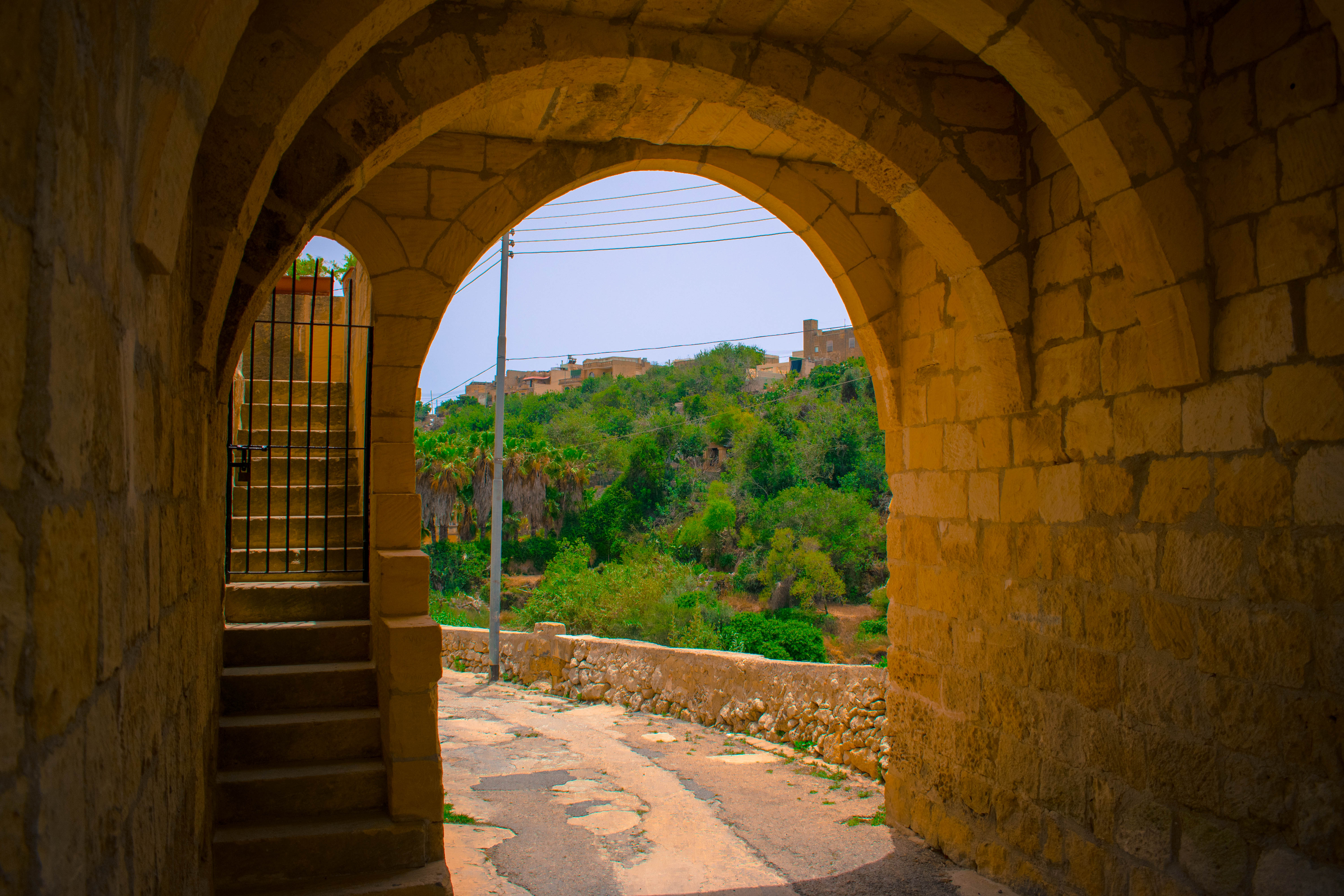
- The archway leading to the valley.

- Location within Malta Location within Europe
- Floor elevation: 197 ft (60 m)
- Length: 0.4 km (0.25 mi) South
- Width: 0.17 km (0.11 mi) West
- Area: 0.1 km^{2} (0.039 mi^{2})

Geography
- Location: Victoria, Gozo, Malta
- Coordinates: 36°2′21″N 14°13′58″E
- Interactive map of Il-Lunzjata Valley

Il-Lunzjata Valley (Maltese: Wied Il-Lunzjata) is an agricultural valley located southwest of Victoria, Gozo. The valley is known for its lush fields and hospitaller-era chapel. Running freshwater is very common on the valley bottom during autumn and spring. This supply of freshwater is commonly put to use for the farming of crops in fields within the valley through a number of channels dug on the ground. The valley is also home to an old fountain that makes use of the freshwater which was restored in 2007. Lunzjata is also considered a Natura 2000 site.
