= Old St Joseph's in the Citadel =

- The Church of St Joseph
- Knisja ta' San Ġużepp
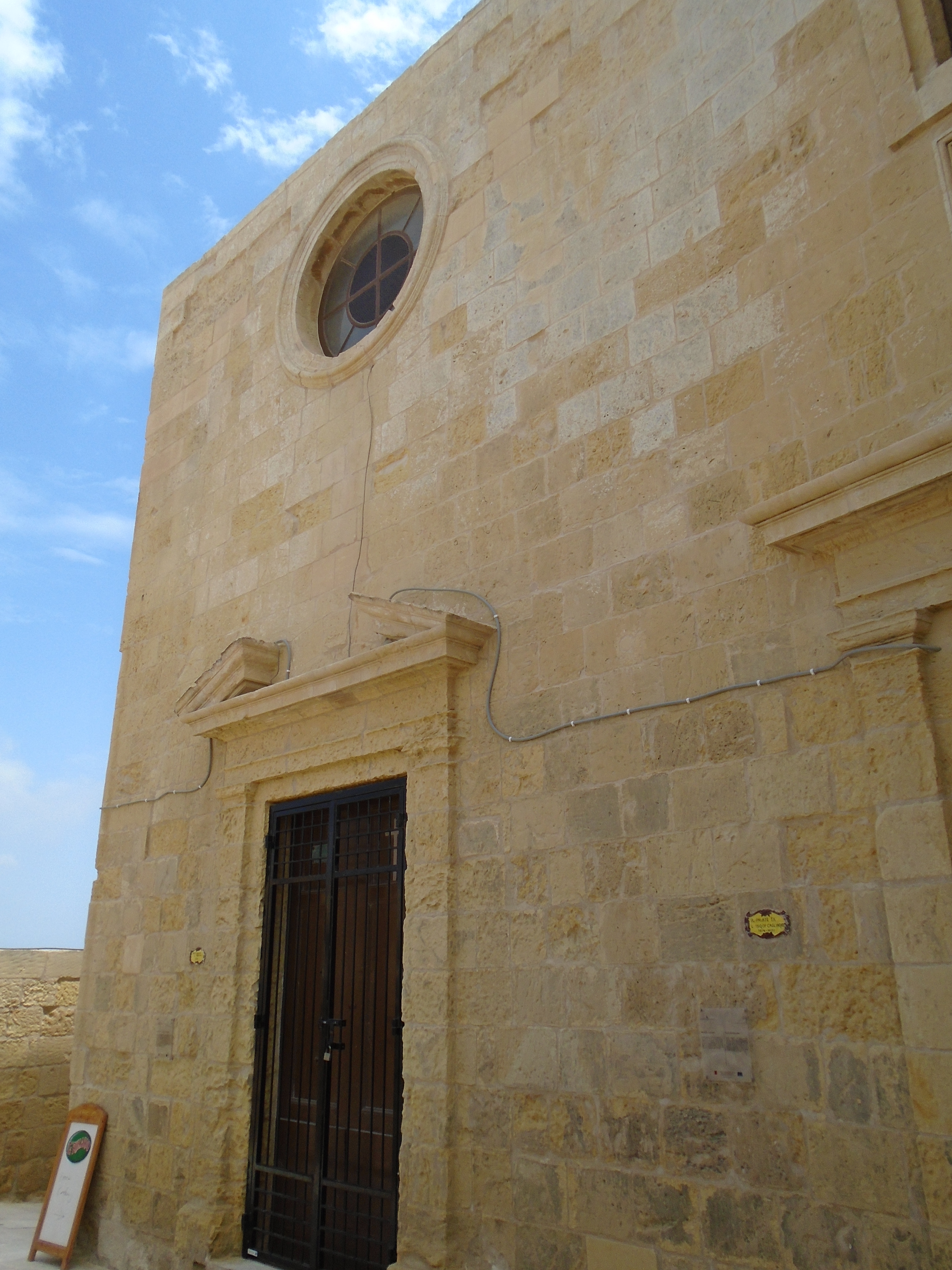

- Location within Malta
- 36°02′48.4″N 14°14′23.0″E
- Location: Victoria, Gozo
- Country: Malta
- Denomination: Roman Catholic

History
- Former name: St Nicholas
- Status: Church
- Dedication: Saint Joseph
- Dedicated: 15 August 1976

Architecture
- Functional status: Active
- Architect: Vittorio Cassar
- Architectural type: Church

Administration
- Province: Malta
- Diocese: Gozo
- Parish: St Mary's parish Victoria

Clergy
- Bishop: Mario Grech
- Rector: Joe Bezzina

Old St Joseph's in the Citadel is a Roman Catholic Church located in the medieval walled Cittadella in Victoria, Gozo, Malta.

== History ==
Records show that a chapel already existed on the site during the mid 16th century. In fact, when inquisitor Pietro Dusina visited the Citadel he recalled that there were four churches dedicated to St Lawrence, St Nicholas, St John the Baptist's and Our Saviour's, respectively. The original St Joseph's was the one dedicated to St Nicholas. Its congregation grew when Dusina deconsecrated it Lawrence's in 1575 and the faithful turned to St Nicholas' which was described as the church which was best kept and equipped.

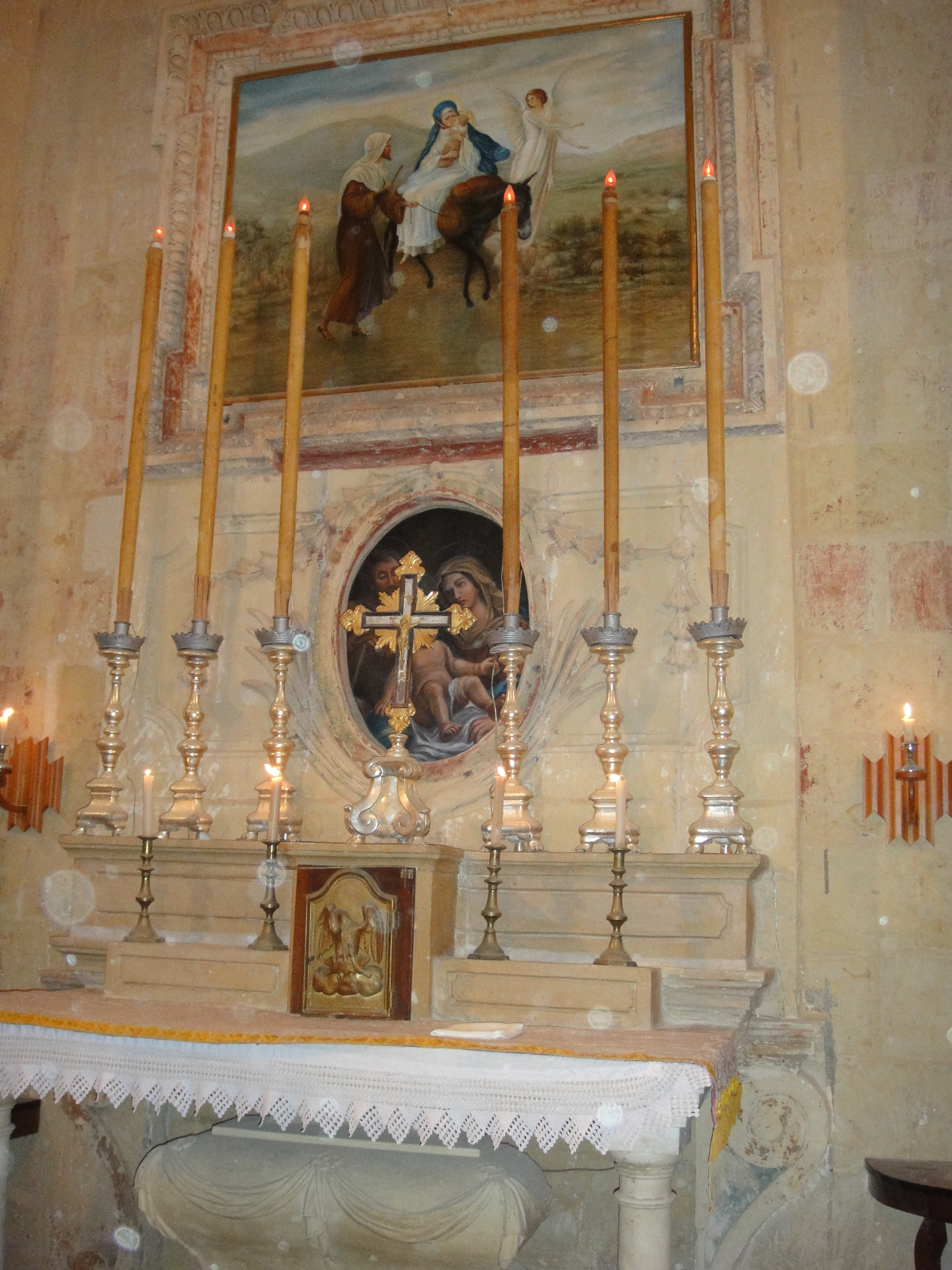
High Altar of the church

The church plan was altered by orders of Bishop Baldassare Cagliares on plans by Vittorio Cassar. Works concluded by 1625. Consequently, the dedication of the church was changed from that of St Nicholas to St Joseph, the first church on the island to bear the name of St Joseph. A palace was also built adjacent to the church as a residence to Bishop Cagliares. On St Joseph's day, the Chapter of St Mary's Collegiate Church used to celebrate vespers every year from 1672.

The church was severely damaged during the earthquake of 1693. Consequently, services no longer were held in the church and it was abandoned. It was only in 1930 that interest was awaken to restore the chapel. The lieutenant Governor of Malta, Sir Harry Luke expressed interest in restoring buildings which had historic value. Restoration works were at a halt when Sir Luke was transferred somewhere else. In 1973 restoration works commenced once more and works were completed by 19 March 1975. The church was blessed by Bishop Nikol Joseph Cauchi on August 15, 1976.
