= Il-Gelmus =

Hill in Malta

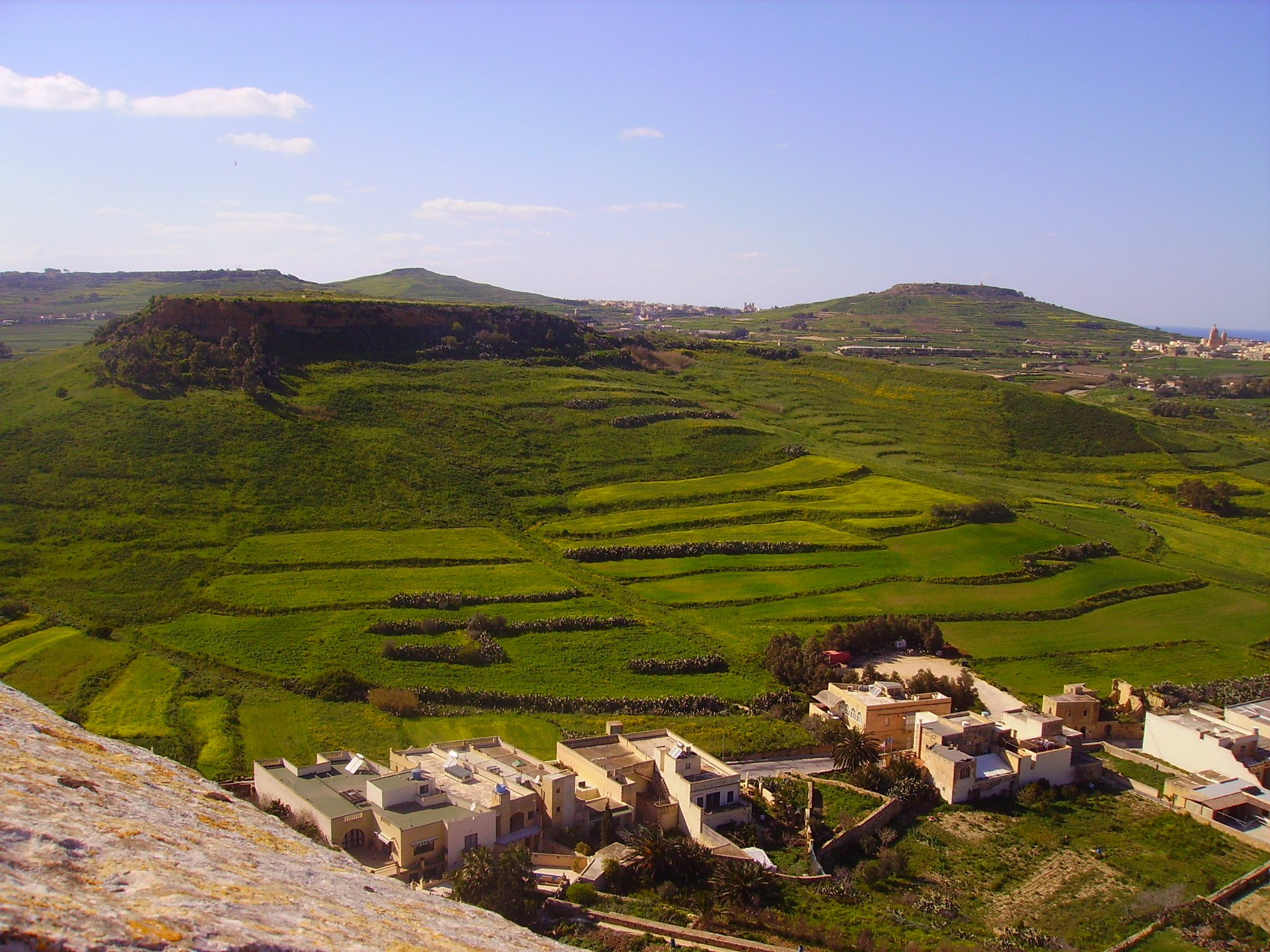
- Gelmus as seen from the Cittadella.

Highest point
- Elevation: 133 m (436 ft)
- Coordinates: 36°03′N 14°14′E

Geography
- Location within Malta
- Location: Victoria, Gozo, Malta

Il-Gelmus is a hill located in Victoria, Gozo, Malta, 1 kilometre away from Victoria's city centre. The estimated terrain elevation above sea level is 133 metres. The width at the base is 0.56 kilometres. In the area around Il-Gelmus are peninsulas, rock formations, beaches and caves.

The coordinates of Il-Gelmus are 36°02'55"N 14°13'58.01"E.

This hill has the maximum thickness of greensand layer in the Maltese archipelago. The greensand layer in Gelmus reaches a maximum of 11 metres.

This area is related to the legend of the Golden Calf of Gozo, and is also mentioned in the Maltese poem "L-Għoġol tad-Deheb" by F. X. Mangion that also refers to this same legend.

== Climate ==
The climate of the area is temperate. Average annual temperature in the neighborhood is 18°C. The warmest month is July when the average temperature is 26°C and the coldest is in January, with 12°C. The average annual rainfall is 581 millimetres. The rainiest month is November, with an average of 157mm of precipitation, and the driest is July, with 1mm of rainfall.

== See also ==
- Geography of Malta
