= Annunciation Chapel, Victoria =

Church of the Annunciation
- Knisja tal-Lunzjata
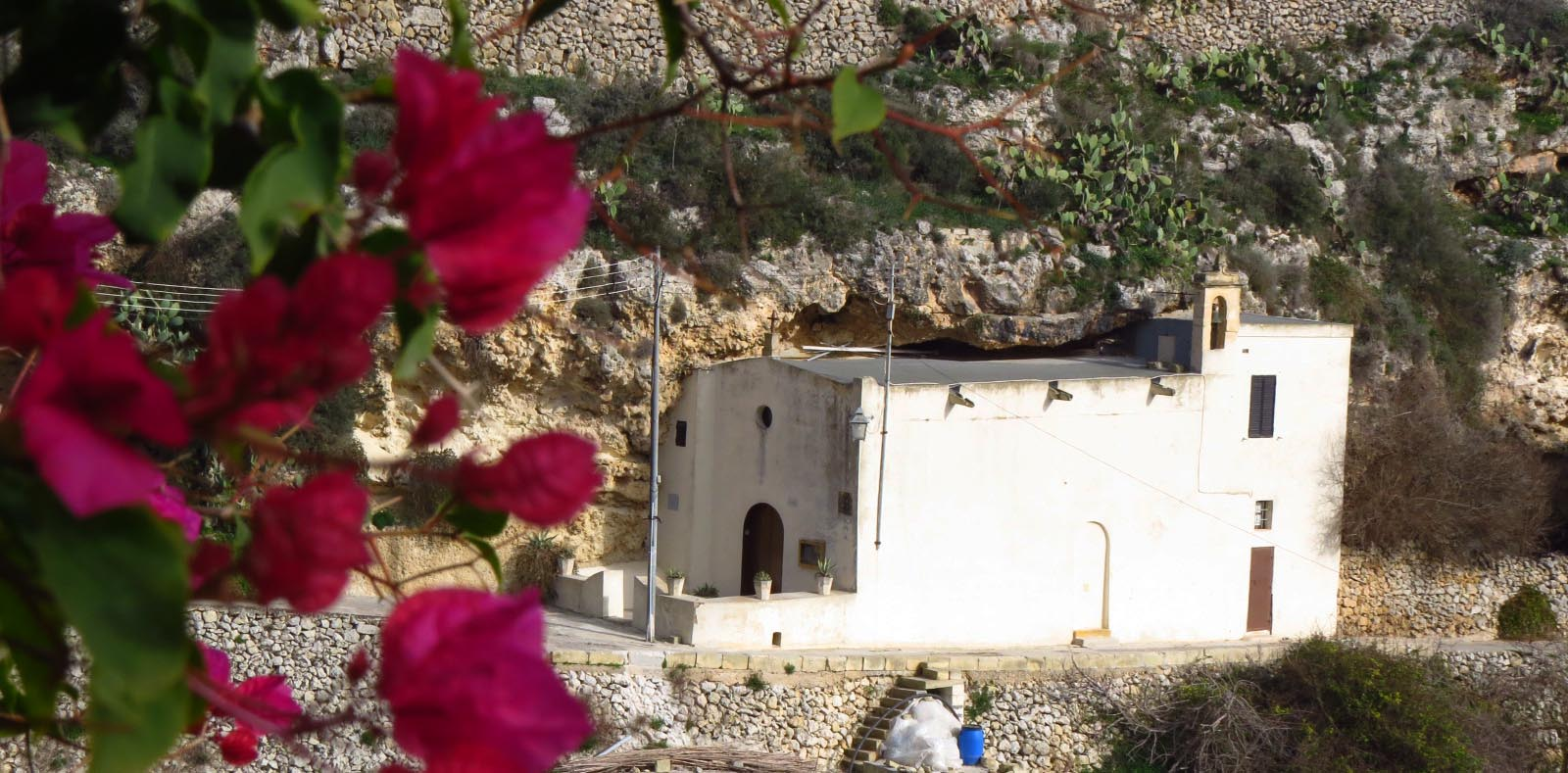

- Location within Malta
- 36°02′27.6″N 14°13′58.5″E
- Location: Victoria, Gozo
- Country: Malta
- Denomination: Roman Catholic

History
- Status: Church
- Founded: 14th century
- Dedication: Annunciation

Architecture
- Functional status: Active

Administration
- Province: Malta
- Diocese: Gozo

Clergy
- Bishop: Mario Grech

The Chapel of the Annunciation or the Lunzjata Chapel is a small Roman Catholic church built into a cave in a valley known as the Lunzjata Valley in Victoria, Gozo, Malta.

== History ==
The original chapel of the Annunciation goes back to at least 1347. Documents from the 14th century reveal that the church was a Jus patronatus founded by Dona Sibila of Aragon. When she died, the Jus patronatus passed to the kings of Sicily, who at that time ruled Malta. On November 12, 1372, the chapel was handed over to a Maltese priest Don Bartolommeo Asciach who was probably its second rector. Up until the Knights Hospitaller's arrival in Malta in 1530, the chapel was mostly administered by the nobility of Aragon and Sicily. When the knights came they took over and appointed Don Pietro Burlo as its rector.

The chapel was rebuilt in 1629 by its rector Don Paolo Tabone. After WWII the chapel was restored extensively and was finally consecrated by the Bishop of Gozo Giuseppe Pace on October 18, 1959.

== Interior ==
The chapel has one altar and one titular painting depicting the Annunciation of Jesus, the work of Luca Garnier. The painting was commissioned by rector Nicola Mangion in 1644.

== See also ==
- Catholic Church in Malta
