= Church of St Augustine, Victoria =

Church of St Augustine
- Knisja ta' Sant' Wistin
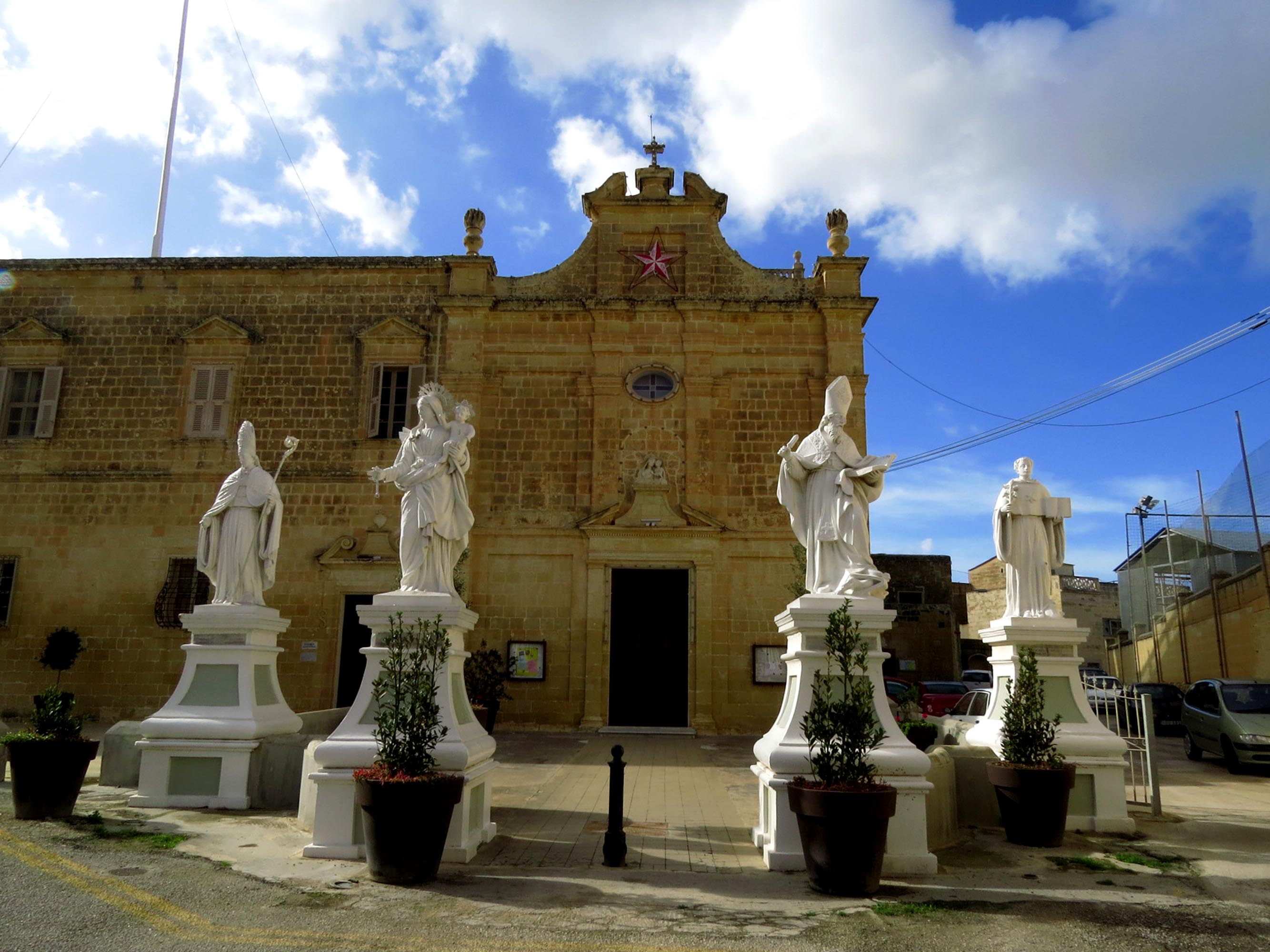
- Façade of the Church of St Augustine

- Location within Malta
- 36°02′32.9″N 14°14′13.0″E
- Location: Victoria, Gozo
- Country: Malta
- Denomination: Roman Catholic

History
- Status: Conventual Church
- Founded: 1492
- Founder: Jacob de Leo Provincial
- Dedication: St Augustine of Hippo
- Consecrated: 12 May 1782

Architecture
- Functional status: Active
- Architectural type: Church
- Style: Baroque
- Completed: 1666

Administration
- Province: Malta
- Diocese: Gozo
- Parish: St George's Parish Victoria

Clergy
- Bishop: Mario Grech
- Rector: Felix Buttigieg

The Church of St Augustine is a Roman Catholic church building in Victoria, Gozo, Malta, situated in St Augustine's Square. The church is part of the Augustinian monastery situated on its left side.

== Origins ==
The order of St Augustine is the oldest religious order in Gozo and probably the first such order in Gozo to establish permanent residence in Malta. Before establishing themselves in Victoria the order lived in Xagħra near a small church dedicated to Our Lady of the Seven Joys. The earliest mention of the Victoria monastery and church date to 1435 but some researchers claim that the monastery already existed in 1260. In October 1652, Pope Innocent X ordered the monastery and church to be closed but they were reopened after 4 months through the intervention of Grand Master Giovanni Paolo Lascaris.

== Enlargement ==
In the 17th century the church was rebuilt and the monastery enlarged. The church was finished sometime between 1662 and 1666. The church was consecrated by the Bishop of Malta, Vincenzo Labini on 12 May 1782. The works on the monastery were finished by 1717.

== Works of art ==
The main attraction of this church is the titular altar piece depicting Augustine of Hippo, John the Baptist and William I, Duke of Aquitaine. It was painted by Mattia Preti in 1694 and paid for by Giovanni Gurgion. In 1836 the corpse of St. Dionisia was brought from Rome and placed beneath the third lateral altar. The icon of the Blessed Virgin of Good Counsel on the main altar was brought from Rome in 1765. In 2007 some thieves stole a number of priceless ornaments that adorned the image.

The church building is listed on the National Inventory of the Cultural Property of the Maltese Islands.

== See also ==
- Culture of Malta
- History of Malta – Maltese history
- List of Churches in Malta
- Religion in Malta
