= Our Lady of Pompei Church, Victoria =

Church of Our Lady of Pompei
- Knisja tal-Madonna ta' Pompei
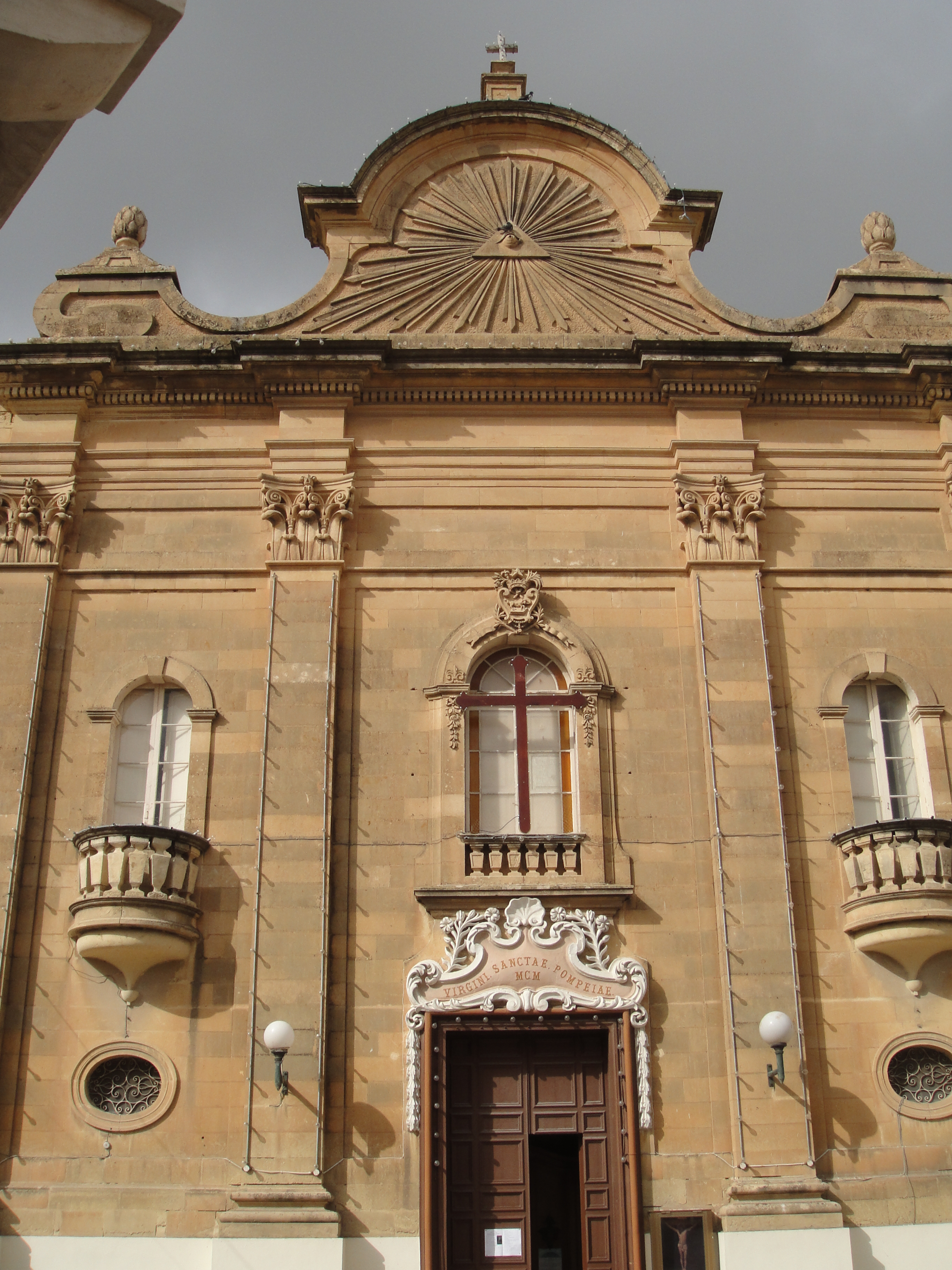

- Location within Malta
- 36°02′26.6″N 14°14′24.5″E
- Location: Victoria, Gozo
- Country: Malta
- Denomination: Roman Catholic

History
- Status: Church
- Dedication: Our Lady of Pompei
- Consecrated: 1 July 1923

Architecture
- Functional status: Active
- Architectural type: Church
- Style: Baroque
- Completed: 1900

Administration
- Province: Malta
- Diocese: Gozo
- Parish: St George's Parish Victoria

Clergy
- Bishop: Mario Grech
- Rector: Joseph Cauchi

The Church of Our Lady of Pompei (Malti: Il-Knisja tal-Madonna ta' Pompei) is a Roman Catholic Dominican church in Victoria, Gozo, Malta.

== History ==
The church was built to serve the Dominican sisters whose monastery is adjacent to the church. The monastery was built in 1889. The church was opened to the public on 25 July 1900 and consecrated on 1 July 1923 by Bishop Angelo Portelli, the Auxiliary Bishop of Malta. The titular painting depicting Our Lady of Pompei is the work of Lazzaro Pisani. Bishop Giuseppe Pace crowned the Virgin of Pompei on 16 October 1966.

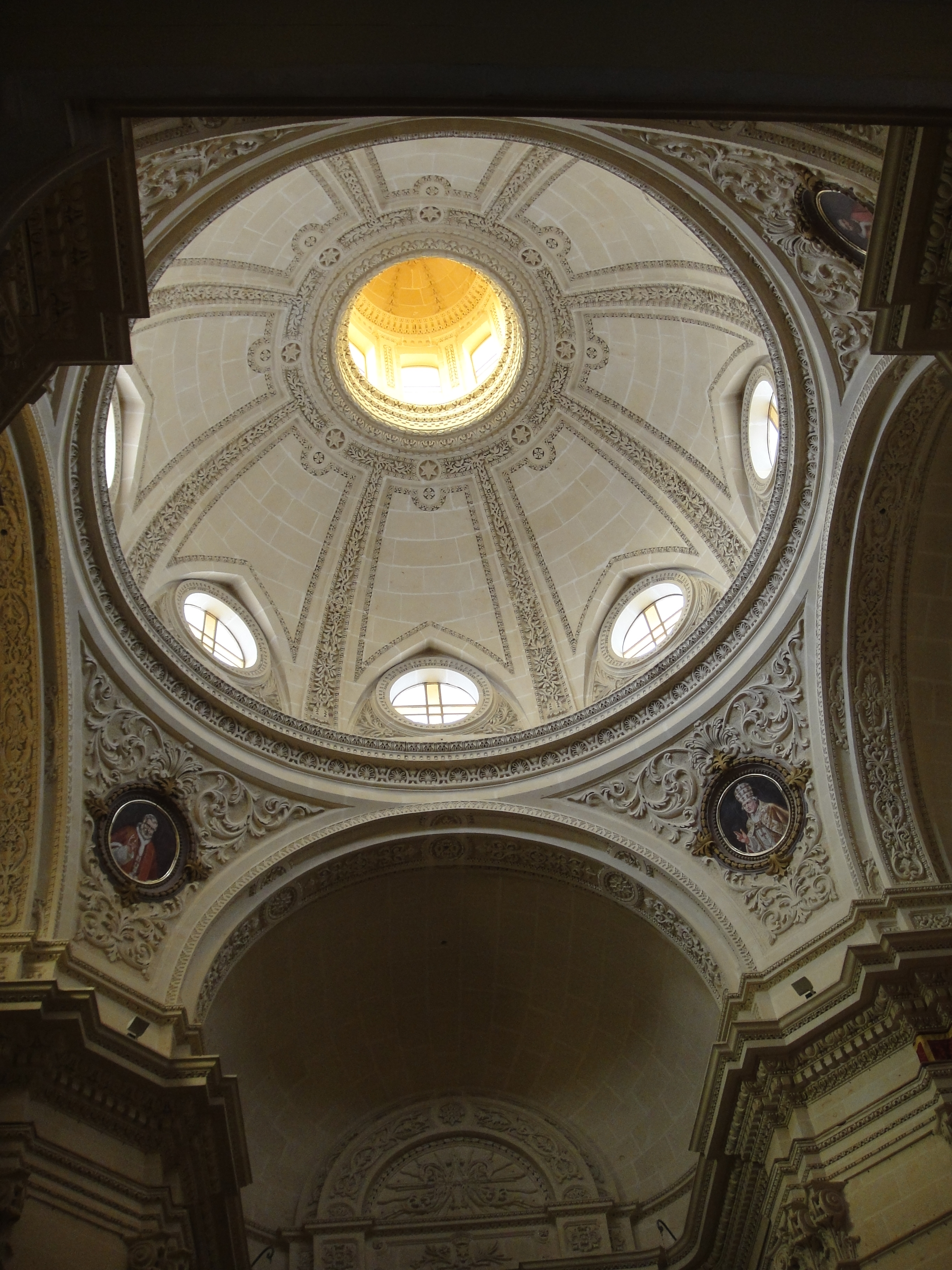
Interior of the dome of the church

Prior to 2009 a statue of Our Lady of Pompei stood on top of the dome of the church. In 2009 it was destroyed by strong winds that lashed the island. A cross has been installed on top of the dome instead.

The church building is listed on the National Inventory of the Cultural Property of the Maltese Islands.

== See also ==
- Culture of Malta
- History of Malta
- List of Churches in Malta
- Religion in Malta
