= Gozo Nature Museum =

Museum in Victoria, Malta

Coordinates: 36.0467°N 14.239°E

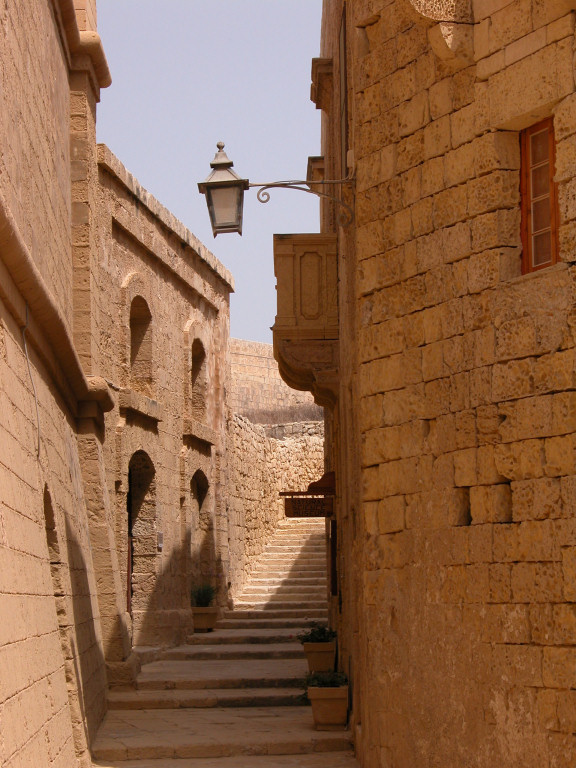
Natural Science Museum on the right

The Gozo Nature Museum, formerly known as the Natural Science Museum, is a museum in Victoria, on the island of Gozo, Malta. Open to the public since 1991, the museum is housed in a group of houses in the Cittadella, the oldest part of the city. These houses date back to various ages: the older one, which was an inn, to 1495; the other to the 17th century.

The Natural Science Museum shows collections "relating to the Island’s geology, minerals, marine life, insects, local habitats and ecosystems" as well as national plants (including the Maltese Rock Centaury), human and animal evolution.

During later years, this building was used as an inn for visitors, and is mentioned in Thomas McGill’s “Handbook, or Guide, for Strangers visiting Malta” of 1839, and described as:

an excellent house of entertainment offering clean and comfortable beds and reasonably-priced dinners.

During World War II the building served as a shelter for families during aerial bombings.

The buildings which house the museum are listed on the National Inventory of the Cultural Property of the Maltese Islands.

== See also ==
- List of museums in Malta
