= Church of St Francis, Victoria =

Conventual Church of St Francis of Assisi
- Knisja ta' San Franġisk
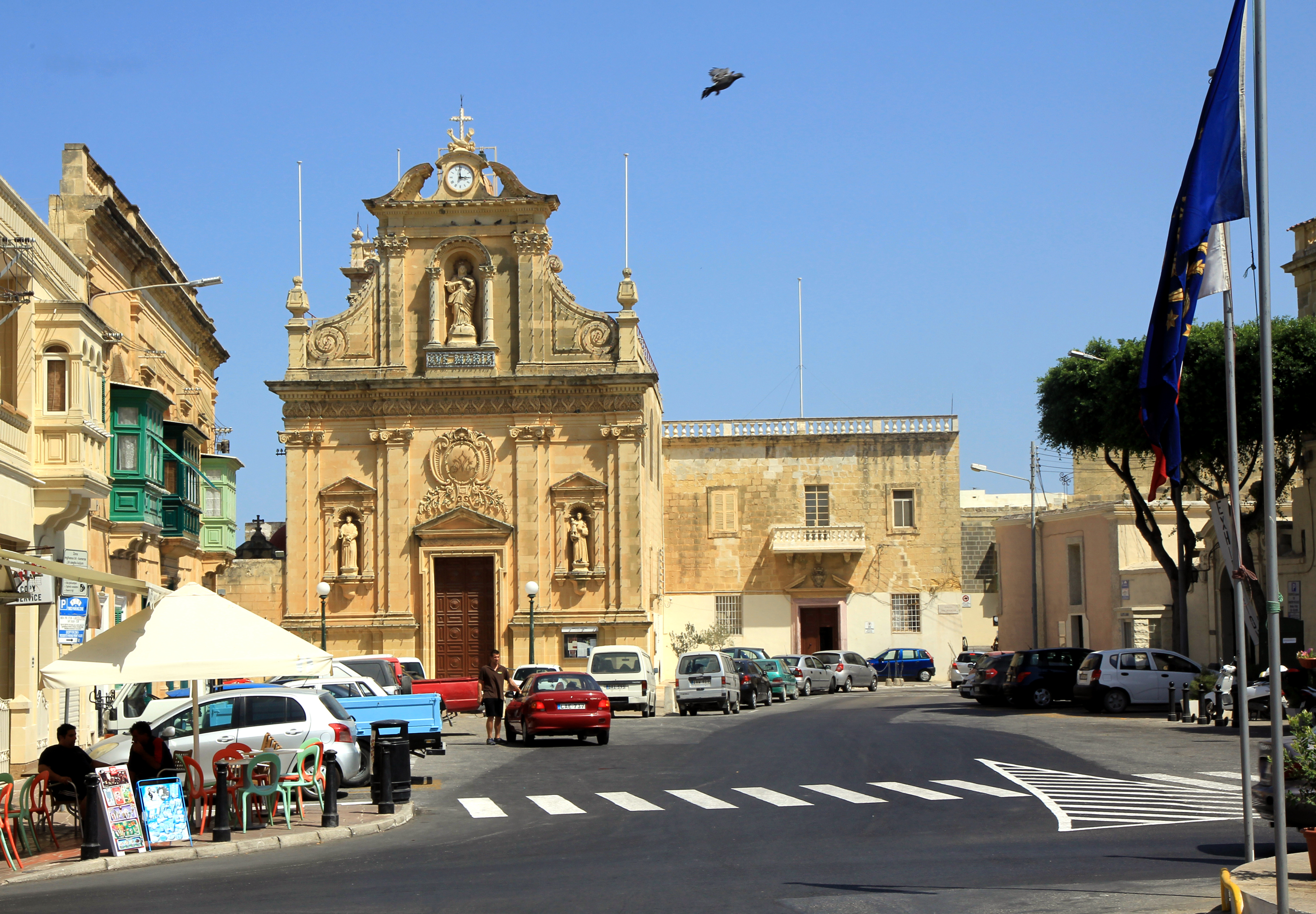

- Location within Malta
- 36°02′32.5″N 14°14′28.0″E
- Location: Victoria, Gozo
- Country: Malta
- Denomination: Roman Catholic

History
- Status: Conventual Church
- Founded: 1492
- Founder: Jacob de Leo Provincial
- Dedication: St Francis of Assisi
- Consecrated: 1906

Architecture
- Functional status: Active
- Architectural type: Church
- Style: Baroque
- Completed: 1663

Administration
- Province: Malta
- Diocese: Gozo
- Parish: St George's Parish Victoria

Clergy
- Bishop: Mario Grech
- Rector: Joseph Xerri

The Church of St Francis is a Roman Catholic church building in Victoria, Gozo, Malta, situated in St Francis Square. Adjacent to the church is the convent of the Conventual Franciscans.

== History ==
The original convent and church of St Francis date back to 1492. The original church was dedicated to St Mark. The name was changed in 1535 to that of St Francis. The present church and convent were mostly built in the 17th century. The church was completed in 1663. Grand Master António Manoel de Vilhena visited the convent and church in 1742. He stayed there from 5 to 9 June to take possession of the island. This event was commemorated by an inscription on the wall of the rooms he occupied during this five-day visit.

In December 1890 the church was closed to the public by the order of the government as it was deemed to be unsafe for use. The ceiling of the church was in a very dangerous state. The ceiling and façade were rebuilt and the church reopened on 16 April 1893. The church was consecrated by Giovanni Maria Camilleri, bishop of Gozo, in 1906.

The church building is listed on the National Inventory of the Cultural Property of the Maltese Islands.

== Works of Art ==
The titular painting of the church depicts St Francis of Assisi receiving the stigmata. It was painted by Jean-Baptiste van Loo. The church also has a statue of St Isidore the Laborer which dates back to 1680. Originally this statue was gilded in gold but then it was painted over so as not to attract the attention of the French invaders.

== Feast of the Immaculate Conception ==
A feast for the Immaculate Conception of Mary is celebrated every year on 8 December. The feat dates back to 1663 when a Confraternity of the Immaculate Conception was founded in the church to help in the organization of the mentioned feast. In 1698 a wooden statue of Our Lady representing the Immaculate Conception was used in a procession.

== See also ==
- Culture of Malta
- History of Malta
- List of Churches in Malta
- Religion in Malta
