= Church of St James, Victoria =

Church of St James the Greater
- Knisja ta' San Ġakbu
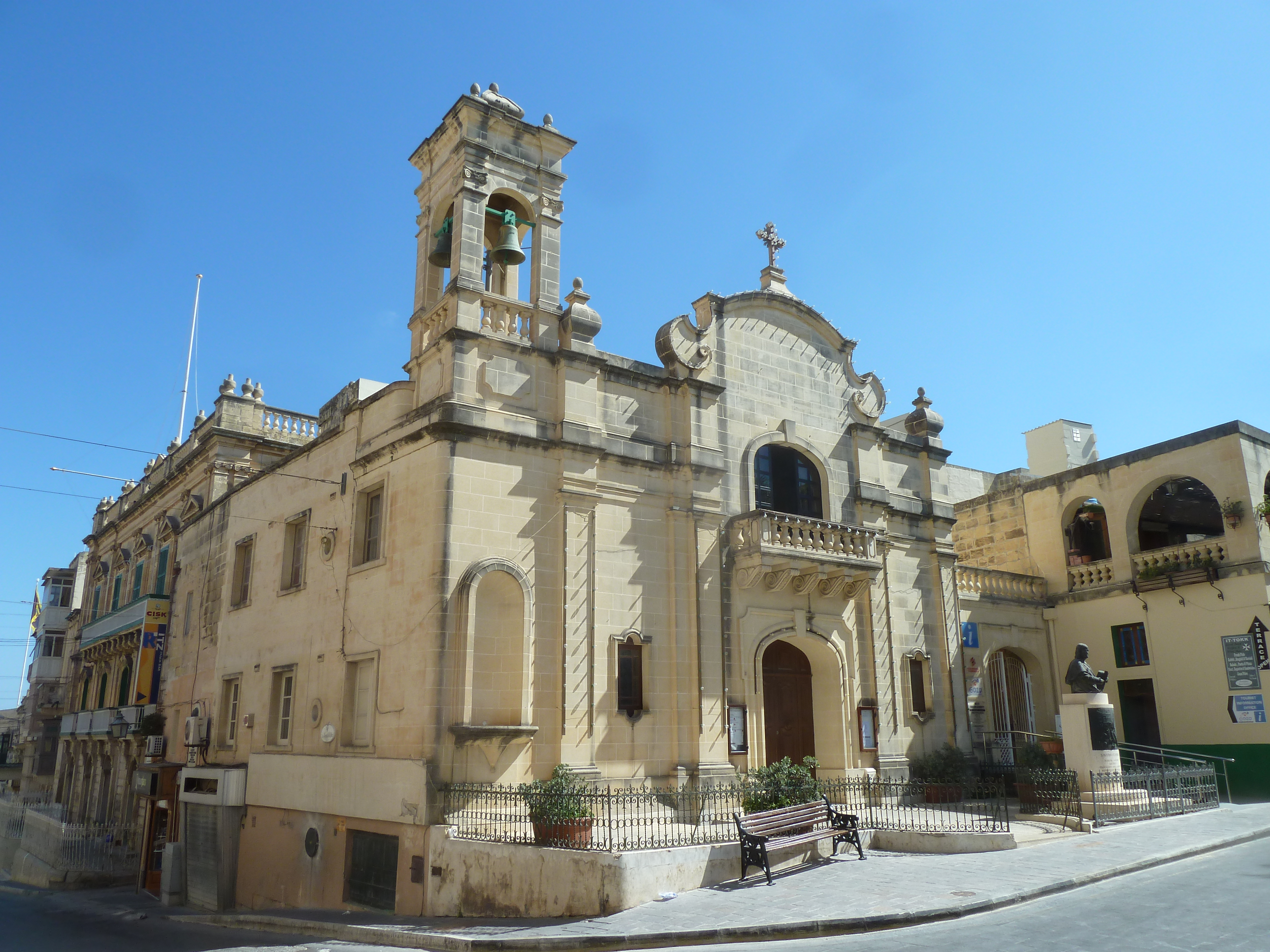
- The church in 2015
- Church of St James the Greater
- 36°2′41.285″N 14°14′22.719″E
- Location: Victoria, Gozo, Malta
- Denomination: Roman Catholic

History
- Status: Church
- Founded: 18th century
- Dedication: Saint James the Greater

Architecture
- Functional status: Active

Administration
- Province: Malta
- Diocese: Gozo

Clergy
- Rector: George Borg

The Church of St James is a Roman Catholic church building in Victoria, Gozo, Malta, situated in Independence Square, the centre of the town.

== History ==
The present church dates from the 20th century but part of the church, particularly the sanctuary, dates to the 18th century. The original building was used as a parochial church for the eastern part of the island of Gozo during the night hours at a time when the only parishes on the island were those of St George and the Collegiate of the Assumption, the present cathedral. Two other chapels were adjoined to the original church, one dedicated to the Holy Cross and the other to St Mark. This is recorded in inquisitor Pietro Dusina's 1575 report.

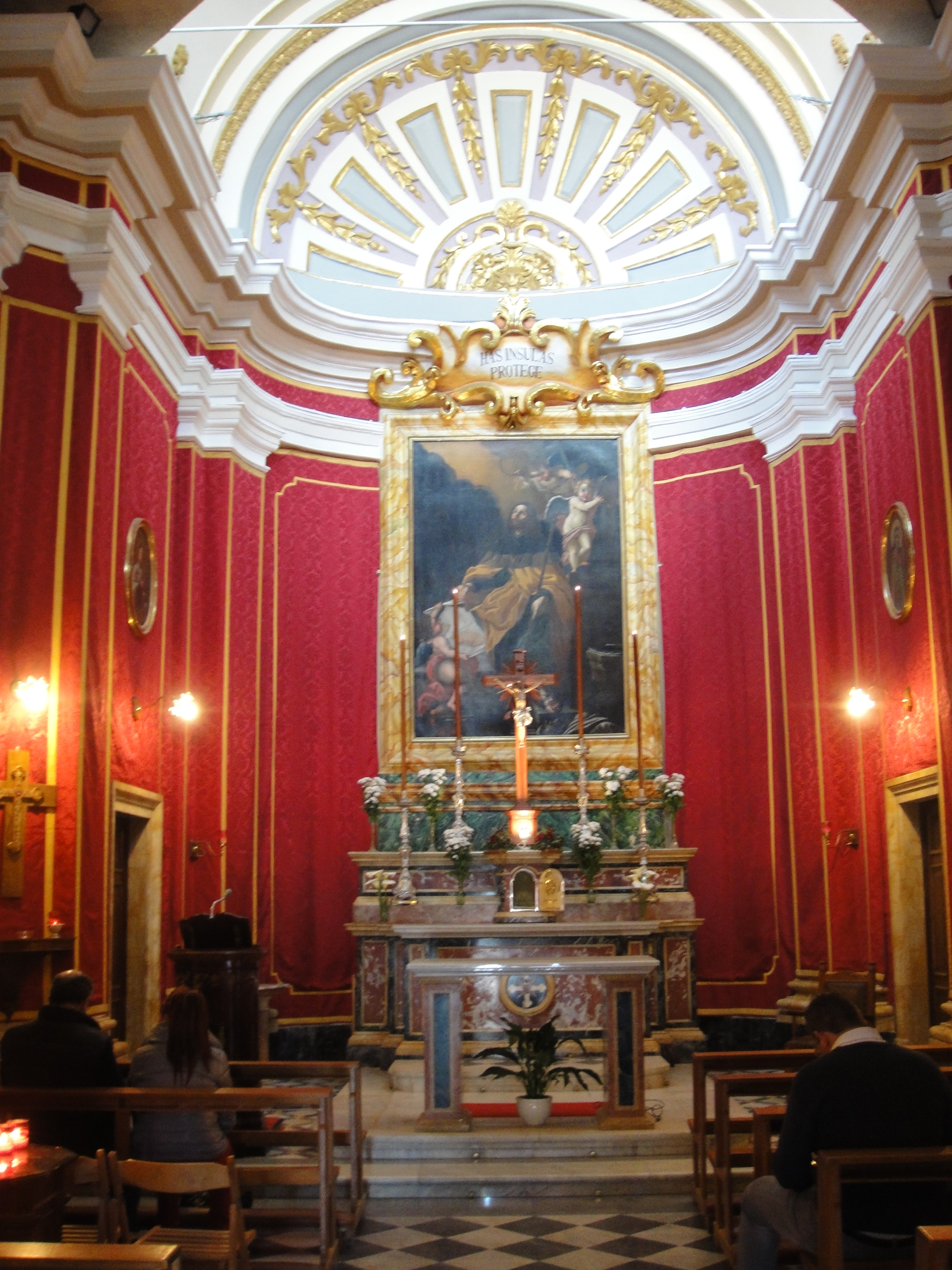
Interior of the church

Following the 1551 corsair raid on Gozo, led by Sinam Baxa, the church suffered extensive damage and had to be rebuilt. It was deconsecrated in 1657 by Bishop Balaguer and a new church was built in its place by order of Grand Master Ramon Despuig. It was finished in 1740. The church was used for the blessing of the crops on the feast of St Mark. This custom started in 1847 and ended in 1968. The church was consecrated on January 18, 1942. It was partly demolished in 1979 because of damage to the structure, and had to be rebuilt.

The church building is listed on the National Inventory of the Cultural Property of the Maltese Islands.

== Works of art ==
The altarpiece, depicting St James, dates back to 1742. There are two side altars, one dedicated to St Barbara and the other to St Teresa of Avila and St Rose of Lima. The paintings are said to have been painted by Francesco Zahra. The church is most famous for the statue of Our Lady of Sorrow which is taken out of the church on the Friday before Good Friday and taken into procession around the streets of Victoria. The statue was brought from Munich in 1879.

== See also ==
- Culture of Malta
- History of Malta – Maltese history
- List of Churches in Malta
- Religion in Malta
