= Ghadir =

Ghadir or Ghadeer (Arabic: غدير) means moving body/object or small stream/river in Arabic. It may refer to:

== Places ==
- El Ghedir, a village in Skikda Province, Algeria
- Ghadir, a village in Keserwan District, Lebanon
- Ghadir-e Sab, a village in Khuzestan Province, Iran
- Ghadir Kuhi, a village in Hormozgan Province, Iran
- Ghadir Saberi, a village in Hormozgan Province, Iran
- Qaleh-ye Ghadir, a village in Khuzestan Province, Iran
- Shahrak-e Ghadir, a village in Fars Province, Iran
- Ghadir Bridge, a bridge in Esfahan city over the Zayandeh River, Iran
- Ghadir Khumm, the location of Event of Ghadir Khumm, a sacred site in Saudi Arabia
- A former village in Aden, now Yemen
- Għadira, a nature reserve in Mellieħa, Malta
- Font Għadir, a beach in Sliema, Malta

== People ==
=== Given name ===
- Ghadeer Aseeri (born 1977), Kuwaiti politician
- Ghadir Ghroof-Gharid (born 1990), Palestinian track and field athlete
- Ghadir Razuki, British-Iraqi businessman
- Ghadir Shafie, Arab Israeli activist

=== Surname ===
- Ali Ghadeer (born 1971), Iraqi writer and journalist
- Mohammad Ghadir (born 1991), Israeli Arab footballer

== Other uses ==
- Ghadir (missile), an Iranian anti-ship cruise missile
- Ghadir (submarine), a class of midget submarines built by Iran
- Ghadir River, a river in Lebanon
- Al-Ghadir, a book by Iranian Shia scholar Abd Al Husayn Amini
- Eid al-Ghadeer, a festival commemorating Muhammad's last sermon
- Event of Ghadir Khumm, where Muhammad announced Ali as his successor

== See also ==
- Kader (disambiguation)
- Kadir
