= Kadr =

Kadr may refer to:

- Ahmed bin Kadr Labed, Algerian Guantanamo Bay detainee
- KADR, radio station licensed to serve the community of Elkader, Iowa
- KADR (studio), Polish film studio established in 1955
- Talib Abdul Kadr

== See also ==
- Qadr (disambiguation)
- Kader (disambiguation)
- Khadr (disambiguation)
