= Qadr =

Qadr may refer to:

- Birjis Qadr
- Laylat al-Qadr, Islamic festival during Ramadan commemorating the revelation of the Qur'an
- Qadr (munition)
- Qadr (doctrine), of predestination in Islam
- Al-Qadr (sura), chapter of the Qur'an
- Qadr Spooner

== See also ==
- Kadr (disambiguation)
- Kader (disambiguation)
- Khadr (disambiguation)
