= Climate of Malta =

Malta

Climate chart (precipitation, max. and min. temperature)
| J | F | M | A | M | J | J | A | S | O | N | D |
| 99 16 10 | 60 16 9 | 44 17 11 | 21 20 12 | 16 24 16 | 4.6 29 19 | 0.3 32 22 | 13 32 23 | 59 29 21 | 83 25 18 | 92 21 15 | 109 17 12 |
- █ Average max. and min. temperatures in °C
- █ Precipitation totals in mm
- Source: Meteo Climate (1981–2010 data),
Imperial conversion
| J | F | M | A | M | J | J | A | S | O | N | D |
| 3.9 60 50 | 2.4 60 49 | 1.7 63 51 | 0.8 68 54 | 0.6 75 60 | 0.2 83 66 | 0 89 71 | 0.5 89 73 | 2.3 83 69 | 3.3 77 65 | 3.6 69 58 | 4.3 63 53 |
- █ Average max. and min. temperatures in °F
- █ Precipitation totals in inches

Malta has a Subtropical-Mediterranean climate according to the Köppen climate classification (Csa), with very mild winters and warm to hot summers. Rain occurs mainly in winter, with summer being generally dry. According to the Troll-Paffen climate classification and the Siegmund/Frankenberg climate classification, Malta lies within the subtropical zone, being at 35ºN latitude.

== Temperature ==
The average yearly temperature is around 23 °C (73 °F) during the day and 16 °C (61 °F) at night (one of the warmest temperature averages in Europe). In the coldest month – January – the typical maximum temperature ranges from 12 to 20 °C (54 to 68 °F) during the day and the minimum from 6 to 12 °C (43 to 54 °F) at night. In the warmest month – August – the typical maximum temperature ranges from 28 to 34 °C (82 to 93 °F) during the day and the minimum from 20 to 24 °C (68 to 75 °F) at night.

Generally, April starts with temperatures from 17–22 °C (63–72 °F) during the day and 10–14 °C (50–57 °F) at night. November has temperatures from 17–23 °C (63–73 °F) during the day and 11–18 °C (52–64 °F) at night. However even in the winter months of the year (December, January, February) temperatures sometimes reach 20 °C (68 °F), March is transitional, with warmer temperatures, daily maximums often exceed 20 °C (68 °F) and lows are already in the 2 digits (above 10 °C (50 °F)) since early March. With an average of 19.3 °C (67 °F), Malta has the warmest average temperature in Europe. Amongst all capitals in the continent of Europe, Valletta – the capital of Malta has the warmest winters, with average temperatures of around 16 °C (61 °F) during the day and 10 °C (50 °F) at night in the months of January and February. In March and December average temperatures are around 17 °C (63 °F) during the day and 11 °C (52 °F) at night. In Malta, large fluctuations in temperature are rare. Malta is one of only a handful of locations in Europe with a USDA hardiness zone of 11a, that is the average absolute minimum temperature recorded each year is between 4.4 to 7.2 °C (39.9 to 45.0 °F).

== Daylight ==
Malta enjoys one of the most optimal arrangement of hours of daylight in Europe. Days in winter are not as short as in the northern part of the continent, the average hours of daylight in December, January and February is 10.3 hours (for comparison: London or Moscow or Warsaw – about 8 hours). The shortest day of the year – 21 December – sunrise is around 7:00 and sunset is around 17:00. The longest day of the year – 21 June – sunrise is around 5:30 and sunset is around 20:30.

Average hours of daylight
| Hours | Jan | Feb | Mar | Apr | May | Jun | Jul | Aug | Sep | Oct | Nov | Dec |
|---|---|---|---|---|---|---|---|---|---|---|---|---|
| Day | 10 | 10.8 | 11.9 | 13 | 14 | 14.5 | 14.3 | 13.5 | 12.3 | 11.2 | 10.2 | 9.8 |
| Twilight/Night | 14 | 13.2 | 12.1 | 11 | 10 | 9.5 | 9.7 | 10.5 | 11.7 | 12.8 | 13.8 | 14.2 |

== Sunshine ==
As a consequence of Malta's high daylight hours, Malta experiences around 3,000 hours of sunshine per year (also one of the highest in Europe), from an average of above 5 hours of sunshine per day in December to an average of above 12 hours of sunshine per day in July. Thus, Malta has about twice the amount of sunshine as cities in the northern half of Europe. For comparison, London has 1,461 hours per year; in addition, in winter Malta has much more sunshine. For comparison, London has 37 hours while Malta has 161 hours of sunshine in December.

Climate data for Malta
| Month | Jan | Feb | Mar | Apr | May | Jun | Jul | Aug | Sep | Oct | Nov | Dec | Year |
|---|---|---|---|---|---|---|---|---|---|---|---|---|---|
| Mean monthly sunshine hours | 169.3 | 178.1 | 227.2 | 253.8 | 309.7 | 336.9 | 376.7 | 352.2 | 270.0 | 223.8 | 195.0 | 161.2 | 3,054 |
| Mean daily sunshine hours | 5.46 | 6.36 | 7.33 | 8.46 | 9.99 | 11.23 | 12.15 | 11.36 | 9.00 | 7.22 | 6.50 | 5.20 | 8.4 |
| Percentage possible sunshine | 58 | 62 | 64 | 67 | 72 | 81 | 87 | 88 | 77 | 65 | 62 | 55 | 70 |
Source: MaltaWeather (Mean daily and monthly sunshine hours), climatemps.com (Percent possible sunshine)

== Sea temperature ==
Average annual temperature of sea is 20 °C (68 °F) (the highest annual sea temperature in Europe), from 15–16 °C (59–61 °F) in the period from January to April to 26 °C (79 °F) in August. In the 6 months from June to November, the average sea temperature exceeds 20 °C (68 °F). In May and December – the transition months – the average is around 18 °C (64 °F).

In the second half of April, which is the beginning of the summer/holiday season the average sea temperature is 17 °C (63 °F). The highest sea temperature is 27 °C (81 °F) in the middle-3rd week of August. In late August and early September the temperature drops to 26 °C (79 °F), and in the second half of September it drops to 25 °C (77 °F). Around mid-October it drops to 24 °C (75 °F), and during the last week of October it drops to 23 °C (73 °F). By early November the temperature drops to 22 °C (72 °F) (data of 2010).

Average sea temperature according to MaltaWeather.com
| Jan | Feb | Mar | Apr | May | Jun | Jul | Aug | Sep | Oct | Nov | Dec | Year |
|---|---|---|---|---|---|---|---|---|---|---|---|---|
| 15.4 °C (59.7 °F) | 14.9 °C (58.8 °F) | 15.0 °C (59.0 °F) | 15.9 °C (60.6 °F) | 17.5 °C (63.5 °F) | 21.1 °C (70.0 °F) | 24.1 °C (75.4 °F) | 25.8 °C (78.4 °F) | 25.2 °C (77.4 °F) | 23.2 °C (73.8 °F) | 20.6 °C (69.1 °F) | 17.4 °C (63.3 °F) | 20 °C (68 °F) |

Average sea temperature according to seatemperature.org
| Jan | Feb | Mar | Apr | May | Jun | Jul | Aug | Sep | Oct | Nov | Dec | Year |
|---|---|---|---|---|---|---|---|---|---|---|---|---|
| 16.1 °C (61.0 °F) | 15.4 °C (59.7 °F) | 15.4 °C (59.7 °F) | 16.3 °C (61.3 °F) | 18.7 °C (65.7 °F) | 22.6 °C (72.7 °F) | 25.5 °C (77.9 °F) | 26.1 °C (79.0 °F) | 25.5 °C (77.9 °F) | 23.4 °C (74.1 °F) | 21.2 °C (70.2 °F) | 18.1 °C (64.6 °F) | 20 °C (68 °F) |

Average sea temperature according to weather2travel.com
| Jan | Feb | Mar | Apr | May | Jun | Jul | Aug | Sep | Oct | Nov | Dec | Year |
|---|---|---|---|---|---|---|---|---|---|---|---|---|
| 16 °C (61 °F) | 16 °C (61 °F) | 16 °C (61 °F) | 16 °C (61 °F) | 18 °C (64 °F) | 21 °C (70 °F) | 24 °C (75 °F) | 26 °C (79 °F) | 25 °C (77 °F) | 23 °C (73 °F) | 21 °C (70 °F) | 18 °C (64 °F) | 20 °C (68 °F) |

== Precipitation ==
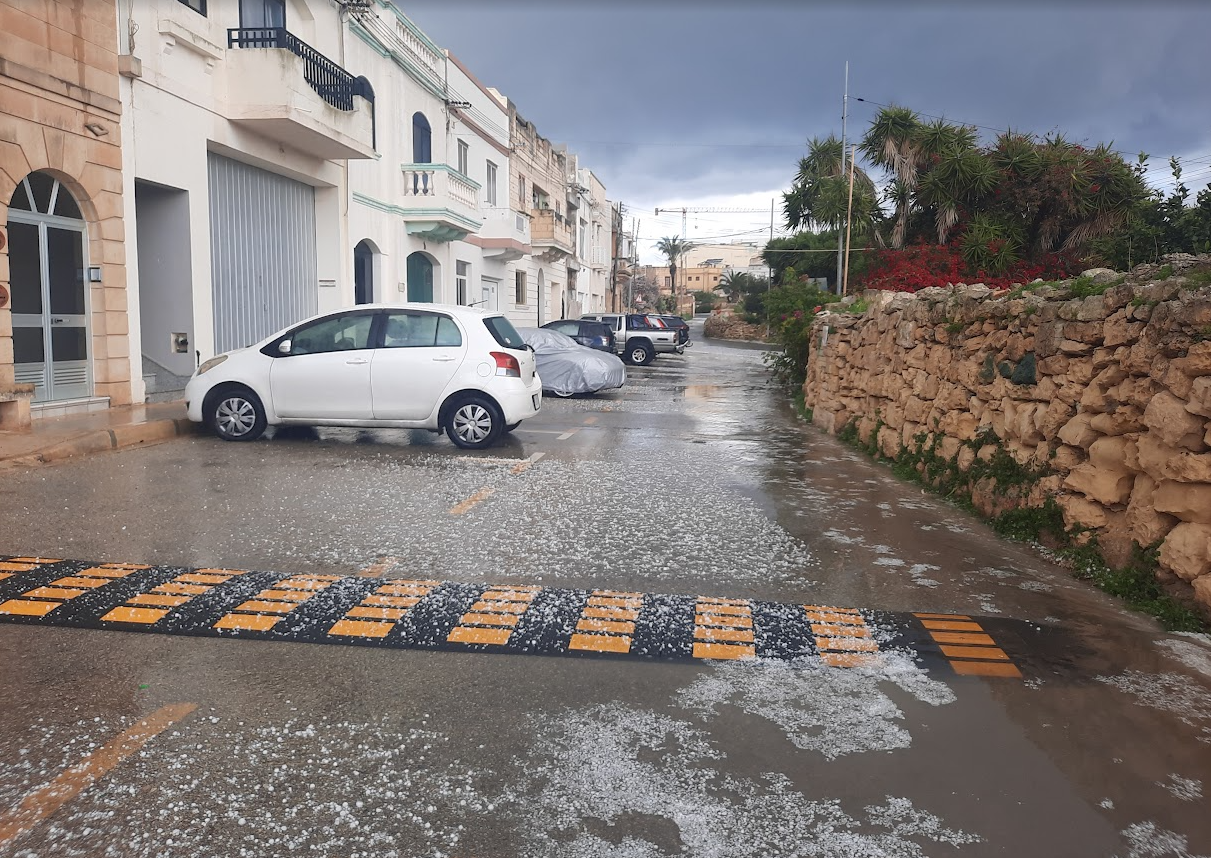
Malta after a hailstorm

Water supply poses a problem on Malta, as the summer is both rainless and the time of greatest water use, and the winter rainfall often falls as heavy showers running off to the sea rather than soaking into the ground. Malta depends on underground reserves of fresh water, drawn through a system of water tunnels such as the Ta' Kandja galleries or the Ta' Bakkja tunnels, which average about 97 m below surface and extend like the spokes of a wheel. In the galleries in Malta's porous limestone, fresh water lies in a lens upon brine. More than half the potable water of Malta is produced by desalination, which creates further issues of fossil fuel use and pollution.

Malta has an average of 90 precipitation days a year, and experiences from a few to a dozen rainy days per month (≥ 1 mm), ranging from 0.5 of a day in July to around 15 in December. The average annual precipitation is around 600 mm, ranging from ≈0.3 mm in July to ≈110 mm in December.

Climate data for Malta (Balzan in the central part of the island)
| Month | Jan | Feb | Mar | Apr | May | Jun | Jul | Aug | Sep | Oct | Nov | Dec | Year |
|---|---|---|---|---|---|---|---|---|---|---|---|---|---|
| Average precipitation mm (inches) | 94.7 (3.73) | 63.4 (2.50) | 37.0 (1.46) | 26.3 (1.04) | 9.2 (0.36) | 5.4 (0.21) | 0.2 (0.01) | 6.0 (0.24) | 67.4 (2.65) | 77.2 (3.04) | 108.6 (4.28) | 107.7 (4.24) | 603.1 (23.74) |
| Average precipitation days (≥ 0.1 mm) | 15 | 12 | 9 | 6 | 3 | 1 | 0 | 1 | 5 | 9 | 13 | 16 | 90 |
Source: MaltaWeather.com

Climate data for Malta
| Month | Jan | Feb | Mar | Apr | May | Jun | Jul | Aug | Sep | Oct | Nov | Dec | Year |
|---|---|---|---|---|---|---|---|---|---|---|---|---|---|
| Average precipitation mm (inches) | 89.0 (3.50) | 61.3 (2.41) | 40.9 (1.61) | 22.5 (0.89) | 6.6 (0.26) | 3.2 (0.13) | 0.4 (0.02) | 7.0 (0.28) | 40.4 (1.59) | 89.7 (3.53) | 80.0 (3.15) | 112.3 (4.42) | 553.3 (21.78) |
| Average precipitation days (≥ 0.1 mm) | 13.7 | 10.9 | 8.9 | 6.4 | 2.8 | 1.1 | 0.4 | 1.0 | 3.9 | 10.2 | 10.6 | 14.2 | 84.1 |
Source: World Meteorological Organization

== Humidity ==
The annual average relative humidity is high, averaging 76%, ranging from 69% in July (morning: 78% evening: 53%) to 79% in December (morning: 83% evening: 73%).

Climate data for Luqa
| Month | Jan | Feb | Mar | Apr | May | Jun | Jul | Aug | Sep | Oct | Nov | Dec | Year |
|---|---|---|---|---|---|---|---|---|---|---|---|---|---|
| Average relative humidity (%) | 79 | 79 | 79 | 77 | 74 | 71 | 69 | 73 | 77 | 78 | 77 | 79 | 76 |
Source: NOAA

== Records ==
Despite the relative stasis of the Maltese climate, historical records present some variations. In the capital city of Valletta, meteorological officials of the time recorded a temperature of 1.2 °C (34.2 °F) on 19 February 1895, which remains a record for the city.

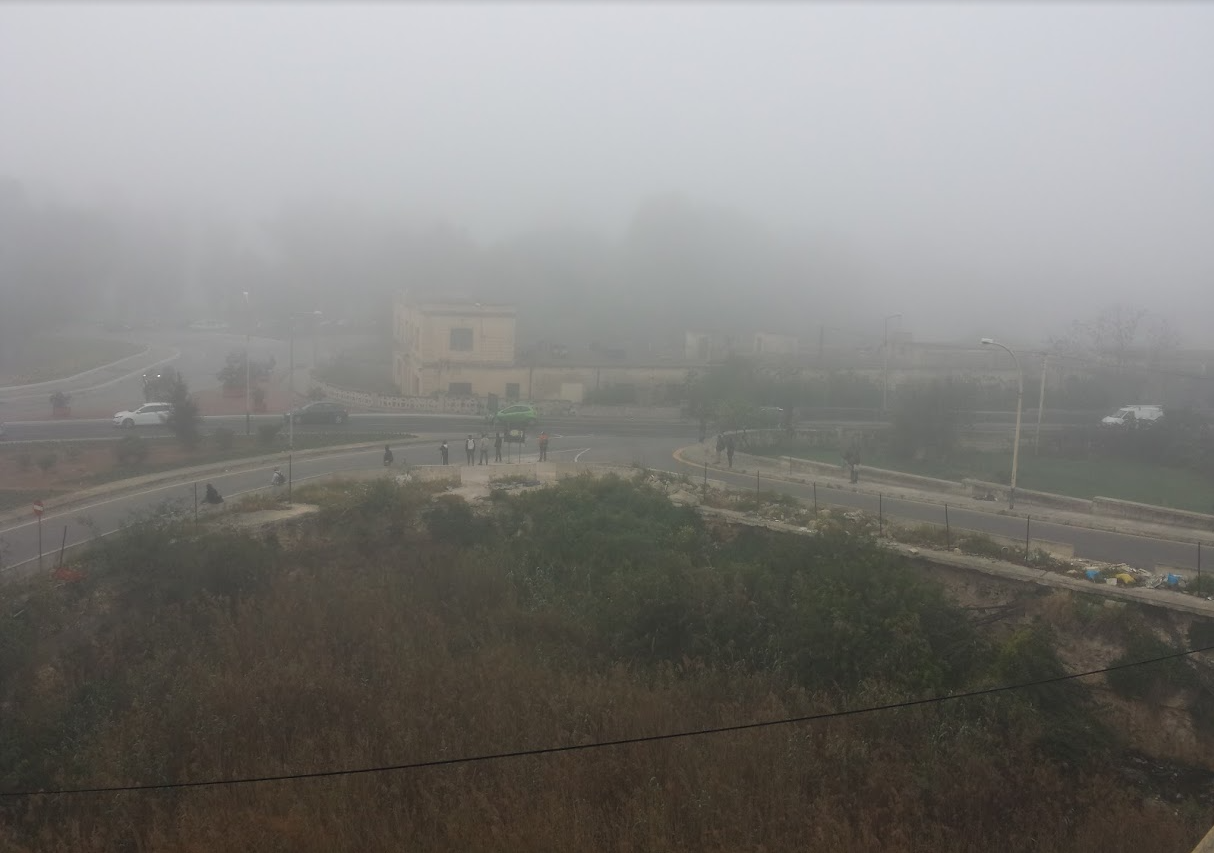
One of The Foggiest Days in Malta in 2016

Regarding the island as a whole, a temperature of −1.7 °C (28.9 °F) was recorded on 1 February 1962, at Ta' Qali airfield, in the centre of the island, which was accompanied by frozen precipitation (hail), though this temperature is not recognised by the Malta Met Office as it was not an official recording station and didn't use worldwide meteorological standard instruments.

Snow is a very rare phenomenon, there was a snowfall reported in January 1858, March 1877 (light snow without accumulation), February 1895 (snow without accumulation), January 1905 (flurries without accumulation), March 1949 (snow recorded in the interior of the island), and 31 January 1962, On 31 December 2014 snow was reported at various locations. though the Met Office later confirmed this was actually Graupel or soft hail. It is thought that many historical reports of "snowfall" were likely also Graupel. That Winter went on to be one of the coldest and stormiest ever experienced in the Maltese Islands. On the early morning of January 17th 2026 specifically in Rabat, Malta, a sudden and intense storm swept across parts of Malta that released heavy bursts of hail with ice pellets falling rapidly and loudly. What many initially thought was snow was in fact a powerful and unusual hailstorm. Even in winter months, such ice accumulation is highly unusual in Malta's typical Mediterranean climate. Within a short time, streets, rooftops and fields became covered in a thick white layer and the ground looked almost identical to snow covered landscapes. About 1 in 900 to 1 in 1800 of a rough chance of happening in Malta. A similar event occurred back in December 2014.

The lowest temperature ever recorded at Luqa International Airport was in January 1981, with 1.4 °C (34.5 °F), and the highest temperature was 43.8 °C (110.8 °F) recorded on 9 August 1999.

June 2021 recorded a very rare type of heatwave. For 12 straight days lasting from 20 June until 1 July, maximum temperature exceeded the climate average maximum by more than 5.0 °C (9.0 °F) and it was only due to the turning of the month that the heatwave ceased to be classified as a heatwave. The record maximum temperature was beaten 3 times during that heatwave – on the 24th with 40.2 °C (104.4 °F), the 25th with 41.3 °C (106.3 °F) and on the 30th with 41.5 °C (106.7 °F).

Climate data for Malta
| Month | Jan | Feb | Mar | Apr | May | Jun | Jul | Aug | Sep | Oct | Nov | Dec | Year |
|---|---|---|---|---|---|---|---|---|---|---|---|---|---|
| Record high °C (°F) | 25.8 (78.4) | 26.7 (80.1) | 33.5 (92.3) | 30.7 (87.3) | 35.3 (95.5) | 41.5 (106.7) | 43.3 (109.9) | 43.8 (110.8) | 37.4 (99.3) | 34.5 (94.1) | 28.2 (82.8) | 24.3 (75.7) | 43.8 (110.8) |
| Record low °C (°F) | 1.4 (34.5) | 1.7 (35.1) | 2.2 (36.0) | 4.4 (39.9) | 8.0 (46.4) | 12.6 (54.7) | 15.5 (59.9) | 15.9 (60.6) | 13.2 (55.8) | 8.0 (46.4) | 5.0 (41.0) | 3.6 (38.5) | 1.4 (34.5) |
Source 1: Malta Airport Meteorological Office (extremes 1947–2010)
Source 2: https://www.independent.com.mt/articles/2022-01-19/local-news/2021-was-a-year-of-meteorological-records-6736239923

Climate data for Malta (Balzan in the central part of the island. 1985–2017)
| Month | Jan | Feb | Mar | Apr | May | Jun | Jul | Aug | Sep | Oct | Nov | Dec | Year |
|---|---|---|---|---|---|---|---|---|---|---|---|---|---|
| Record high °C (°F) | 26.3 (79.3) | 24.1 (75.4) | 33.5 (92.3) | 31.7 (89.1) | 37.3 (99.1) | 40.1 (104.2) | 43.1 (109.6) | 43.0 (109.4) | 39.2 (102.6) | 33.5 (92.3) | 28.9 (84.0) | 24.9 (76.8) | 43.1 (109.6) |
| Record low °C (°F) | 3.9 (39.0) | 2.6 (36.7) | 4.8 (40.6) | 6.5 (43.7) | 10.5 (50.9) | 14.7 (58.5) | 17.4 (63.3) | 18.0 (64.4) | 15.4 (59.7) | 11.3 (52.3) | 5.7 (42.3) | 3.6 (38.5) | 2.6 (36.7) |
Source: MaltaWeather.com

== Climate data ==
Climate data for Malta (Balzan in the central part of main island, since 1985)
| Month | Jan | Feb | Mar | Apr | May | Jun | Jul | Aug | Sep | Oct | Nov | Dec | Year |
|---|---|---|---|---|---|---|---|---|---|---|---|---|---|
| Mean daily maximum °C (°F) | 16.1 (61.0) | 16.0 (60.8) | 17.8 (64.0) | 20.0 (68.0) | 24.2 (75.6) | 28.5 (83.3) | 31.5 (88.7) | 31.8 (89.2) | 28.4 (83.1) | 25.2 (77.4) | 21.0 (69.8) | 17.5 (63.5) | 23.2 (73.8) |
| Daily mean °C (°F) | 13.2 (55.8) | 13.0 (55.4) | 14.6 (58.3) | 16.7 (62.1) | 20.4 (68.7) | 24.4 (75.9) | 27.2 (81.0) | 27.7 (81.9) | 25.0 (77.0) | 21.9 (71.4) | 18.0 (64.4) | 14.7 (58.5) | 19.7 (67.5) |
| Mean daily minimum °C (°F) | 10.3 (50.5) | 9.9 (49.8) | 11.3 (52.3) | 13.3 (55.9) | 16.6 (61.9) | 20.3 (68.5) | 22.8 (73.0) | 23.6 (74.5) | 21.6 (70.9) | 18.6 (65.5) | 15.0 (59.0) | 11.9 (53.4) | 16.3 (61.3) |
| Average precipitation mm (inches) | 94.7 (3.73) | 63.4 (2.50) | 37.0 (1.46) | 26.3 (1.04) | 9.2 (0.36) | 5.4 (0.21) | 0.2 (0.01) | 6.0 (0.24) | 67.4 (2.65) | 77.2 (3.04) | 108.6 (4.28) | 107.7 (4.24) | 603.1 (23.74) |
| Average precipitation days | 15 | 12 | 9 | 6 | 3 | 1 | 0 | 1 | 5 | 9 | 13 | 16 | 90 |
Source: MaltaWeather.com

Climate data for Malta (Luqa in the south-east part of main island, 1991–2020)
| Month | Jan | Feb | Mar | Apr | May | Jun | Jul | Aug | Sep | Oct | Nov | Dec | Year |
|---|---|---|---|---|---|---|---|---|---|---|---|---|---|
| Mean daily maximum °C (°F) | 15.7 (60.3) | 15.7 (60.3) | 17.4 (63.3) | 20.0 (68.0) | 24.2 (75.6) | 28.7 (83.7) | 31.7 (89.1) | 32.0 (89.6) | 28.6 (83.5) | 25.0 (77.0) | 20.8 (69.4) | 17.2 (63.0) | 23.1 (73.6) |
| Daily mean °C (°F) | 12.9 (55.2) | 12.6 (54.7) | 14.1 (57.4) | 16.4 (61.5) | 20.1 (68.2) | 24.2 (75.6) | 26.9 (80.4) | 27.5 (81.5) | 24.9 (76.8) | 21.8 (71.2) | 17.9 (64.2) | 14.5 (58.1) | 19.5 (67.1) |
| Mean daily minimum °C (°F) | 10.1 (50.2) | 9.5 (49.1) | 10.9 (51.6) | 12.8 (55.0) | 15.8 (60.4) | 19.6 (67.3) | 22.1 (71.8) | 23.0 (73.4) | 21.2 (70.2) | 18.4 (65.1) | 14.9 (58.8) | 11.8 (53.2) | 15.9 (60.6) |
| Average precipitation mm (inches) | 79.3 (3.12) | 73.2 (2.88) | 45.3 (1.78) | 20.7 (0.81) | 11.0 (0.43) | 6.2 (0.24) | 0.2 (0.01) | 17.0 (0.67) | 60.7 (2.39) | 81.8 (3.22) | 91.0 (3.58) | 93.7 (3.69) | 580.7 (22.86) |
| Average precipitation days (≥ 1.0 mm) | 10.0 | 8.2 | 6.1 | 3.8 | 1.5 | 0.8 | 0.0 | 1.0 | 4.3 | 6.6 | 8.7 | 10.0 | 61 |
| Mean monthly sunshine hours | 169.3 | 178.1 | 227.2 | 253.8 | 309.7 | 336.9 | 376.7 | 352.2 | 270.0 | 223.8 | 195.0 | 161.2 | 3,054 |
Source: Meteo Climate (1991–2020 data), MaltaWeather.com (Sun data)

Climate data for Malta (Luqa in the south-east part of main island, historical data of 1981–2010)
| Month | Jan | Feb | Mar | Apr | May | Jun | Jul | Aug | Sep | Oct | Nov | Dec | Year |
|---|---|---|---|---|---|---|---|---|---|---|---|---|---|
| Mean daily maximum °C (°F) | 15.6 (60.1) | 15.6 (60.1) | 17.3 (63.1) | 19.8 (67.6) | 24.1 (75.4) | 28.6 (83.5) | 31.5 (88.7) | 31.8 (89.2) | 28.5 (83.3) | 25.0 (77.0) | 20.7 (69.3) | 17.1 (62.8) | 23.0 (73.4) |
| Daily mean °C (°F) | 12.8 (55.0) | 12.5 (54.5) | 13.9 (57.0) | 16.1 (61.0) | 19.8 (67.6) | 23.9 (75.0) | 26.6 (79.9) | 27.2 (81.0) | 24.7 (76.5) | 21.5 (70.7) | 17.7 (63.9) | 14.4 (57.9) | 19.3 (66.7) |
| Mean daily minimum °C (°F) | 9.9 (49.8) | 9.4 (48.9) | 10.6 (51.1) | 12.4 (54.3) | 15.5 (59.9) | 19.1 (66.4) | 21.7 (71.1) | 22.6 (72.7) | 20.8 (69.4) | 18.1 (64.6) | 14.6 (58.3) | 11.6 (52.9) | 15.5 (59.9) |
| Average precipitation mm (inches) | 98.5 (3.88) | 60.1 (2.37) | 44.2 (1.74) | 20.7 (0.81) | 16.0 (0.63) | 4.6 (0.18) | 0.3 (0.01) | 12.8 (0.50) | 58.6 (2.31) | 82.9 (3.26) | 92.3 (3.63) | 109.2 (4.30) | 595.8 (23.46) |
| Average precipitation days (≥ 1.0 mm) | 10 | 7 | 5 | 4 | 1 | 1 | 0 | 1 | 4 | 6 | 9 | 10 | 58 |
Source: Meteo Climate (1981–2010 data),

Climate data for Malta (Luqa in the south-east part of main island, historical dada of 1961–1990)
| Month | Jan | Feb | Mar | Apr | May | Jun | Jul | Aug | Sep | Oct | Nov | Dec | Year |
|---|---|---|---|---|---|---|---|---|---|---|---|---|---|
| Mean daily maximum °C (°F) | 15.2 (59.4) | 15.5 (59.9) | 16.7 (62.1) | 19.1 (66.4) | 23.3 (73.9) | 27.5 (81.5) | 30.7 (87.3) | 30.7 (87.3) | 28.0 (82.4) | 24.2 (75.6) | 20.1 (68.2) | 16.7 (62.1) | 22.3 (72.1) |
| Daily mean °C (°F) | 12.2 (54.0) | 12.4 (54.3) | 13.4 (56.1) | 15.5 (59.9) | 19.1 (66.4) | 23.0 (73.4) | 25.9 (78.6) | 26.3 (79.3) | 24.1 (75.4) | 20.7 (69.3) | 17.0 (62.6) | 13.9 (57.0) | 18.6 (65.5) |
| Mean daily minimum °C (°F) | 9.2 (48.6) | 9.3 (48.7) | 10.1 (50.2) | 11.9 (53.4) | 14.9 (58.8) | 18.4 (65.1) | 21.0 (69.8) | 21.8 (71.2) | 20.1 (68.2) | 17.1 (62.8) | 13.9 (57.0) | 11.0 (51.8) | 14.9 (58.8) |
| Average precipitation mm (inches) | 89.0 (3.50) | 61.3 (2.41) | 40.9 (1.61) | 22.5 (0.89) | 6.6 (0.26) | 3.2 (0.13) | 0.4 (0.02) | 7.0 (0.28) | 40.4 (1.59) | 89.7 (3.53) | 80.0 (3.15) | 112.3 (4.42) | 553.3 (21.78) |
| Average precipitation days (≥ 0.1 mm) | 13.7 | 10.9 | 8.9 | 6.4 | 2.8 | 1.1 | 0.4 | 1.0 | 3.9 | 10.2 | 10.6 | 14.2 | 84.1 |
| Average relative humidity (%) | 79 | 79 | 79 | 77 | 74 | 71 | 69 | 73 | 77 | 78 | 77 | 79 | 76 |
| Mean monthly sunshine hours | 159 | 171 | 224 | 247 | 300 | 328 | 365 | 338 | 260 | 221 | 185 | 156 | 2,954 |
Source: World Meteorological Organization, National Statistics Office, Malta (sun data)

== See also ==
- Malta 2021 Stratospheric Balloon, upper-atmosphere weather balloon
