= Kader =

Kader may refer to:

- Kader (film), a 2006 Turkish drama film
- Kader Group, a toy manufacturer of Hong Kong
- Kader Factory for Developed Industries, a defence manufacturer of Egypt

== Given name ==
- Kader Abdolah (born 1954), Iranian-Dutch writer, poet and columnist.
- Kader Amadou (born 1989), Nigerien footballer
- Kader Arif (born 1959), French politician
- Kader Asaad (born 1967), Iraqi Kurdish musician
- Kader Asmal (1934–2011), South African politician
- Kader Attia (born 1970), Algerian-French artist
- Kader Bamba (born 1994), French footballer
- Kader Belarbi (born 1962), French ballet dancer
- Kader Bhayat (1936–2012), Mauritian lawyer and politician
- Kader Bidimbou (born 1996), Congolese footballer
- Kader Camara (born 1982), Guinean footballer
- Kader Çelik (born 2001), Turkish Paralympian goalball player
- Kader Dost (born 2000), Turkish female race walker
- Kader Fall (born 1986), Senegalese footballer
- Kader Firoud (1919–2005), French-Algerian footballer
- Kader Hançar (born 1999), Turkish women's footballer
- Kader İnal (born 1998), Turkish badminton player
- Kader Japonais (born 1979), Algerian singer
- Kader Keïta (born 2000), Ivorian footballer
- Kader Khan (1937–2018), Indian actor, screenwriter, comedian, and film director
- Kader Kohou (born 1998), Ivorian American football player
- Kader Mangane (born 1983), Senegalese footballer
- Kader N'Chobi (born 1995), Ivorian footballer
- Kader Nouni (born 1976), French tennis umpire
- Kader Rahman (1938–2024), Hong Kong field hockey player
- Kader Sevinc, Turkish politician
- Kader Slila (born 1979), Algerian wrestler
- Kader Sylla (born 2002), American professional skateboarder
- Kader, a fictional superintendent of police played by Danny Denzongpa in the 1984 Indian film Dharm Aur Qanoon
- General Qadir, fictional Pakistan Army general in the 2023 Indian film Pathaan, played by Manish Wadhwa
- Kader Bhai or Khader Bhai, a fictional character in Indian films including Kasargod Khader Bhai (1992) and Again Kasargod Khader Bhai (2010)

== Surname ==
- Aron Kader (born 1974), American comedian of Palestinian descent

== See also ==
- Kadir, an Arabic male given name
- Ghadir (disambiguation)
