= Għadira =

Nature reserve in Mellieħa, Malta

- Interactive map of Għadira

Għadira (Maltese: L-Għadira, lit. 'the pond') also known as Għadira Nature Reserve (Maltese: ir-Riserva Naturali tal-Għadira) is a protected area located in the locality of Mellieħa, Malta. It comprises a brackish lake and a salt marsh habitat. Due to Malta's arid climate, permanent inland water areas are rare, making the Għadira wetlands an extremely important habitat for birds and other wildlife. Many of the birds observed here are migratory, stopping to rest before continuing their migration.

From November to May, guided tours of the reserve are available (volunteers from BirdLife Malta). Entry to the reserve is free.

== Etymology ==
The word għadira in Maltese refers to a small body of water, which can be translated as "brook", "pond", or even "lake". It comes from Arabic: غدير, romanized: ḡadīr, which can be translated likewise.

== History ==
The reserve area, initially directly connected to Mellieħa Bay, was used for centuries as a salt pan, falling into decline around the 16th century following the construction of new salt pans in Salina, near St. Paul's Bay; the area was first shown on maps as Saline and then as Saline Vecchie (or Vechie). After this function ceased, the area was gradually covered by earth, appearing as a slight clay depression that was flooded in winter and drained in summer.

Around 1966, plans were made to build a road that would have devastated the natural area, which, thanks to its characteristics, had become a site of great importance for migratory birds. The planned project attracted the attention of the Malta Ornithological Society (MOS), then part of the Natural History Society of Malta, which managed to convince then Prime Minister George Borg Olivier to review the project so that the area could be protected. Over the following year, the MOS also presented a detailed report to Parliament on the naturalistic characteristics of Għadira, calling for the creation of a nature reserve.

Meanwhile, especially during the 1970s, the area became a popular spot for picnics and other outdoor activities, and was even granted government permission for hunting. In 1978, the MOS invited British naturalist Herbert Axell, a former member of the Royal Society for the Protection of Birds, to Malta. He worked to safeguard the site, which was declared a bird sanctuary that same year. Axell was also the main architect of the environmental redevelopment of the area, aiming to create a fully-fledged state nature reserve.

Work began in 1980, thanks to a donation of 25,000 US dollars from the World Wildlife Fund, and the reserve was officially inaugurated in 1988, also winning a diploma of merit awarded by Europa Nostra in 1989. In 1999 the reserve was visited by Prime Minister Eddie Fenech Adami.

== Nature conservation ==
It operates as a nature reserve under the care of BirdLife Malta. The site was designated a bird sanctuary in 1978. Since 1988, Għadira, covering an area of 112 hectares, has been designated a Ramsar site with the number 410, including a Council of Europe Biogenetic Reserve and a Mediterranean Protected Area, without a hunting area. It comprises a saltwater coastal basin (formerly used for salt production) with varying water levels and salinities, surrounded by sand dunes. It is also classified as a Terrestrial Protected Area with an area of 0.11 km², Special Areas of Conservation - International Importance with an area of 0.03 km², Special Protection Area for birds with an area of 0.98 km².

== Flora and fauna ==
The reserve attracts migratory wading birds such as redshanks, snipes, and herons. Coastal pancrats, crithmoides, and sea squirrels can be seen in the hiking trails. In spring, black-winged stilts and little ringed plovers, among others, arrive to breed in the reserve. Chameleons can also be observed in the reserve.

Several rare salt-tolerant plant species can be found here, as well as a variety of invertebrates, including endemic grasshoppers and wasps. The Mediterranean killifish, endangered elsewhere in Malta, is abundant.

== Gallery ==
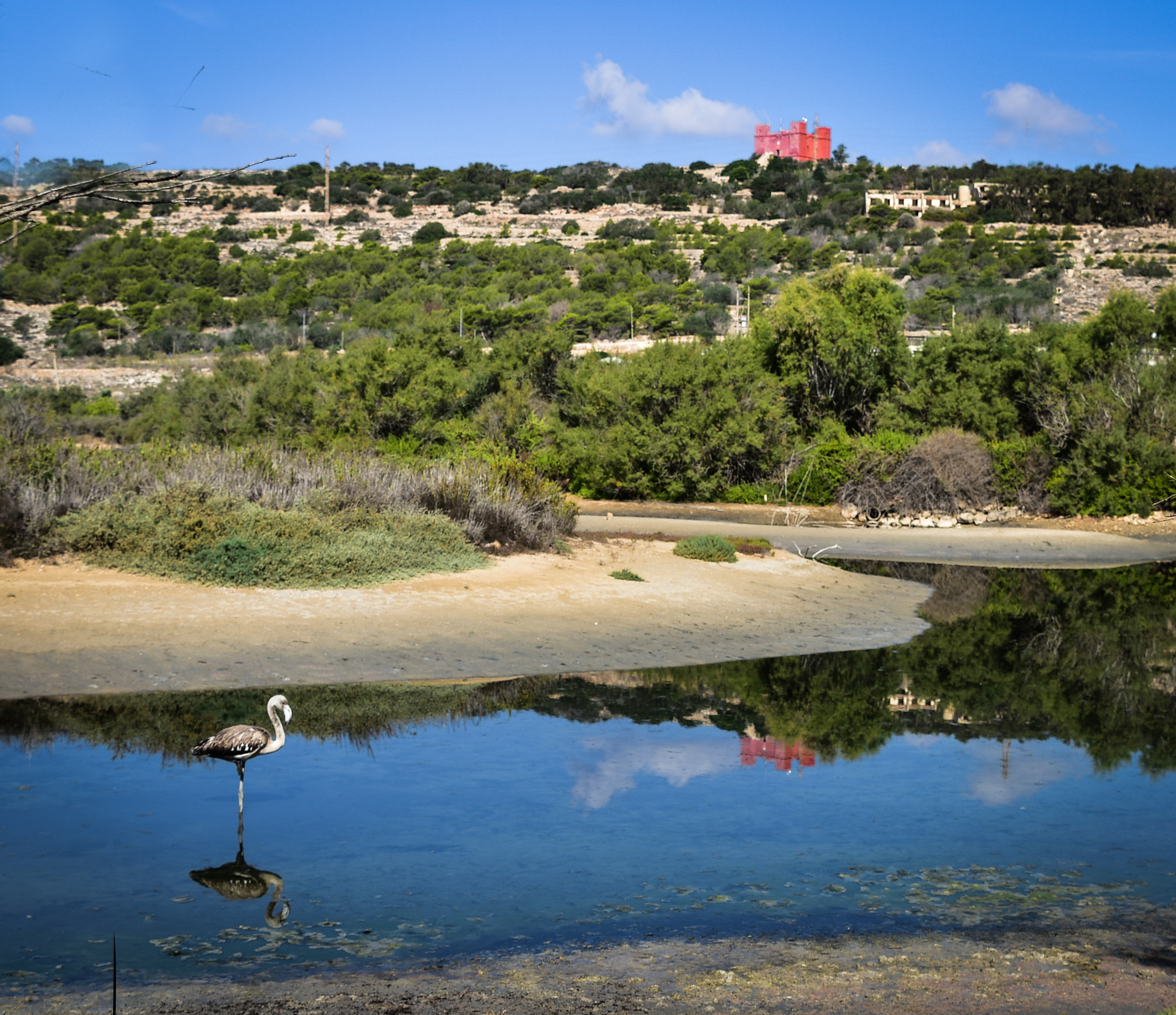
View of the reserve

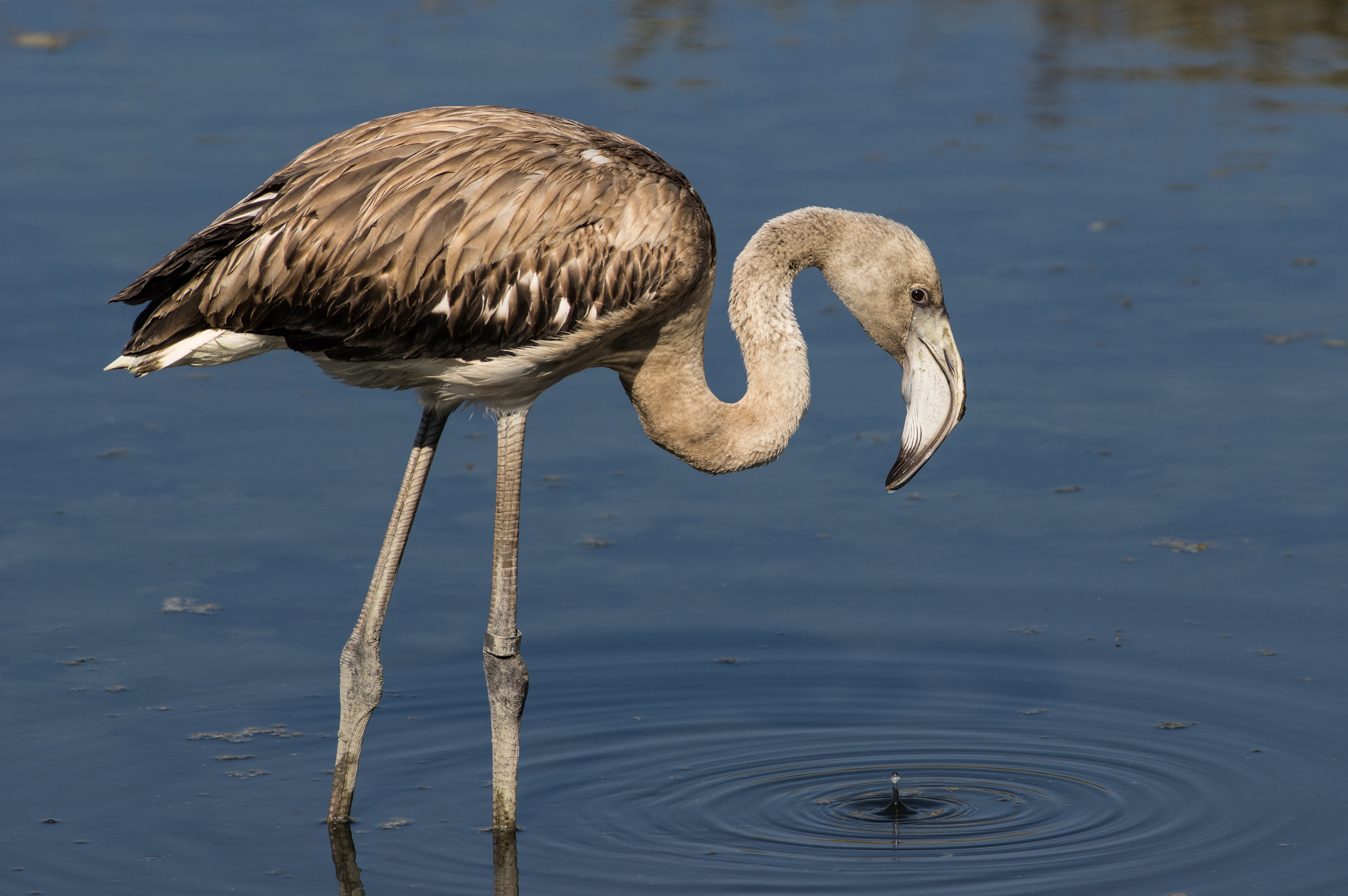
Young greater flamingo

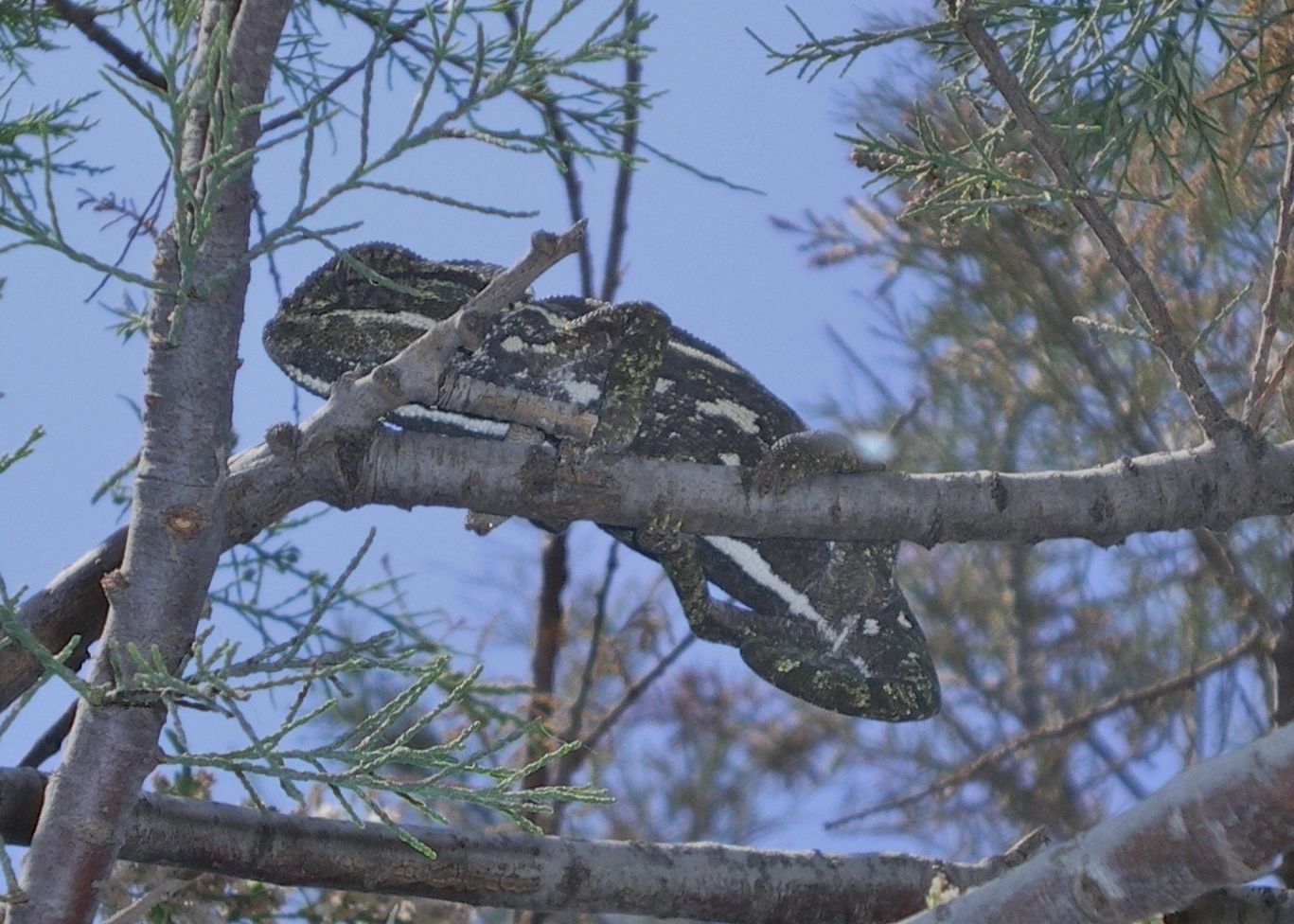
Common chameleon

== See also ==
- Geography of Malta
