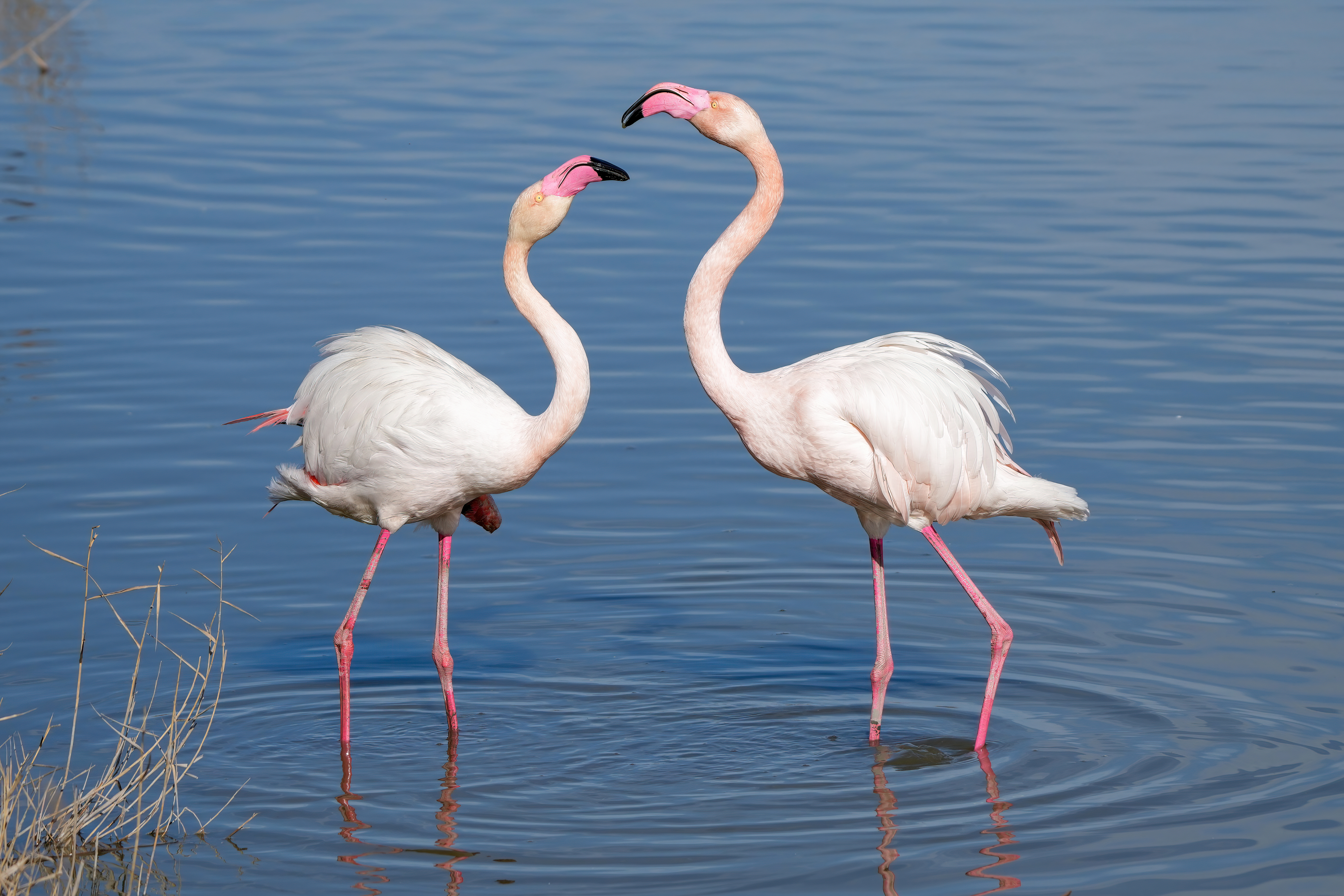
- Male and female in the Camargue
- Vocalization

Conservation status
- Least Concern (IUCN 3.1)
- CITES Appendix II

Scientific classification
- Kingdom: Animalia
- Phylum: Chordata
- Class: Aves
- Order: Phoenicopteriformes
- Family: Phoenicopteridae
- Genus: Phoenicopterus
- Species: P. roseus

Binomial name
- Phoenicopterus roseus Pallas, 1811
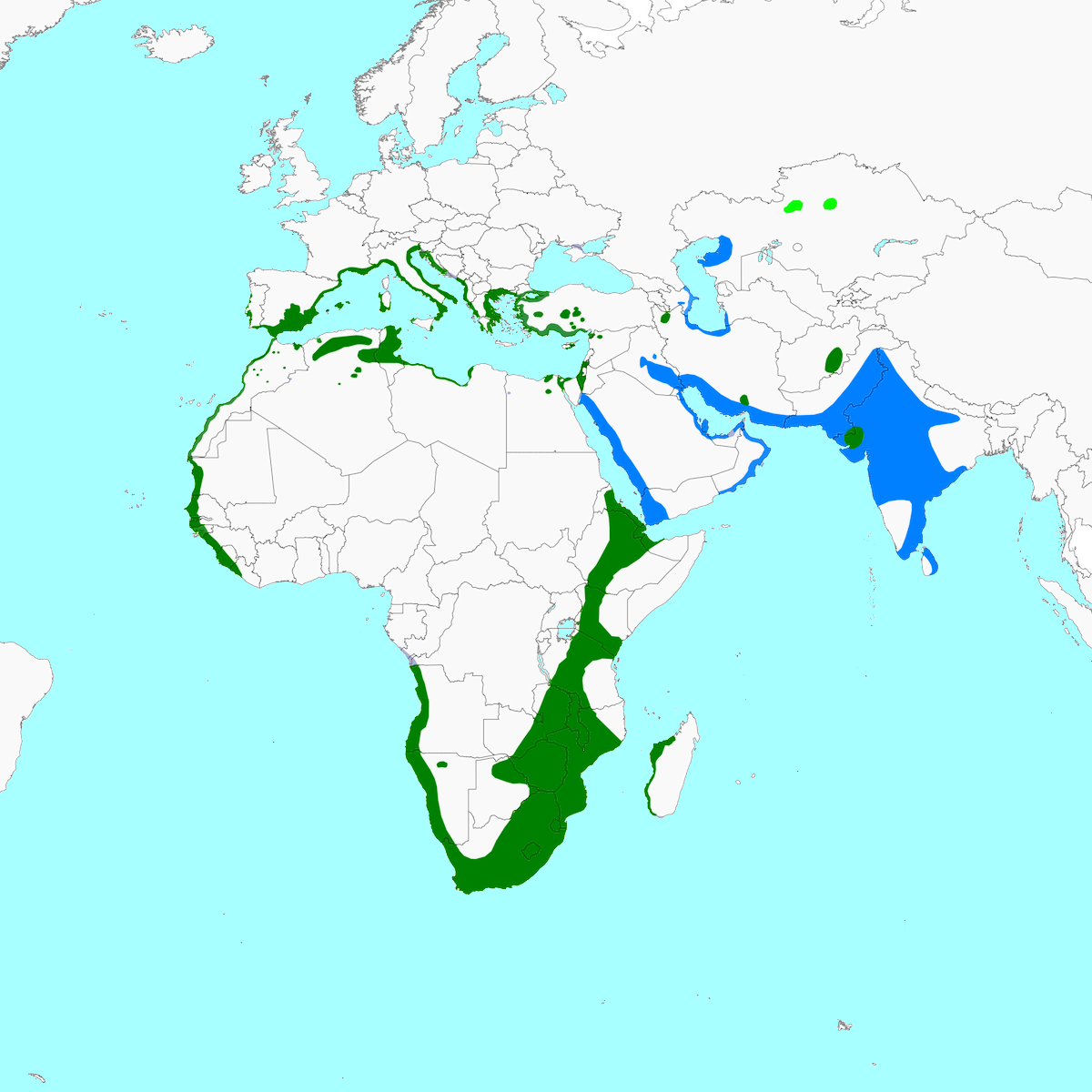
- Range of Phoenicopterus roseus Breeding summer visitor Breeding resident Non-breeding

Synonyms
- Phoenicopterus ruber roseus; Phoenicopterus antiquorum

= Greater flamingo =

Species of bird

The greater flamingo (Phoenicopterus roseus) is the largest and most widespread flamingo species. Common in the Old World, they are found in Northern (coastal) and Sub-Saharan Africa, the Indian subcontinent (south of the Himalayas), Central Asia, the Middle East, the Levant, the Persian Gulf, the Gulf of Aden, the Red Sea, and the Mediterranean countries of Southern Europe.

== Taxonomy ==
The greater flamingo was described by Peter Simon Pallas in 1811. It was previously thought to be the same species as the American flamingo (Phoenicopterus ruber), but because of colouring differences of its head, neck, body, and bill, these two flamingos are now considered separate species. The greater flamingo is monotypic, with no subspecies.

== Distribution ==
It is found in parts of Northern Africa (including coastal areas of northern Algeria, Egypt further inland along the Nile River and Lake Qarun near Faiyum, Libya, Morocco, and Tunisia), portions of Sub-Saharan Africa (Kenya, Madagascar, Rwanda, Tanzania, Uganda), Southern Asia (coastal Bangladesh, India, Pakistan, and Sri Lanka), the Western Asia (Cyprus, coasts of the Persian Gulf, Levant including Palestine region, Oman) and Southern Europe (including Albania, Bulgaria, Croatia, France in the Camargue and Corsica, Greece, Italy, Slovenia, Malta, Monaco, Montenegro, North Macedonia, Portugal, Spain and the Balearic Islands, and Turkey). The most northern breeding populations are at the Korgalzhyn Nature Reserve by Lake Tengiz in central Kazakhstan at around 50°N latitude, where several thousand pairs breed.

They have been recorded breeding in the United Arab Emirates at three different locations in the Abu Dhabi Emirate. In Gujarat, a coastal state in the west of India, flamingos can be observed at the Nal Sarovar Bird Sanctuary, Khijadiya Bird Sanctuary, Flamingo City, and in the Thol Bird Sanctuary. They remain there during the entire winter season.

A small feral population, presumed to be derived from birds escaped from zoos, breeds alongside some also-escaped Chilean flamingos at Zwillbrocker Venn in western Germany, close to the border with the Netherlands.

== Description ==
The greater flamingo is the largest living species of flamingo, averaging 110–150 cm (43–59 in) tall and weighing 2–4 kg (4.4–8.8 lb).

Most of the plumage is pinkish-white, but the wing coverts are red and the primary and secondary flight feathers are black. The bill is pink with a restricted black tip, and the legs are entirely pink. The call is a goose-like honking.

Chicks are covered in grey fluffy down. Subadult flamingos are paler with dark legs. Adults feeding chicks also become paler, but retain the bright pink legs. The coloration comes from the carotenoid pigments in the organisms that live in their feeding grounds. Secretions of the uropygial gland also contain carotenoids. During the breeding season, greater flamingos increase the frequency of their spreading uropygial secretions over their feathers and thereby enhance their colour. This cosmetic use of uropygial secretions has been described as applying "make-up".

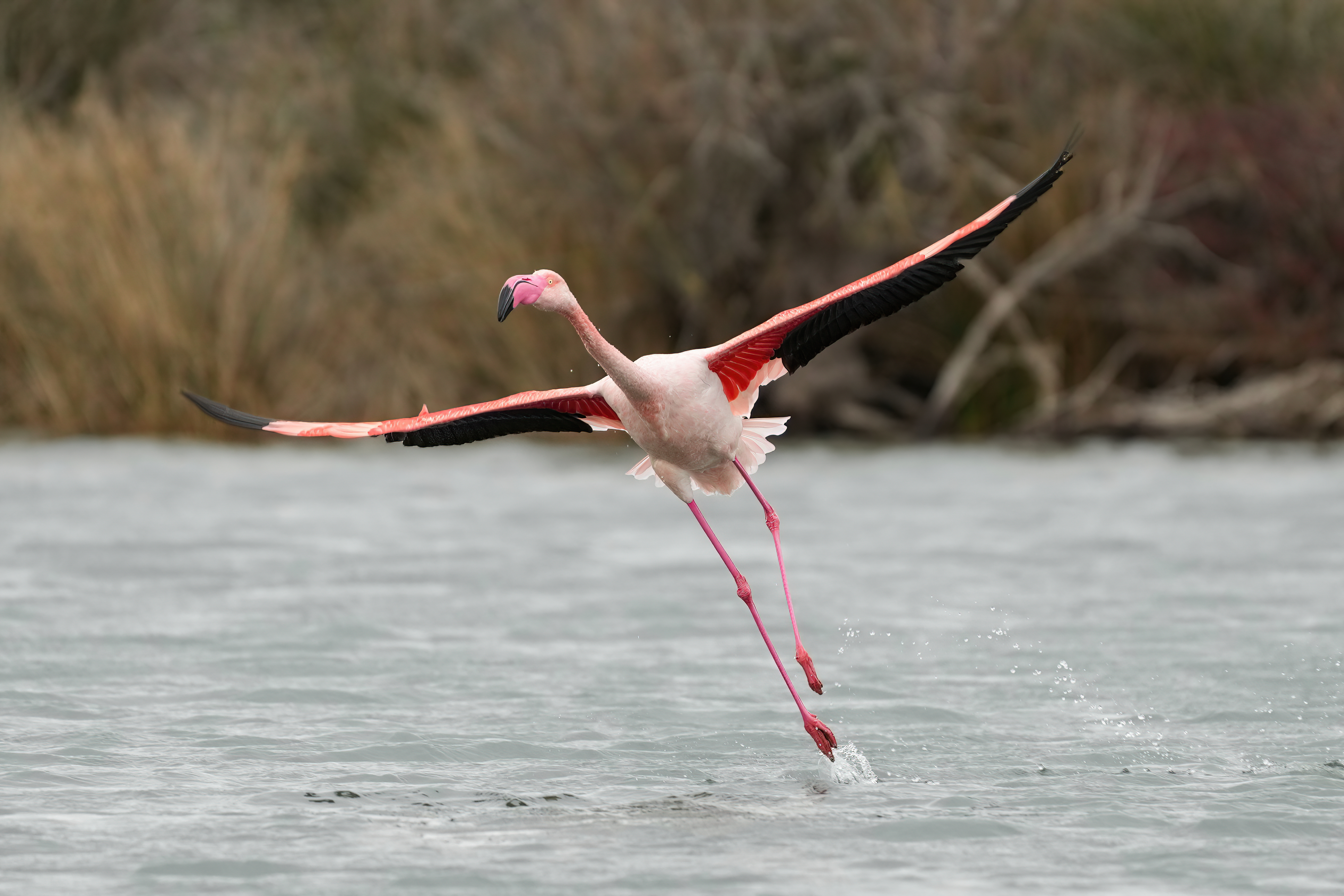
Taking off in Camargue, France

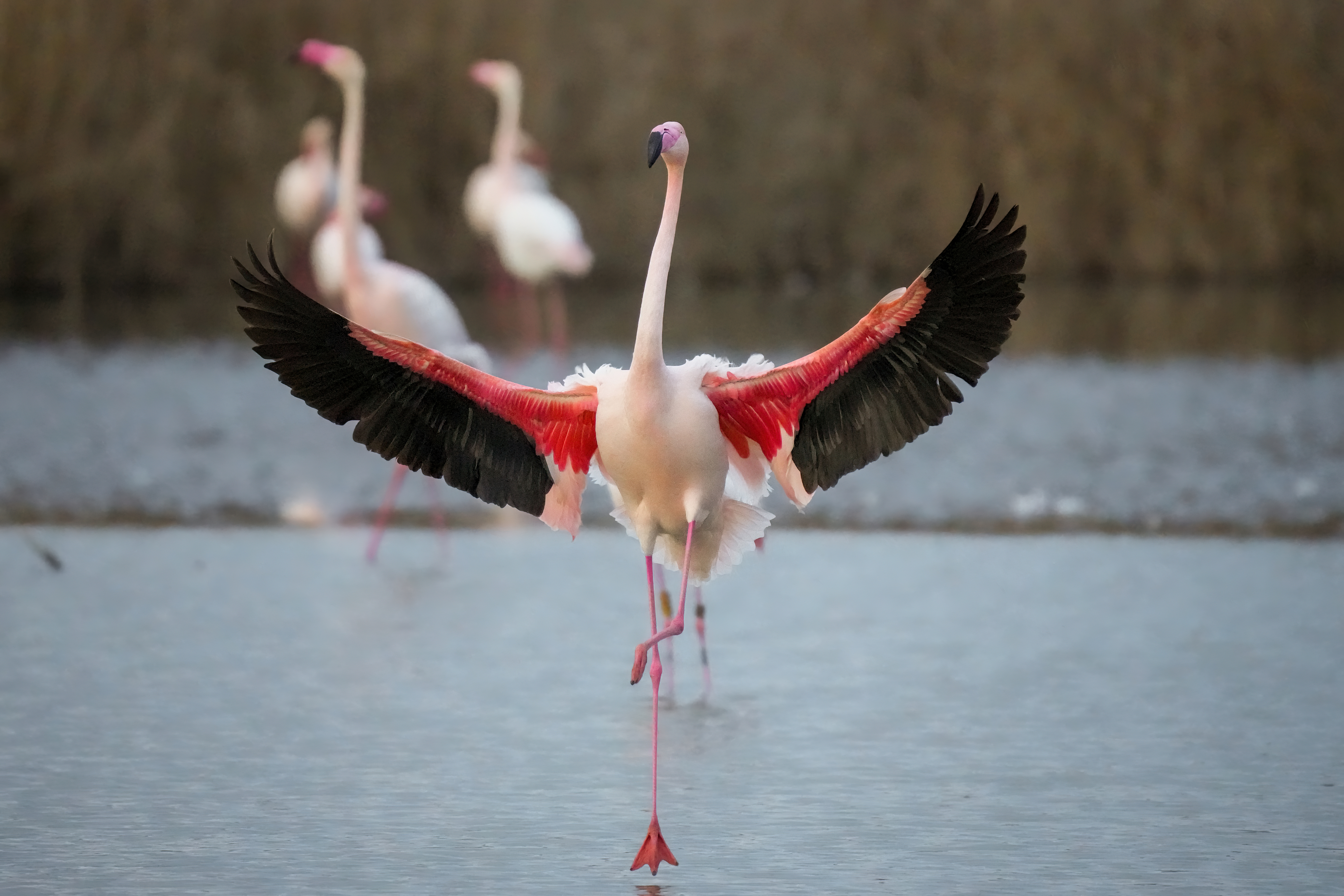
Landing in the Camargue, France

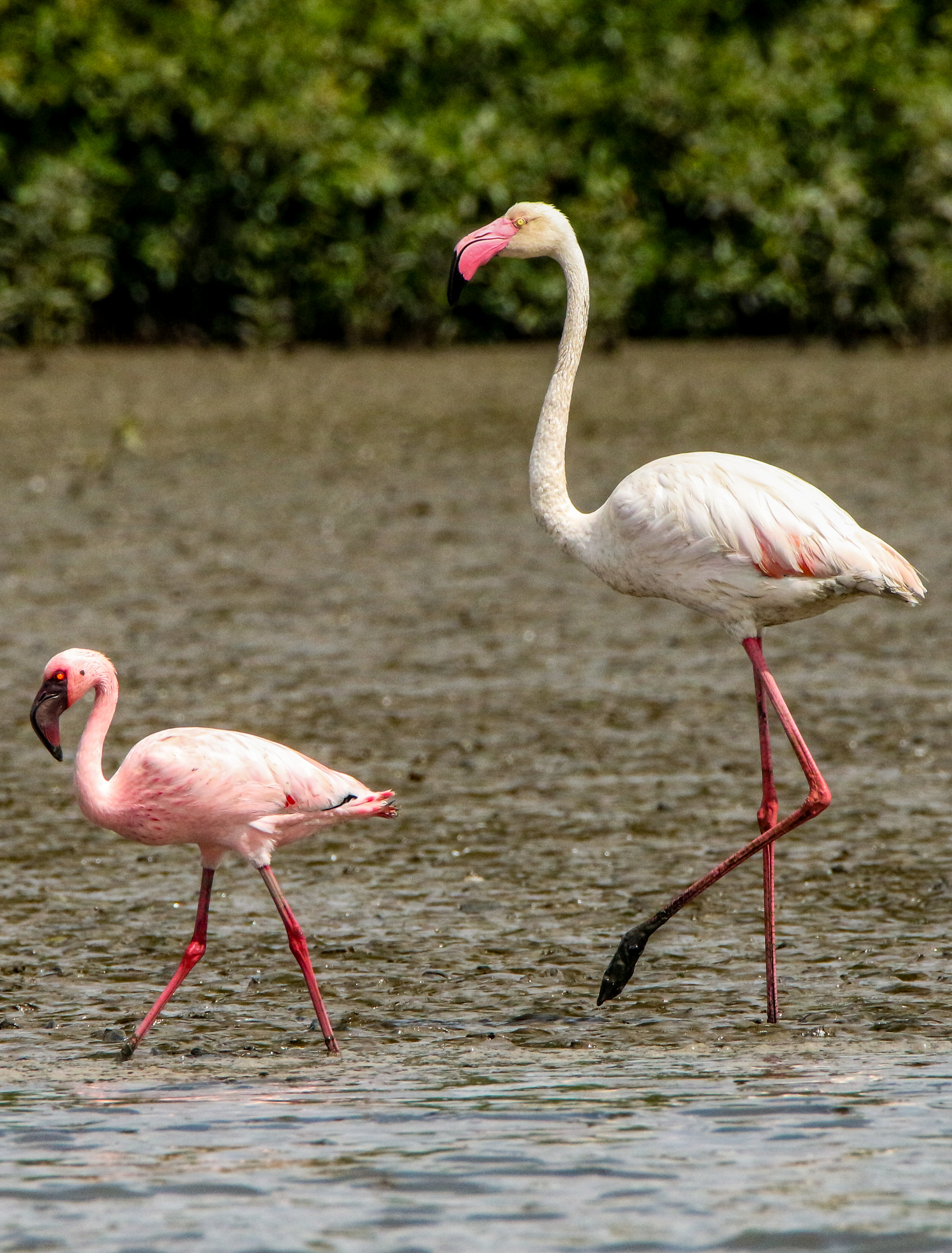
With a lesser flamingo, in Mumbai, India

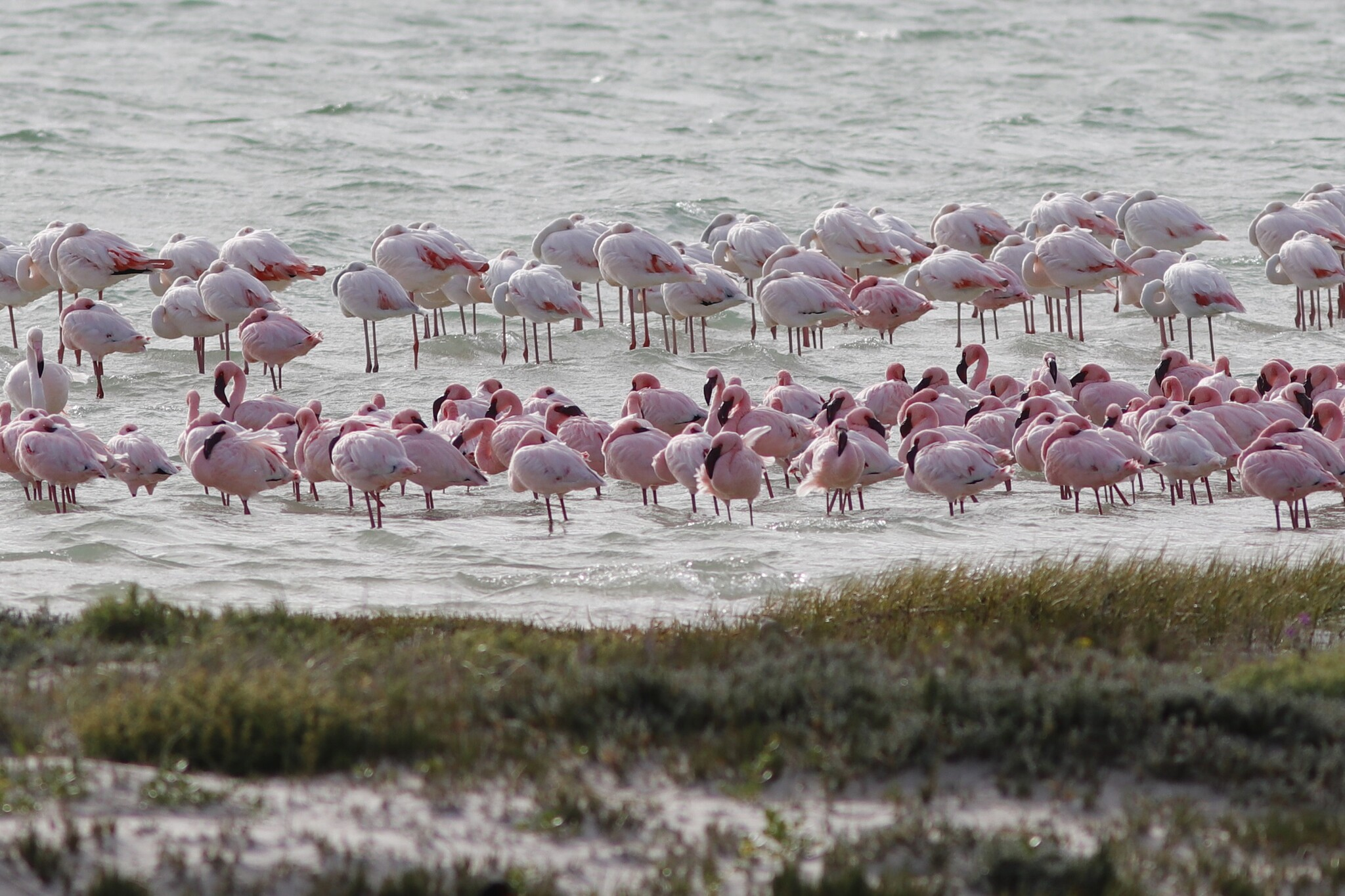
Lesser flamingos (foreground) and greater flamingos (background), in South Africa

== Ecology ==
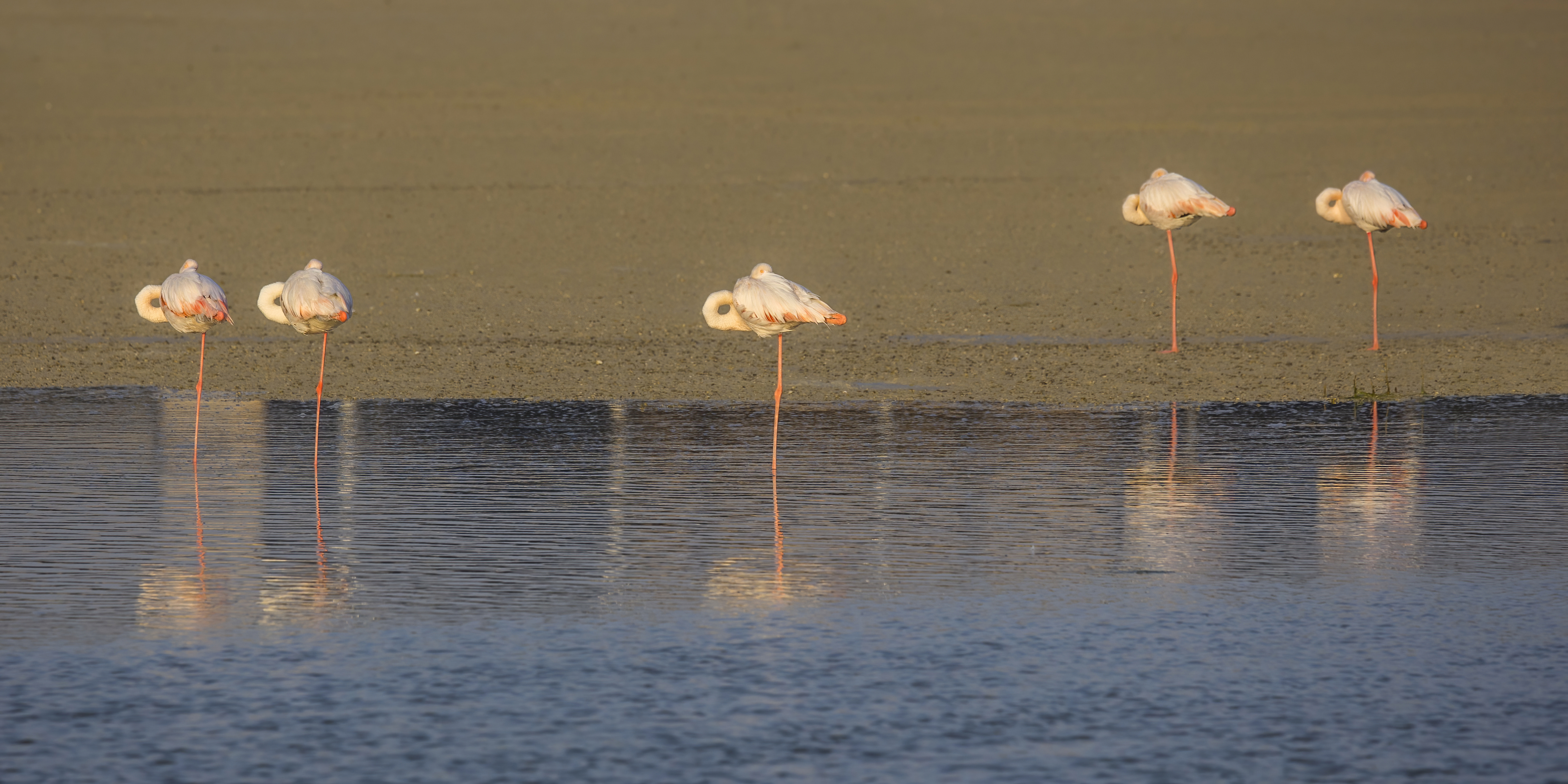
Resting, in Bahrain
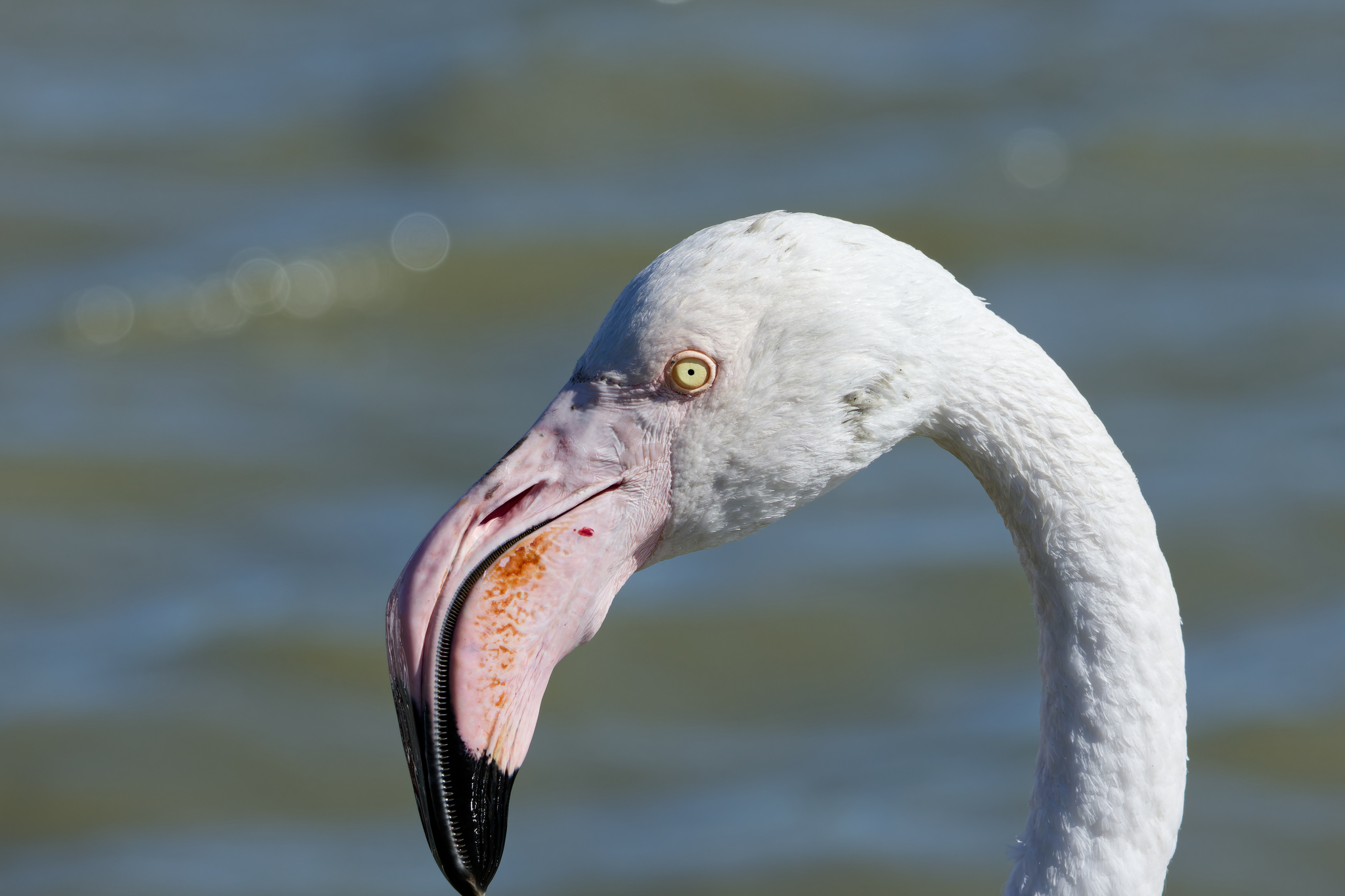
Closeup showing the beak's lamellae, in France

Like all flamingos, this species lays a single chalky-white egg on a mud mound.

Adult greater flamingos have few natural predators. Eggs and chicks may be eaten by raptors, crows, gulls, and the marabou stork (Leptoptilos crumenifer); an estimated half of the predation of greater flamingo eggs and chicks in the Mediterranean region is from the yellow-legged gull (Larus michahellis).

=== Diet and feeding ===
The greater flamingo resides in mudflats and shallow coastal lagoons with salt water. Using its feet, the bird stirs up the mud, then sucks water through its bill and filters out small shrimp, brine shrimp, other crustaceans, seeds (such as rice), blue-green algae, microalgae, other microscopic organisms (such as diatoms), aquatic insects and their larvae (such as chironomids), molluscs, annelids, nematodes, and small fish. The greater flamingo feeds with its head down, its upper jaw movable and not rigidly fixed to its skull.

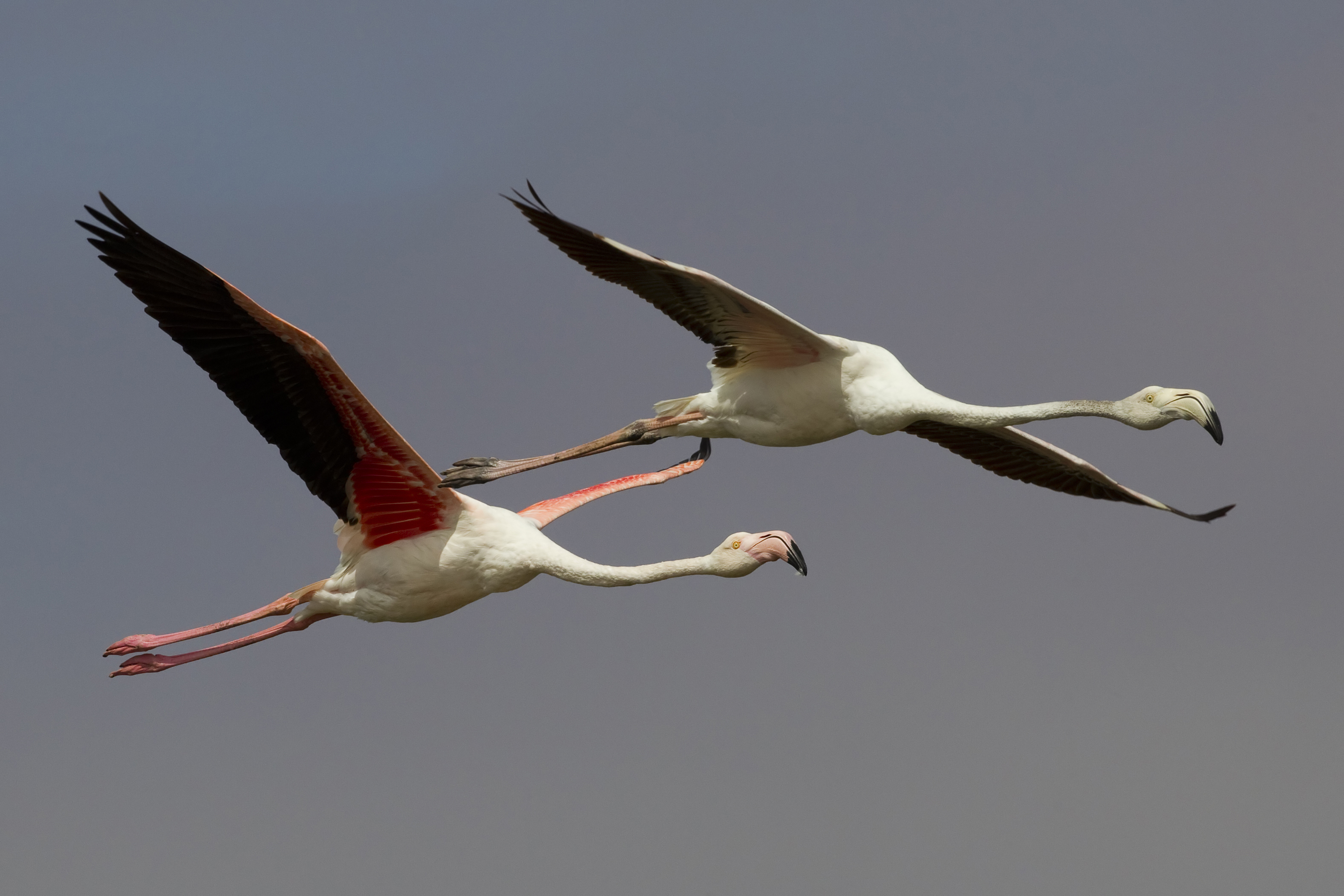
A subadult (top) with an adult (bottom) in flight

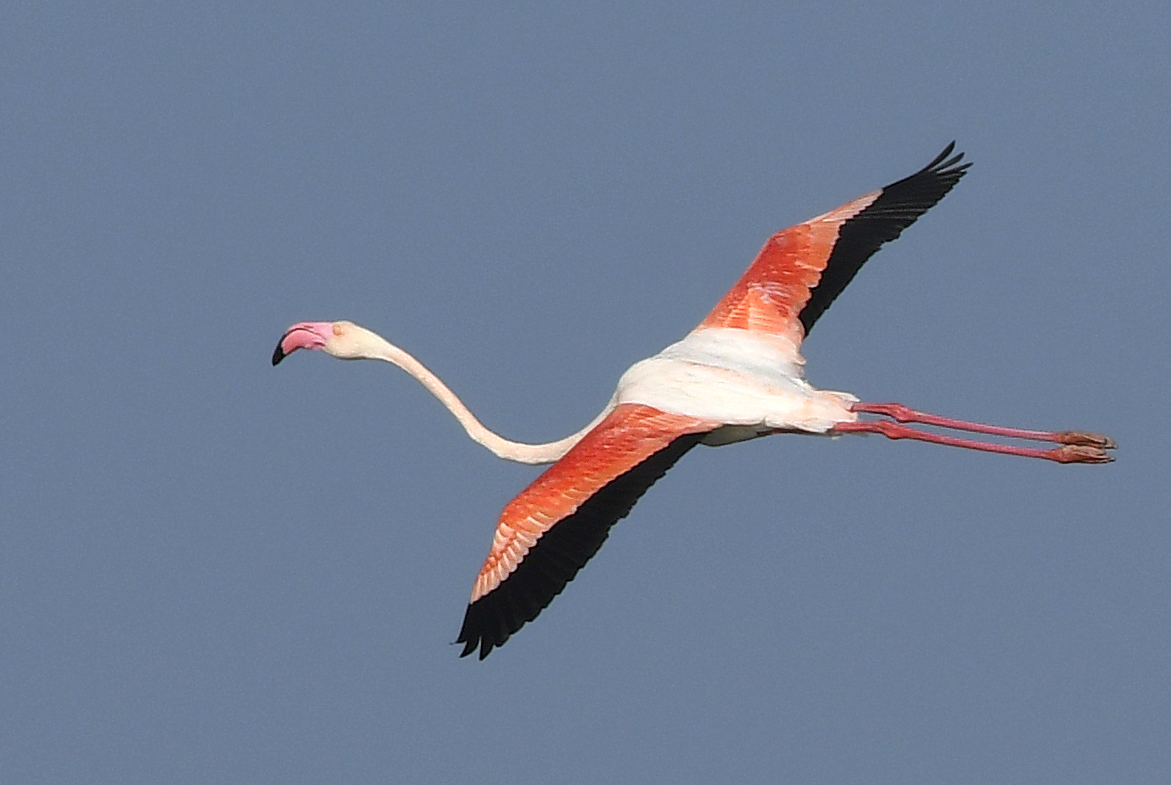
In flight at Jamnagar, India

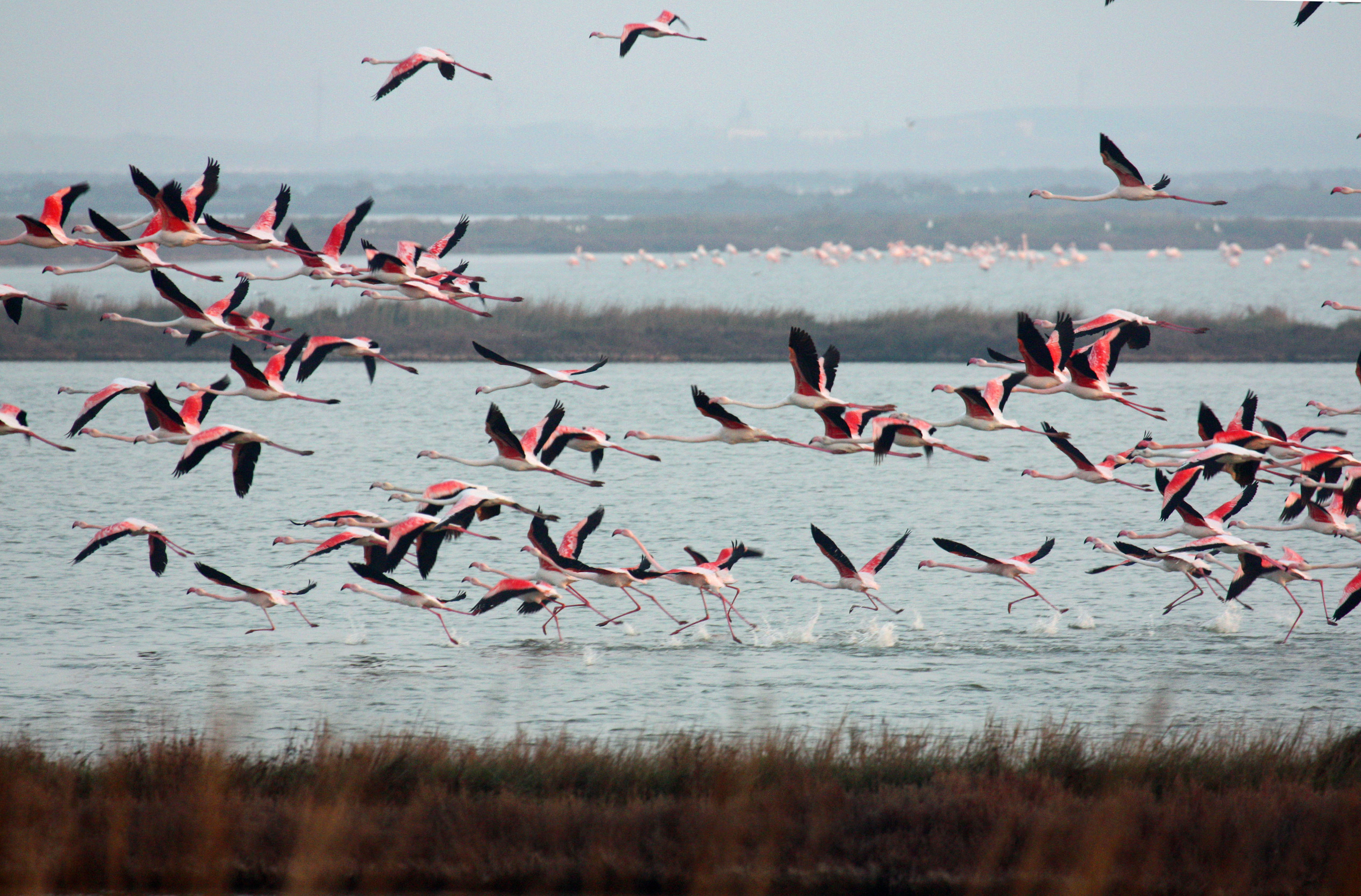
Colony in the Po River delta, Italy

A subadult feeding in Walvis Bay, Namibia

== Reproduction ==
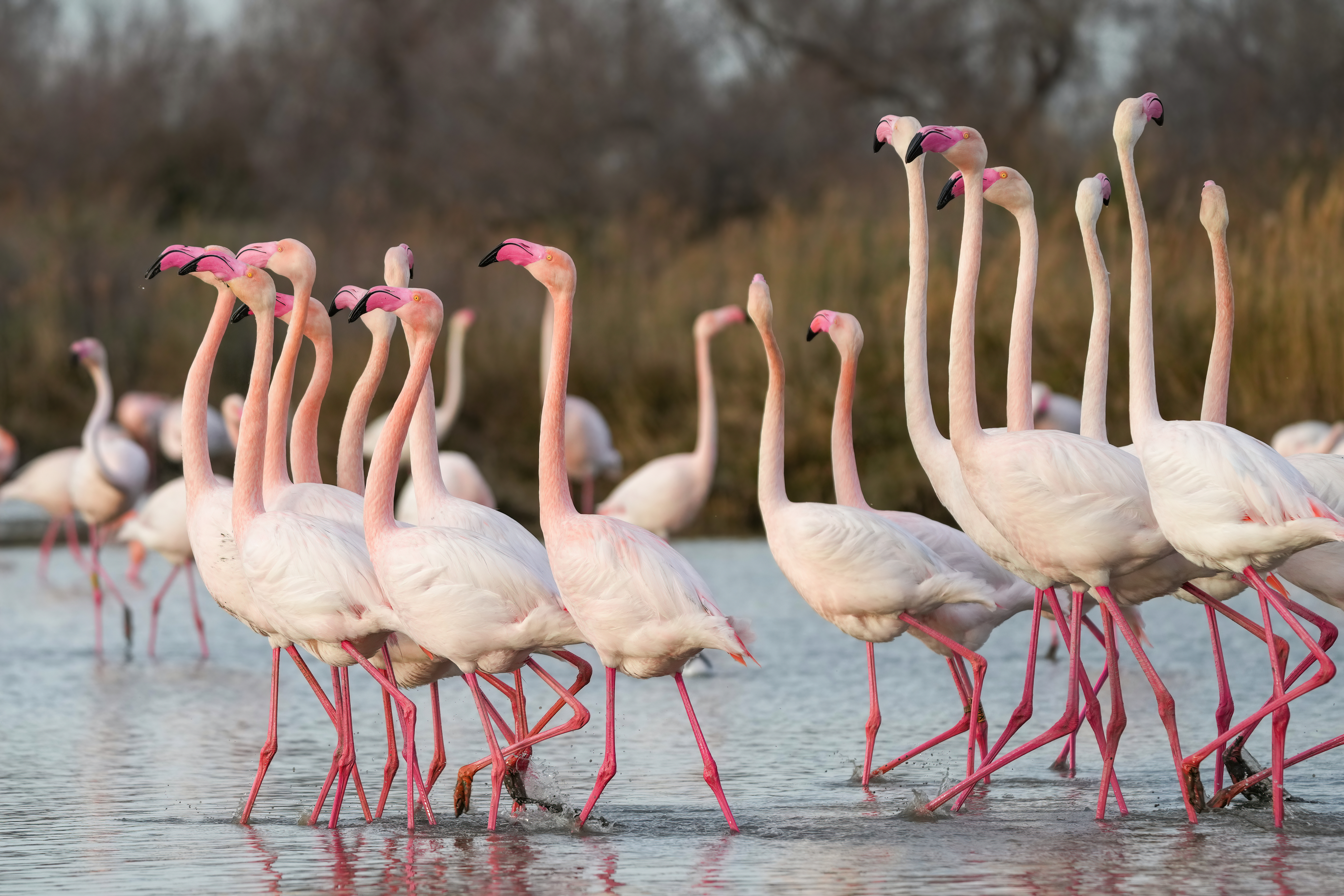
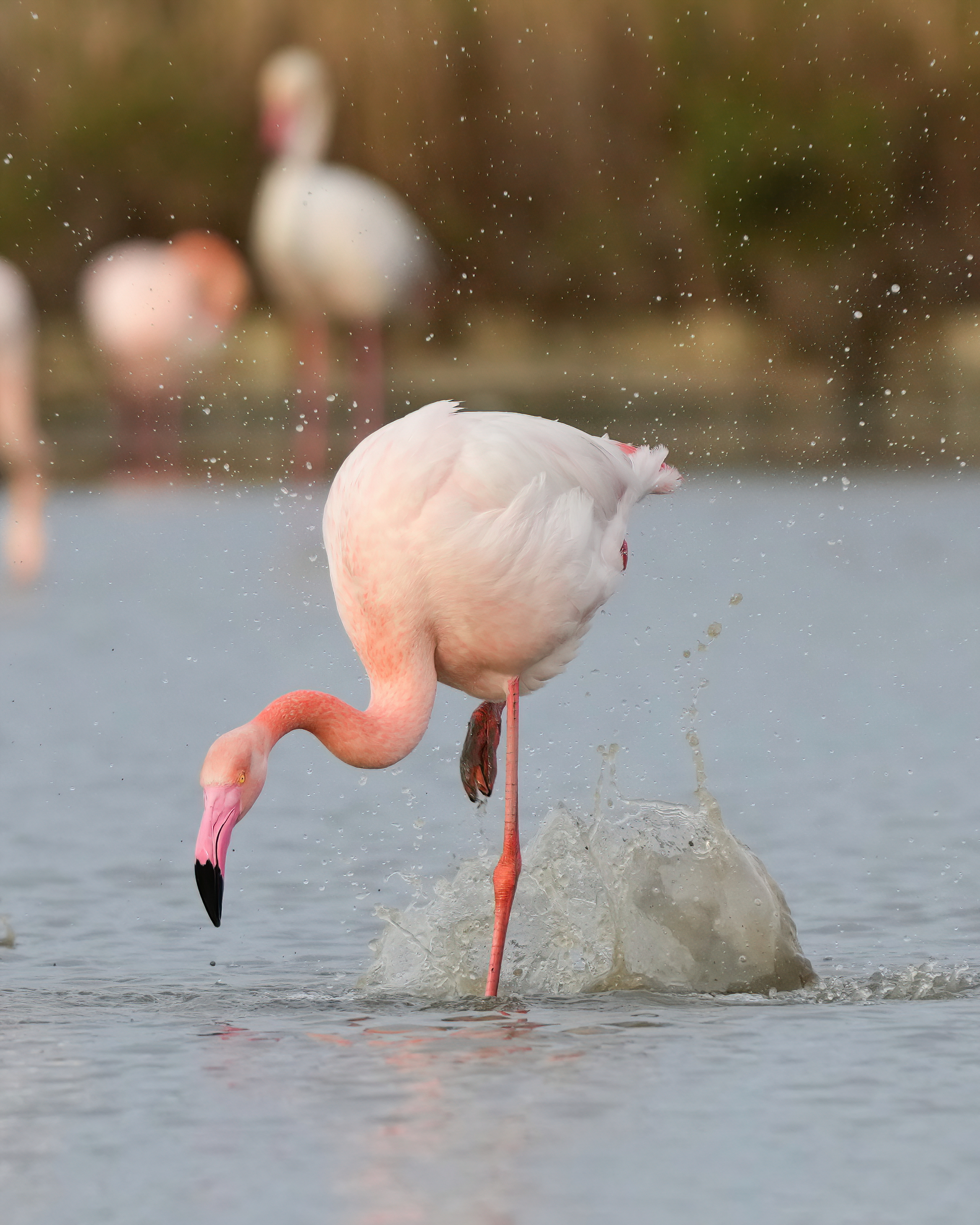
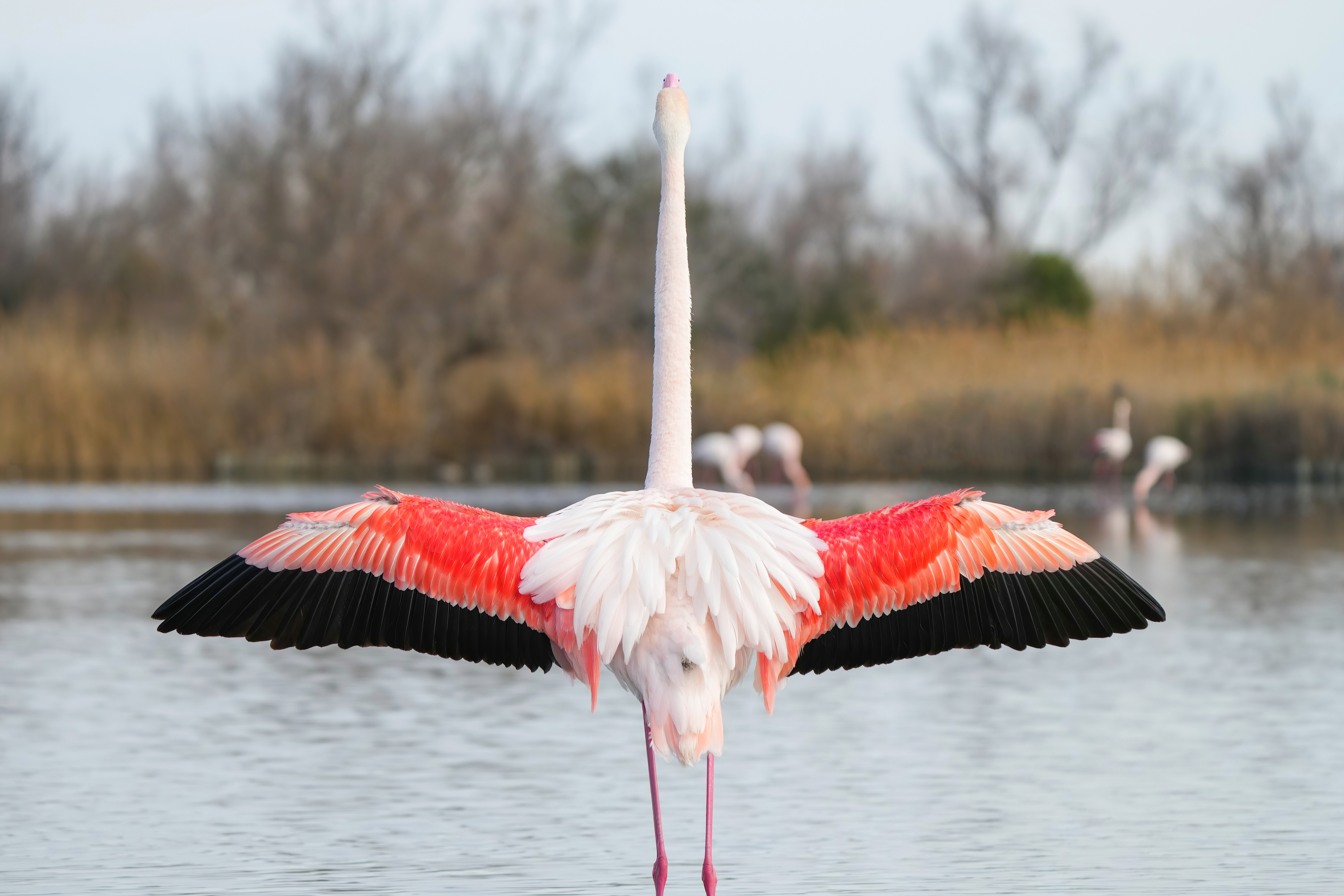
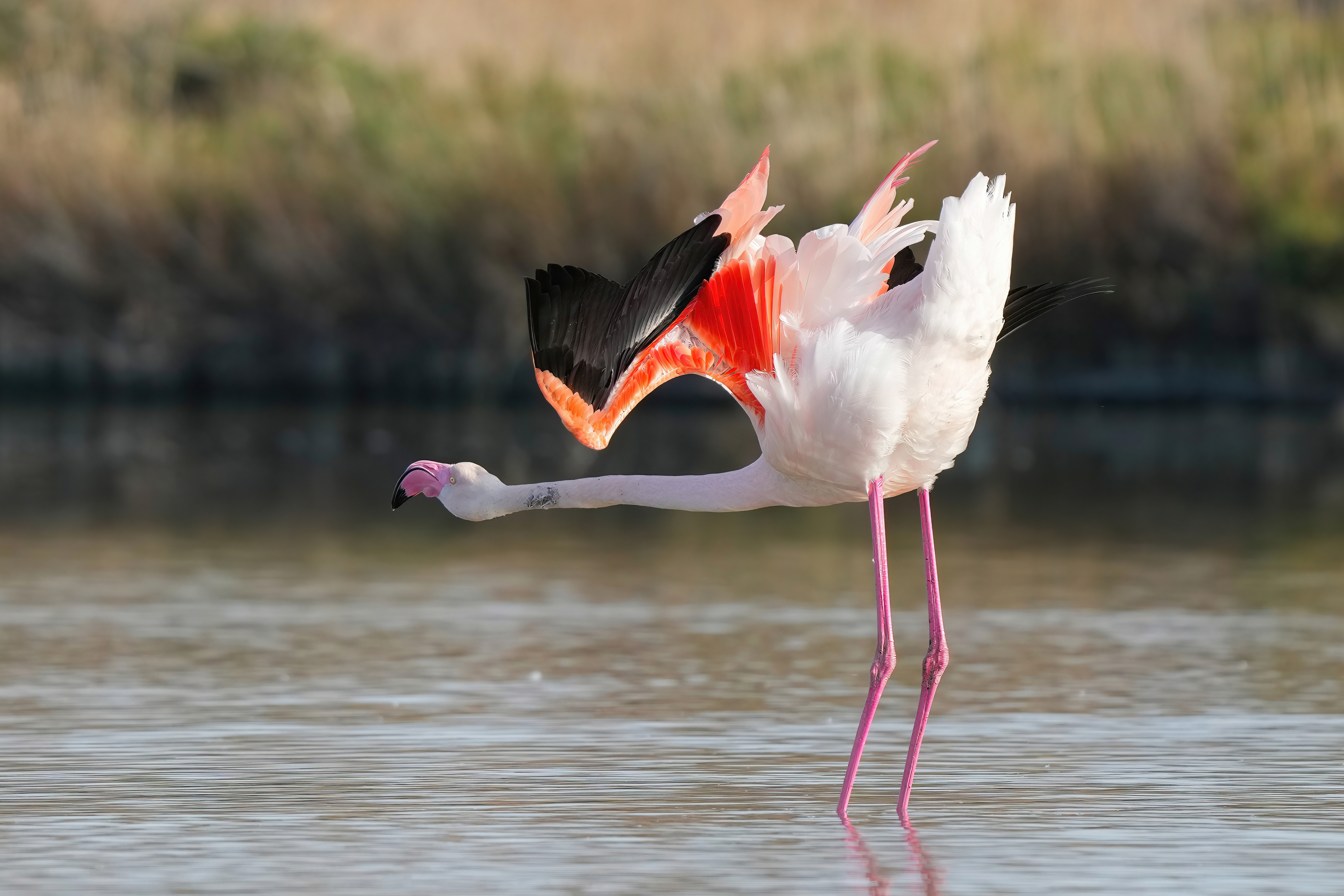
Courtship displays, in France

Unlike many other species of long-lived birds, greater flamingos do not form pair bonds that last over consecutive breeding seasons. When considering prospective breeding partners, there appears to be a preference for older, more experienced individuals. As both sexes seem to show this preference, pairs tend to consist of individuals of similar age. The species is well known for their courtship displays in large mixed-sexed groups. The complexity of an individual's courtship display may indicate that individual's age and fitness; display complexity increases until around 20 years of age, after which it begins to decrease.

While both sexes are involved in parental care, observations in captivity indicate that males are more involved than females, such as with incubation and nest protection. It is hypothesized that females may spend more time away from the nest in order to feed and recover from egg laying. Only one egg is laid, but in the event of that egg's loss, an additional egg can be laid. Eggs take 26-32 days to hatch.

Adult plumage is not acquired by most individuals until 4 years of age, but less commonly can occur as early as an age of 30 months. While sexual maturity is reached by 3 years of age, most females do not reproduce until 5-6 years old.

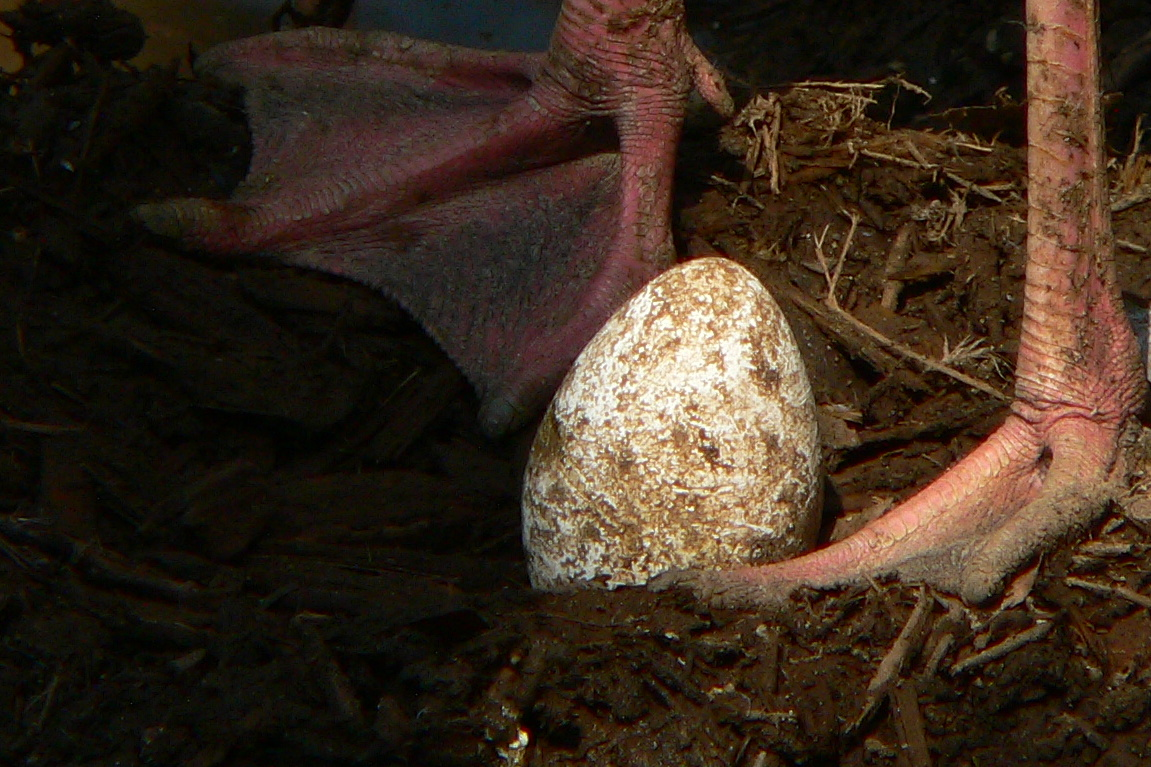
Egg at Cincinnati Zoo

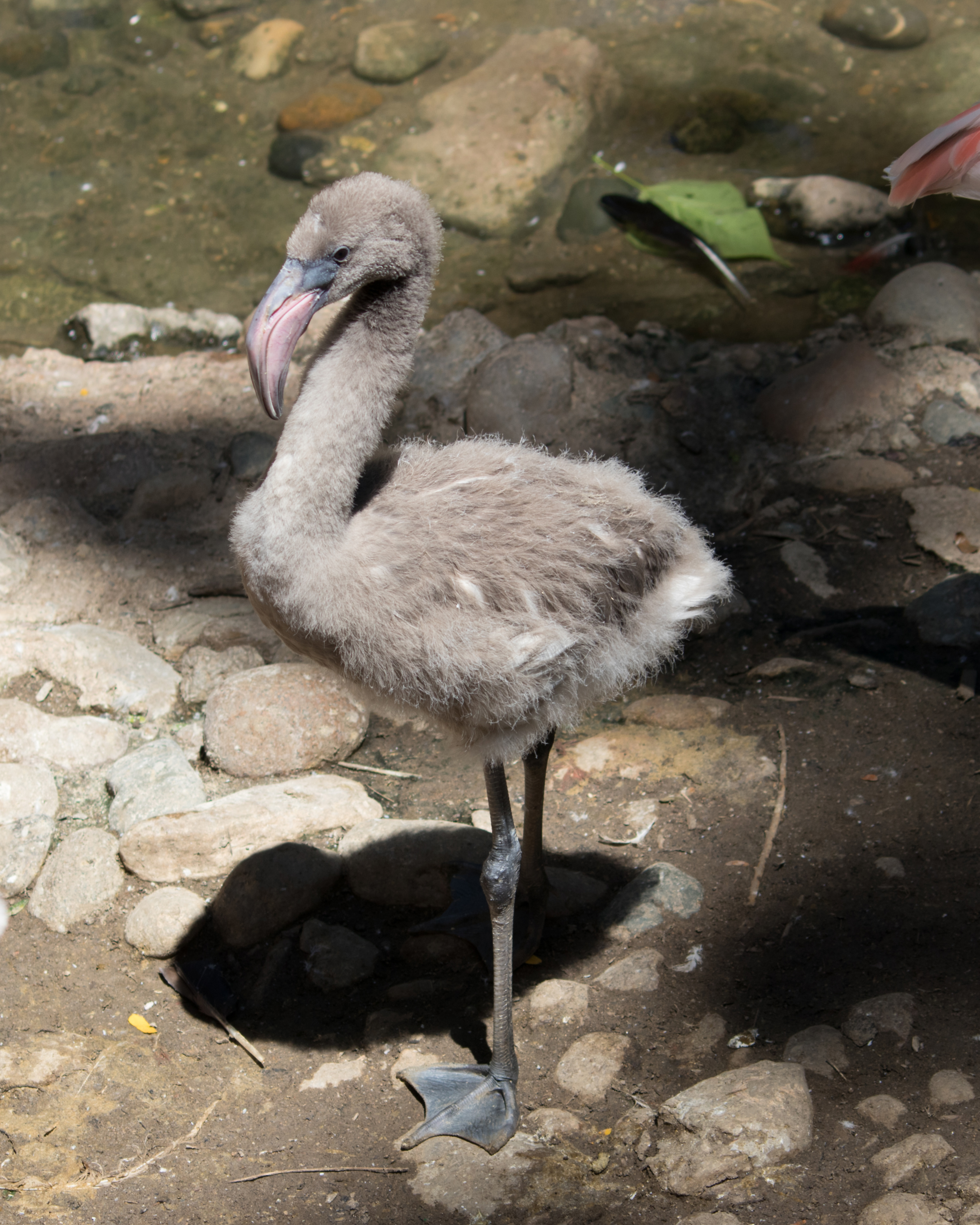
Chick with grey down

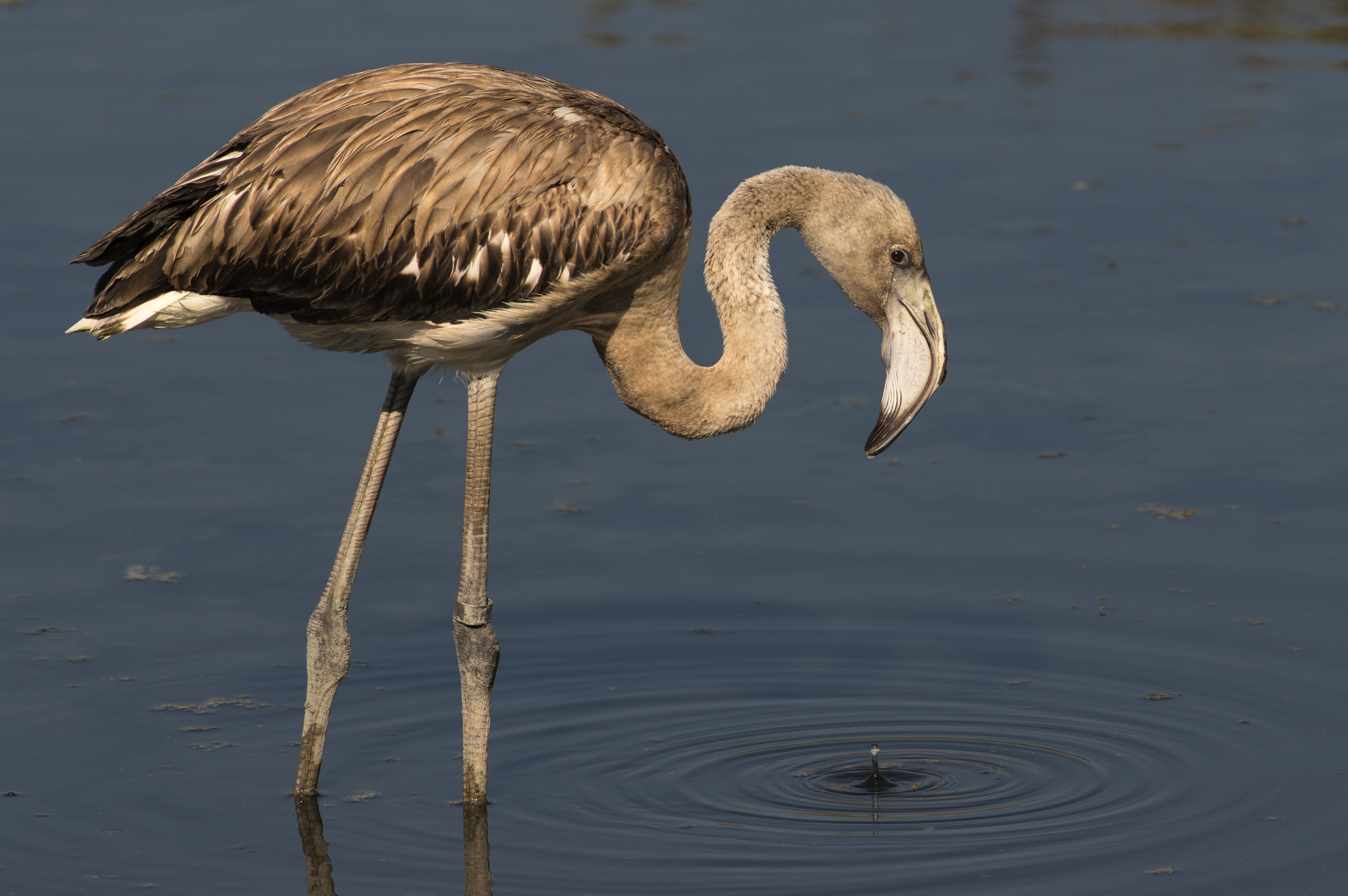
Juvenile at Ghadira Nature Reserve, Malta

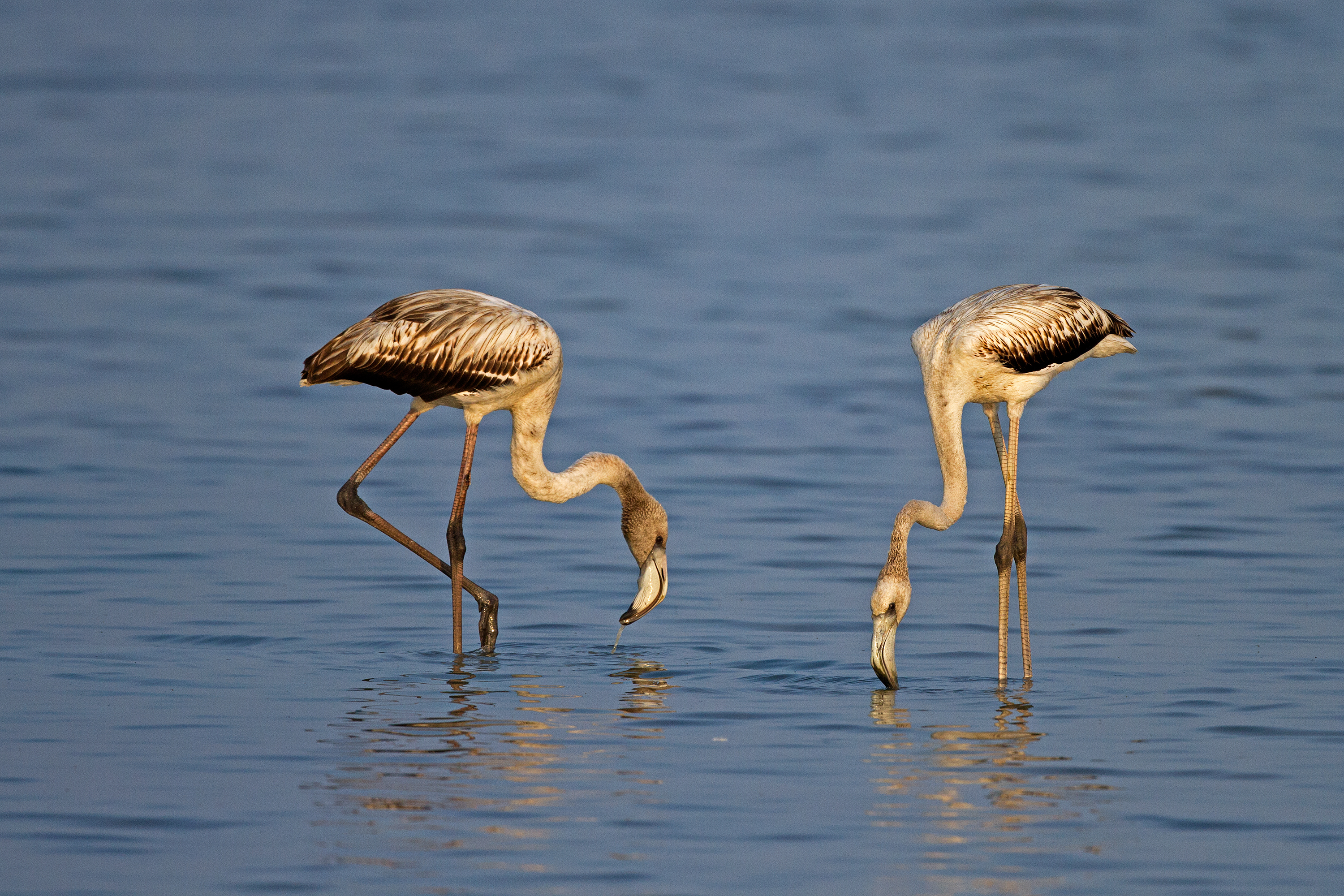
Subadults at Pulicat Lake, India

== Lifespan ==
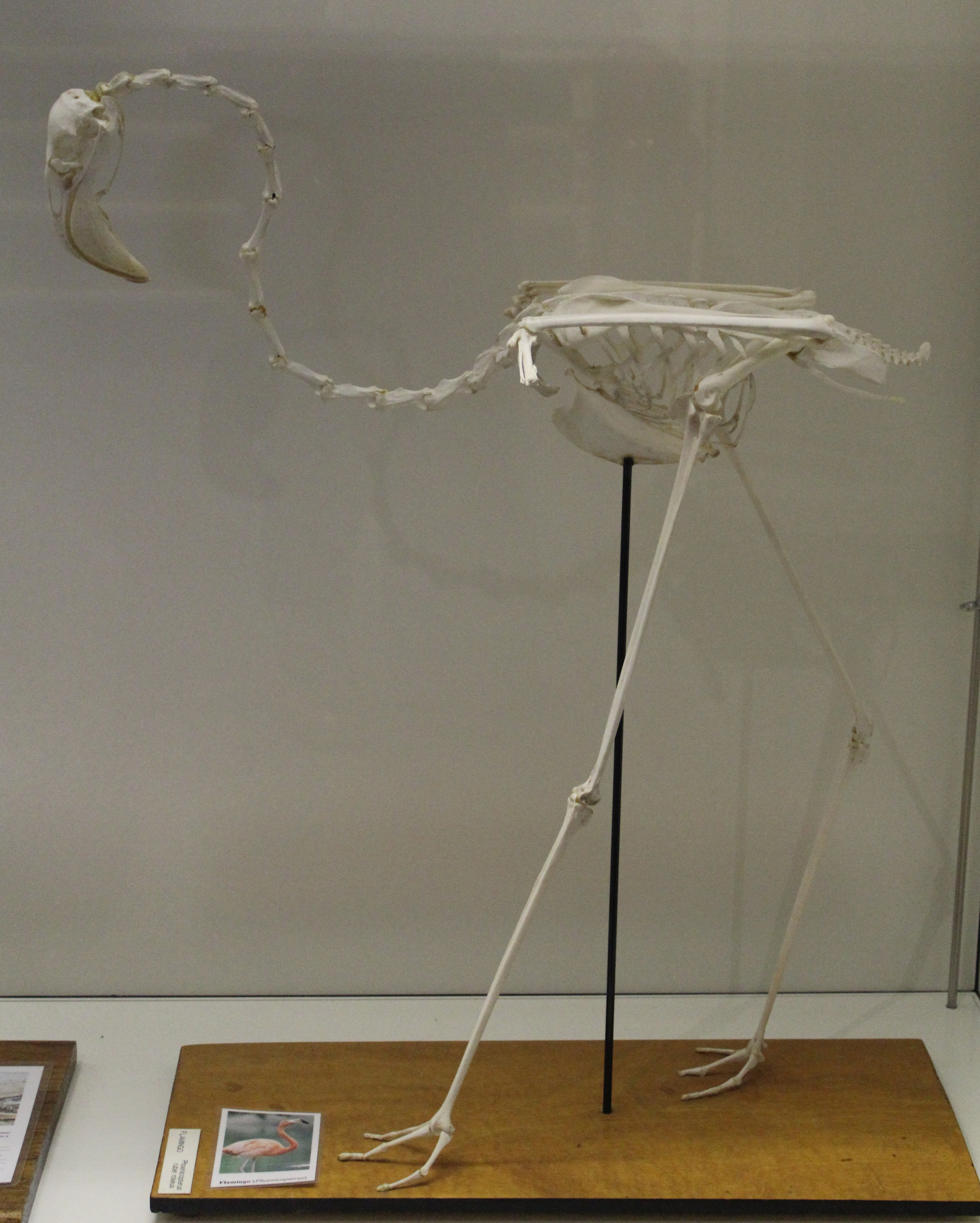
Skeleton, at the Royal Veterinary College Anatomy Museum

The typical lifespan in captivity, according to Basel Zoo, is over 60 years. In the wild, the average lifespan is 30–40 years. The oldest known greater flamingo was a bird at the Adelaide Zoo in Australia that died at the age of at least 83 years. The bird's exact age is not known; it was already a mature adult when it arrived in Adelaide in 1933. It was euthanised in January 2014 due to complications of old age.

== Conservation ==
The primary threats to flamingo populations are bacteria, toxins, and pollution in water supplies, which is usually run-off from manufacturing companies, and encroachment on their habitat.

=== In captivity ===
The first recorded zoo hatch was in 1959 at Zoo Basel. In Zoo Basel's breeding program, over 400 birds have been hatched with between 20 and 27 per year since 2000.
