= Ghadir Kuhi =

Ghadir Kuhi غدير كوهي
- Village
- Location within Iran
- Coordinates: 26°51′05″N 53°58′31″E
- Country: Iran
- Province: Hormozgan
- County: Bandar Lengeh
- Bakhsh: Shibkaveh
- Rural District: Bandar Charak

Population (2006)
  - Total: 213
- Time zone: UTC+3:30 (IRST)
  - Summer (DST): UTC+4:30 (IRDT)

Ghadir Kuhi (Persian: غدير كوهي, also Romanized as Ghadīr Kūhī) is a village in Bandar Charak Rural District, Shibkaveh District, Bandar Lengeh County, Hormozgan Province, Iran. At the 2006 census, its population was 213, in 39 families.
