= Malta 2021 Stratospheric Balloon =

Weather balloon

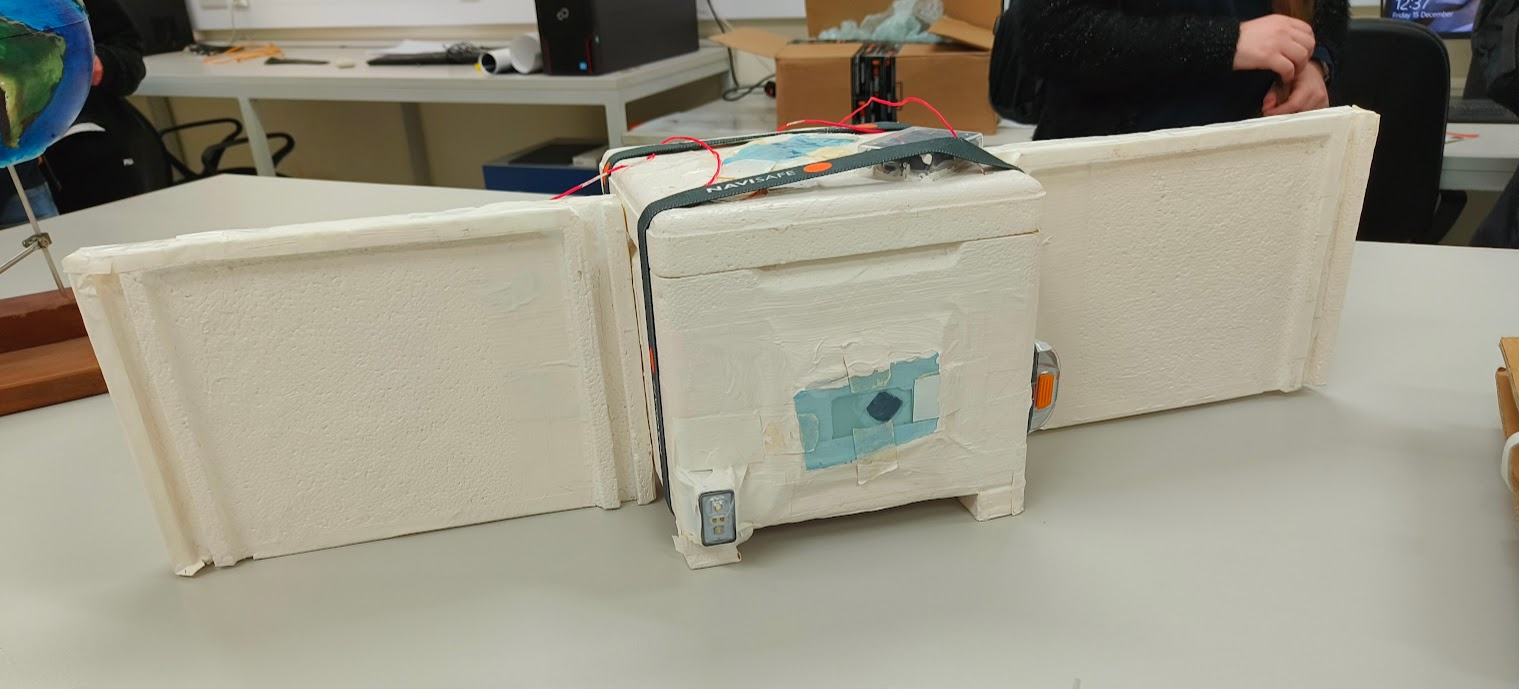
The scientific payload that was attached to the space balloon

The Malta 2021 Stratospheric Balloon was a stratospheric upper-atmosphere weather balloon launched on 13 August 2021 from the Esplora Complex in the small, island-nation of Malta. A false-advertising campaign before the launch stated that the balloon would be a "space balloon" despite the fact the stratospheric balloon only climbed to 37 kilometres (23 mi), 63 kilometres (39 mi) short of the Kármán line. The launch succeeded an earlier, failed launch in which the balloon detached from its sensory payload due to an imbalance of forces acting on the balloon.
