= Kader Asaad =

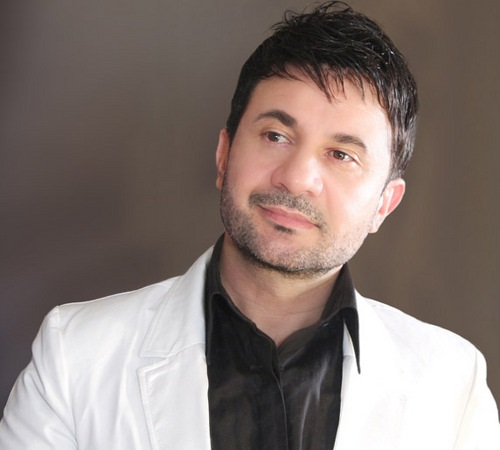
- Cover of the album Kirkuk

Background information
- Born: April 4, 1967 (age 59); Erbil, Iraqi Kurdistan
- Genres: Oriental and Arabesque
- Years active: 1985–present
- Label: Kader Asaad Productions

Kader Asaad (Central Kurdish: قادر ئەسعەد, romanized: Qadir Es'ed; 4 April 1967) is a Kurdish oriental/arabesque recording artist (singer and songwriter) and record producer. He is the founder of Kader Asaad productions.

In his early years, Kader Asaad co-founded the Jala band in Erbil. The band released their first album in 1985. Following three successful years, they released a new album called "Jala Part 2" (1988). By 1992 they released a special album in order to celebrate the establishment of the Kurdistan Region's Parliament

In 1991 Kader Asaad released his first single album titled "Kader Assad 1991" which contained 10 tracks.

Due to the Iraqi Kurdish Civil War as well as other circumstances that were a result of Iraq's geopolitical situation, he emigrated to Sweden.

== Single Albums Released ==
Name	Year	Definition
Kader Asaad	1991	
Azizan	1996	My beloved
Seferi Ishq	1998	The journey of love
Lawa lawa	2001	
Bibure	2003	Forgive me
Nostalgi	2005	Nostalgia
Kerkuk	2008	
Shayi	2012	Dance
Guíî Temen	2018	Flower of age
