= Qaleh-ye Ghadir =

Qaleh-ye Ghadir قلعه غدير
- Village
- Location within Iran
- Coordinates: 31°25′27″N 48°30′56″E
- Country: Iran
- Province: Khuzestan
- County: Ahvaz
- Bakhsh: Hamidiyeh
- Rural District: Jahad

Population (2006)
  - Total: 137
- Time zone: UTC+3:30 (IRST)
  - Summer (DST): UTC+4:30 (IRDT)

Qaleh-ye Ghadir (Persian: قلعه غدير, also Romanized as Qal‘eh-ye Ghadīr and Qal‘eh-e Ghadīr; also known as Ghal‘ehé Ghadir) is a village in Jahad Rural District, Hamidiyeh District, Ahvaz County, Khuzestan Province, Iran. At the 2006 census, its population was 137, in 22 families.
