= Khadr =

Khadr or Khader, Kheder, Khidr/Khizr, Khodr, Khudr, Xidir etc. are romanizations of خضر, an Arabic given name and surname. In surnames, it is sometimes accompanied by the definite article Al- (خضر, romanized as Al-Khodr, Al-Kheder, Al-Khudr, etc.). The Arabic word denotes the colour green, and Khidr or Al-Khidr ('the green one'), is a figure in Islam and related religions.

== Khadr/Khader ==
=== People with the surname ===
- Khadr family, a Canadian family noted for their ties to Osama bin Laden and al-Qaeda
  - Abdulkareem Khadr (born 1989)
  - Abdullah Khadr (born 1981)
  - Abdurahman Khadr (born 1982)
  - Ahmed Khadr (1948–2003)
  - Omar Khadr (born 1986)
  - Zaynab Khadr (born 1979)
- Naim Khader (1939–1981), Palestinian Fatah member
- Naser Khader (born 1963), Danish politician
- Saad Khader (born 1946), Saudi actor
- Samir Khader, Iraqi journalist

=== People with the given name ===
- Khader Abu-Seif (born 1988), Palestinian copywriter and LGBT rights activist
- Khadr El-Touni (1916–1956), Egyptian weightlifter

=== Places ===
- Khader, Fars, Iran
- al-Khader, Palestinian town west of Bethlehem, West Bank
- Hader, Syria

== Kheder ==
=== People ===
- Ferrid Kheder (born 1975), Tunisian judoka and mixed martial artist
- Qusai Kheder (born 1978), also known by mononym Qusai (and Qusai aka Don Legend the Kamelion), Saudi Arabian hip hop artist

=== Places ===
- Hajji Kheder, village in Samen Rural District, Samen District, Malayer County, Hamadan Province, Iran

== Khidr/Khizr ==
Khidr or Khizr (al-Khidr, al-Khizr, Arabic: الخضر, romanized: al-Ḫiḍr, lit. 'the green one')

- Al-Khidr, a figure in Islam
- Khiḍr Khan (died 1361)
- Khidr Khan Surak, Suri governor of Bengal
- Khizr Khan (1361–1421), founder of the 15th-century Sayyid dynasty
- Khizr M. Khan (born 1950), Pakistani American lawyer
- One of the pseudonyms used by American black supremacist Dwight York (born 1945)

== Khodr ==
=== People with the given name ===
- Khodr Alama (born 1963), Lebanese music executive and entrepreneur

=== People with the surname ===
- Jihad Khodr (born 1983), Brazilian professional surfer
- Zeina Khodr, international journalist and TV news correspondent

== Khudr ==
=== People with the given and middle name ===
- Ismail Khudr Al-Shatti (born 1949), Kuwaiti politician

=== People with the surname ===
- Humood AlKhudher (born 1989), Kuwaiti singer
- Ahlam Khudr, Sudanese activist

=== Places ===
- Sahwat al-Khudr, village in southern Syria

== Xidir ==
- Pîr Xidir Silêman (1952–2021), Yazidi-Kurdish academic, writer, politician and scholar
