= Ghadir-e Sab =

Ghadir-e Sab غديرسبع
- Village
- Location within Iran
- Coordinates: 30°54′23″N 49°11′42″E
- Country: Iran
- Province: Khuzestan
- County: Ramshir
- Bakhsh: Central
- Rural District: Abdoliyeh-ye Sharqi

Population (2006)
  - Total: 114
- Time zone: UTC+3:30 (IRST)
  - Summer (DST): UTC+4:30 (IRDT)

Ghadir-e Sab (Persian: غديرسبع, also Romanized as Ghadīr-e Sab‘; also known as 'Qadīr-e Sab‘ and Qadīr Sab‘) is a village in Abdoliyeh-ye Sharqi Rural District, in the Central District of Ramshir County, Khuzestan Province, Iran. At the 2006 census, its population was 114, in 20 families.
