= Ghadir Saberi =

Ghadir Saberi غديرصابري
- Village
- Location within Iran
- Coordinates: 26°52′41″N 53°58′03″E
- Country: Iran
- Province: Hormozgan
- County: Bandar Lengeh
- Bakhsh: Shibkaveh
- Rural District: Bandar Charak

Population (2006)
  - Total: 128
- Time zone: UTC+3:30 (IRST)
  - Summer (DST): UTC+4:30 (IRDT)

Ghadir Saberi (Persian: غديرصابري, also Romanized as Ghadīr Şāberī; also known as Ghadīr and Ghadīr-e Āberī) is a village in Bandar Charak Rural District, Shibkaveh District, Bandar Lengeh County, Hormozgan Province, Iran. At the 2006 census, its population was 128, in 27 families.
