= Kader Sevinc =

Turkish poet and statesperson (born 1981)

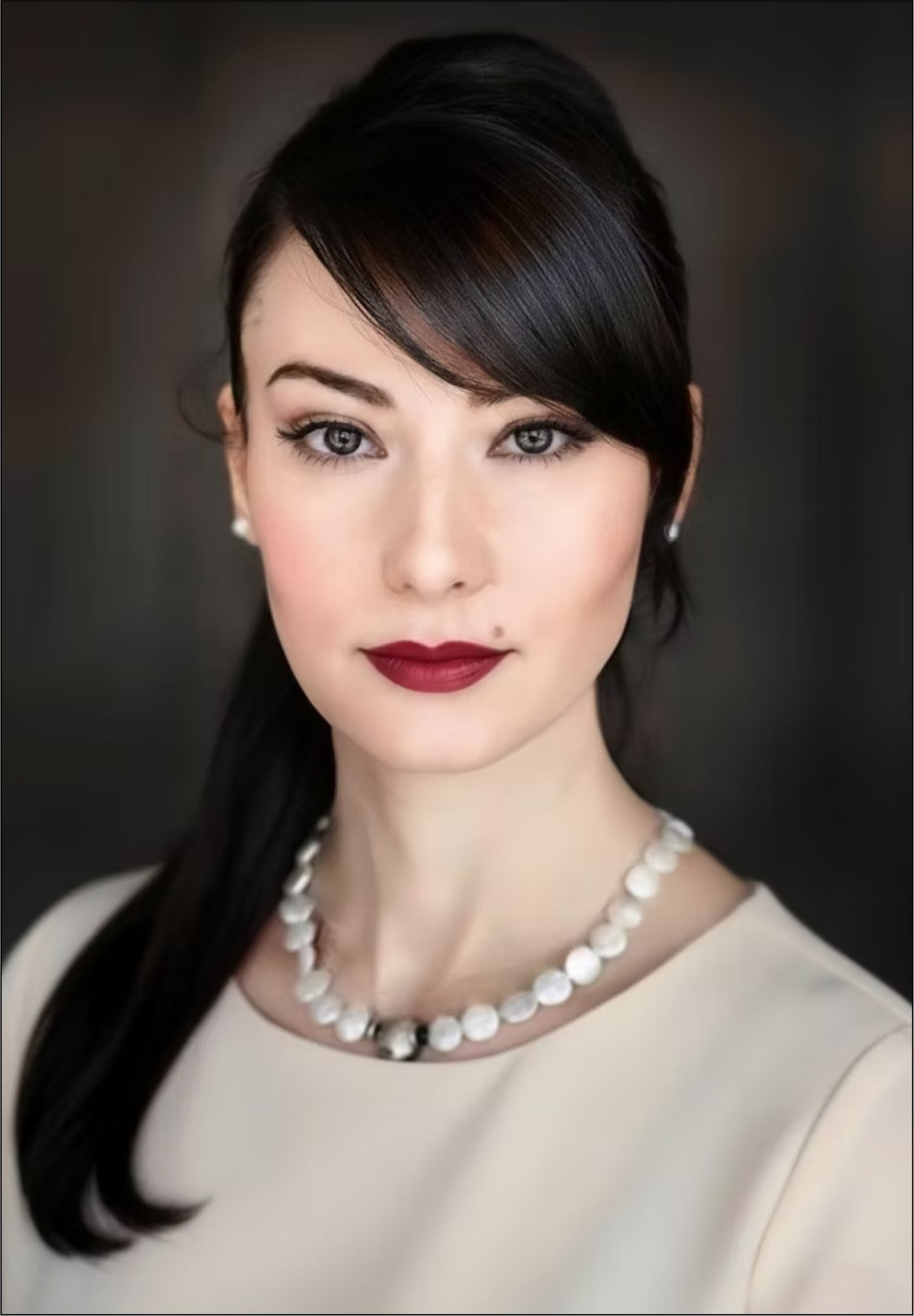
- Portrait of Kader Sevinc, photographed in 2025.

Personal details
- Citizenship: European Union, Turkey
- Education: CERIS

Kader Sevinc (also known as Sevinc Kader) is a Brussels-based international strategist, certified board advisor, and global affairs executive with over two decades of experience in global affairs, regulatory environments, and strategic decision-making. Sevinc is the founder and chief executive officer of Forward 1919 Global Strategic Advisory, a Brussels-based strategic advisory firm focusing on geopolitical strategy, EU policy, transatlantic relations, institutional advisory, and artificial intelligence governance. She also leads the European AI Hub, a platform focused on artificial intelligence policy and innovation in Europe.

She served for approximately 15 years as the European Union representative of the CHP and as a board member of one of the largest groups of the European Parliament, concluding her mandates in 2023 and 2024, respectively.

She was a transatlantic fellow at Johns Hopkins University’s School of Advanced International Studies (SAIS) in Washington, D.C., from 2012 to 2018, and a visiting scholar at New York University in 2017.

She has participated in public policy and civic engagement initiatives across Europe and the United States.

She is among the delegates of the 2050 Innovation Lab, a program organized by Diplomatic Courier in Washington, D.C.

== Education ==
Sevinc completed the Jean Monnet European Integration Programme at Akdeniz University. She undertook executive training in strategic negotiation at the Diplomatic School of Brussels (CERIS). She completed a summer-semester, on-campus programme in business communication at Harvard University and later completed the AI and Digital Transformation certificate programme at Saïd Business School, University of Oxford. She holds a European Board Diploma from ecoDa (Brussels) and a certification from the International Corporate Governance Network (ICGN) in London. Sevinc obtained a Master’s degree in International Relations from the Centre Européen de Recherches Internationales et Stratégiques (CERIS), graduating with grande distinction; her master’s thesis focused on theories of international negotiation and the European Union. She writes extensively on the European Union, global affairs, artificial intelligence, and international negotiation strategies, including negotiations with the European Union. Her work includes the article “How to Negotiate with the EU? Theories and Practice”, published in *Turkish Policy Quarterly*.

== Public speaking and policy engagement ==
Sevinc is a frequent speaker in international policy circles and has participated in conferences, panels, and policy discussions at European Union institutions and international organizations, including the European Commission, the European Parliament, and the United Nations in New York. Her speaking engagements have also included academic institutions such as the College of Europe (Bruges and Natolin), Boston University, the University of Maryland, and various European think tanks, including the European Policy Centre, the Heinrich Böll Foundation (Europe), the Friedrich Ebert Foundation (Europe), the Foundation for European Progressive Studies (FEPS), and the German Marshall Fund of the United States.

She is also a published poet. In 2014, she released a jazz album titled River-long Loneliness, combining spoken poetry with jazz music.

She is a member of PEN Flanders and Passa Porta, literary organizations based in Brussels.
