= Hajji Kheder =

Hajji Kheder حاجي خدر
- Village
- Location within Iran
- Coordinates: 34°07′38″N 48°44′54″E
- Country: Iran
- Province: Hamadan
- County: Malayer
- Bakhsh: Samen
- Rural District: Samen

Population (2006)
  - Total: 60
- Time zone: UTC+3:30 (IRST)
  - Summer (DST): UTC+4:30 (IRDT)

Hajji Kheder (Persian: حاجي خدر, also Romanized as Ḩājjī Kheder and Ḩājī Kheder) is a village in Samen Rural District, Samen District, Malayer County, Hamadan Province, Iran. At the 2006 census, its population was 60, in 29 families.
