= Manger =

Structure to hold food for animals

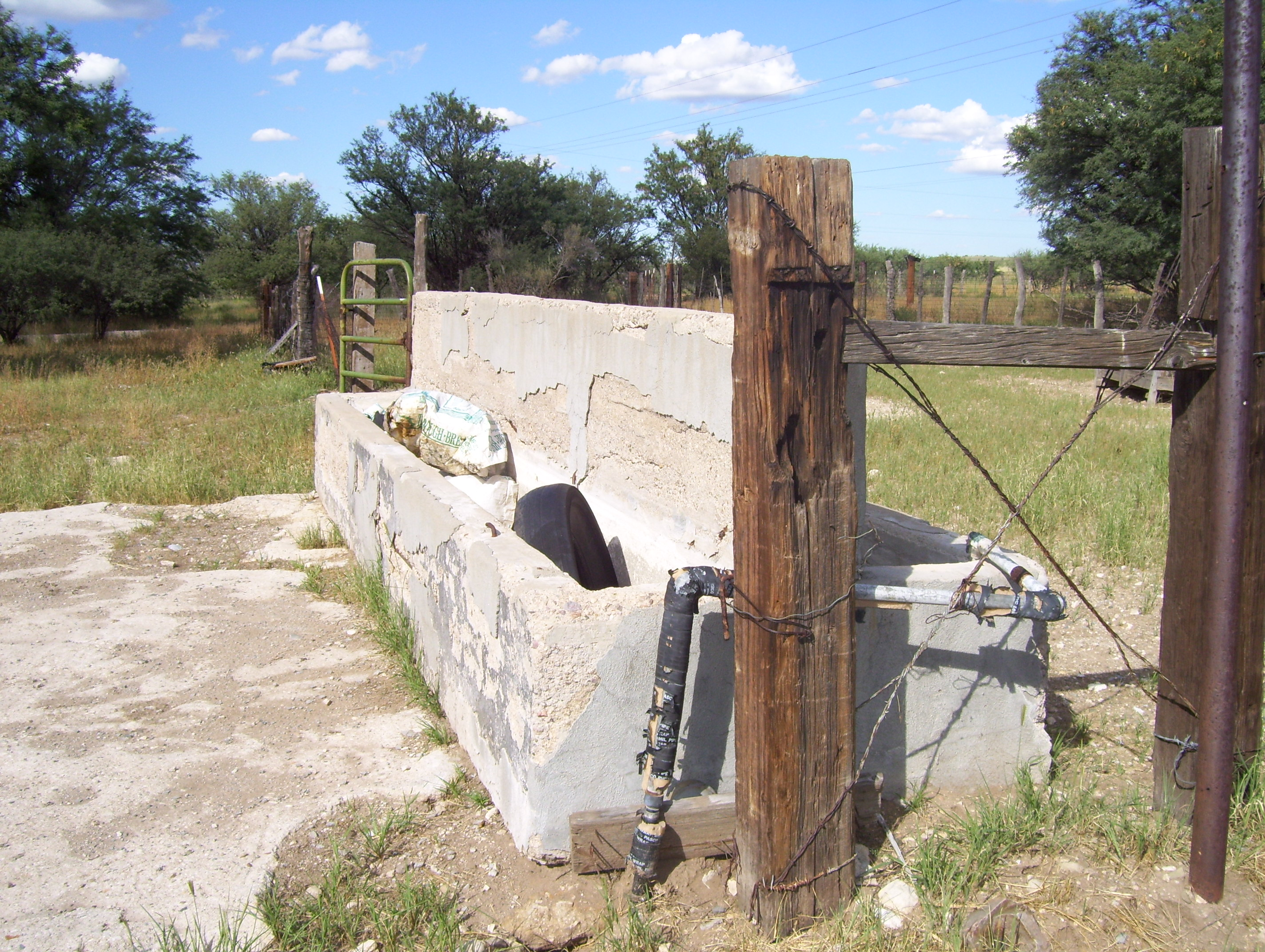
Modern livestock trough near Empire Ranch, Arizona.

A manger or trough is a rack for fodder, or a structure or feeder used to hold food for animals. The word comes from the Old French mangier (meaning "to eat"), from Latin mandere (meaning "to chew").

Mangers are mostly used in livestock raising and generally found at stables and farmhouses. They are also used to feed wild animals, e.g., in nature reserves.

A similar trough providing drinking water for domestic or non-domestic animals is a watering trough and may be part of a larger watering structure called abreuvoir.

== The manger in Christianity ==
The manger is associated with nativity scenes where Mary and Joseph, forced by necessity to stay in a room for animals instead of a guest room, used a manger as a makeshift crib for the Baby Jesus. (Greek: φάτνη phatnē; Luke 2:7).

== Gallery ==
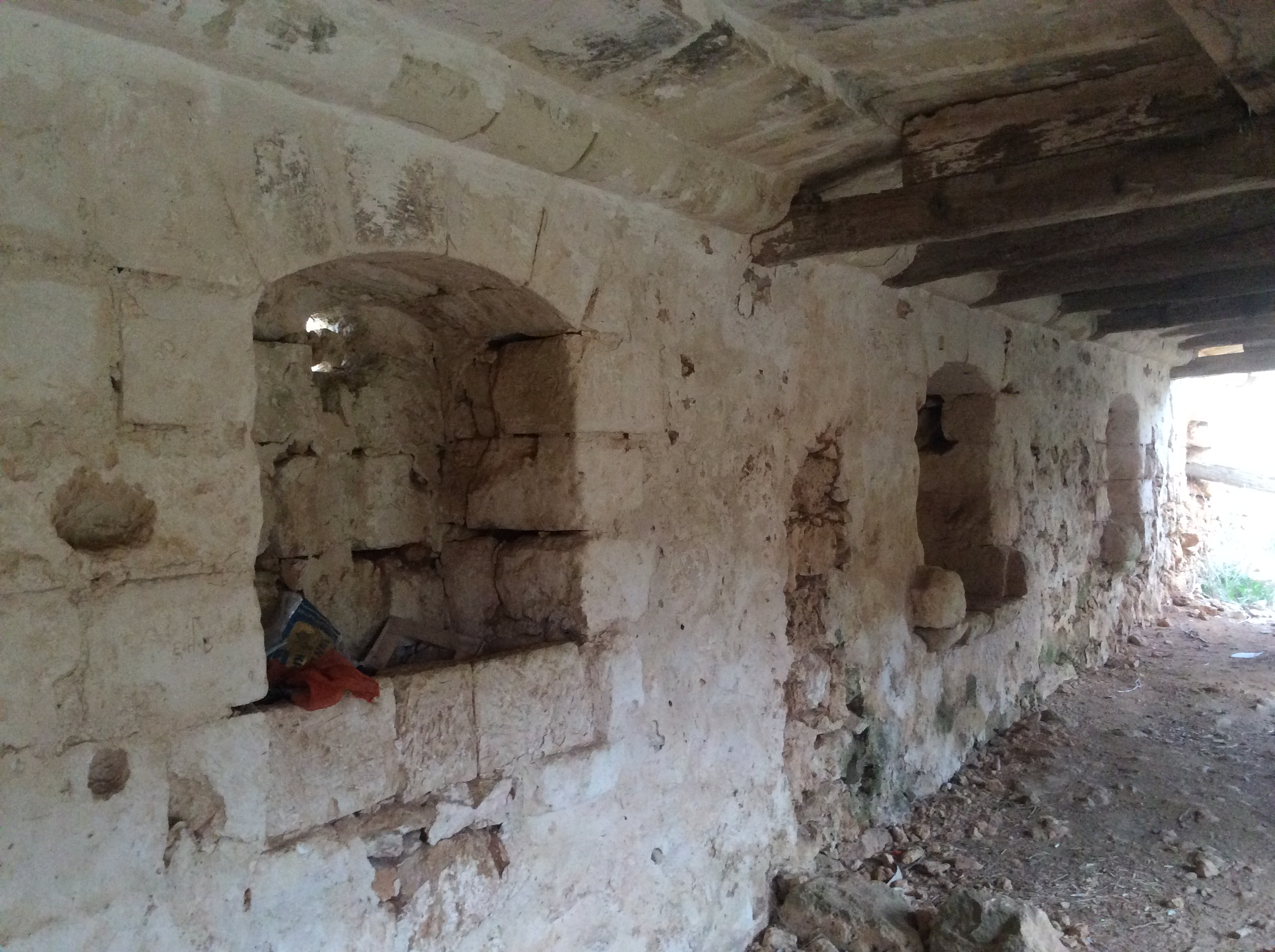
18th century limestone mangers at The Devil's Farmhouse in Mellieha, Malta.

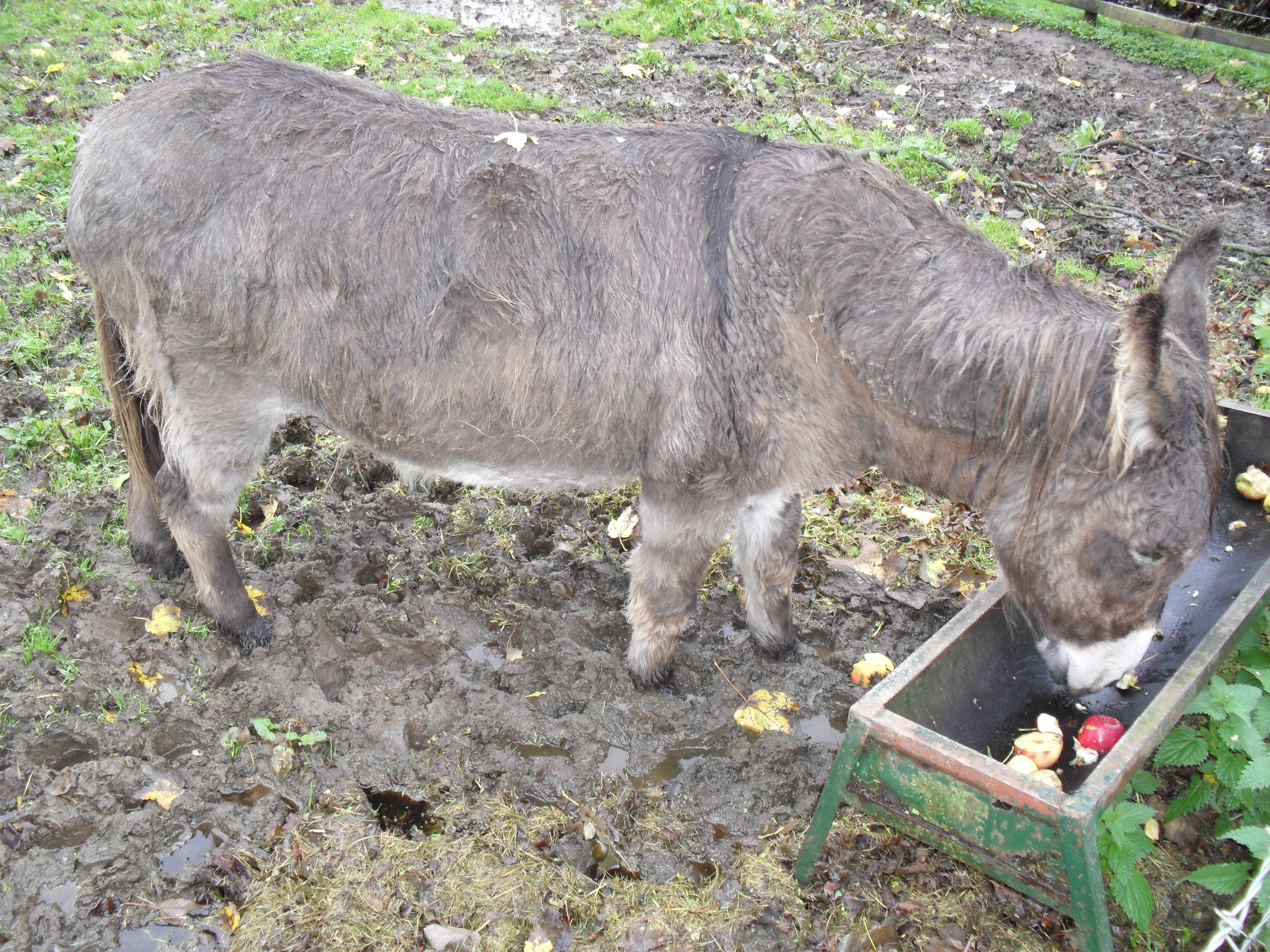
Donkey eating apples from a steel trough

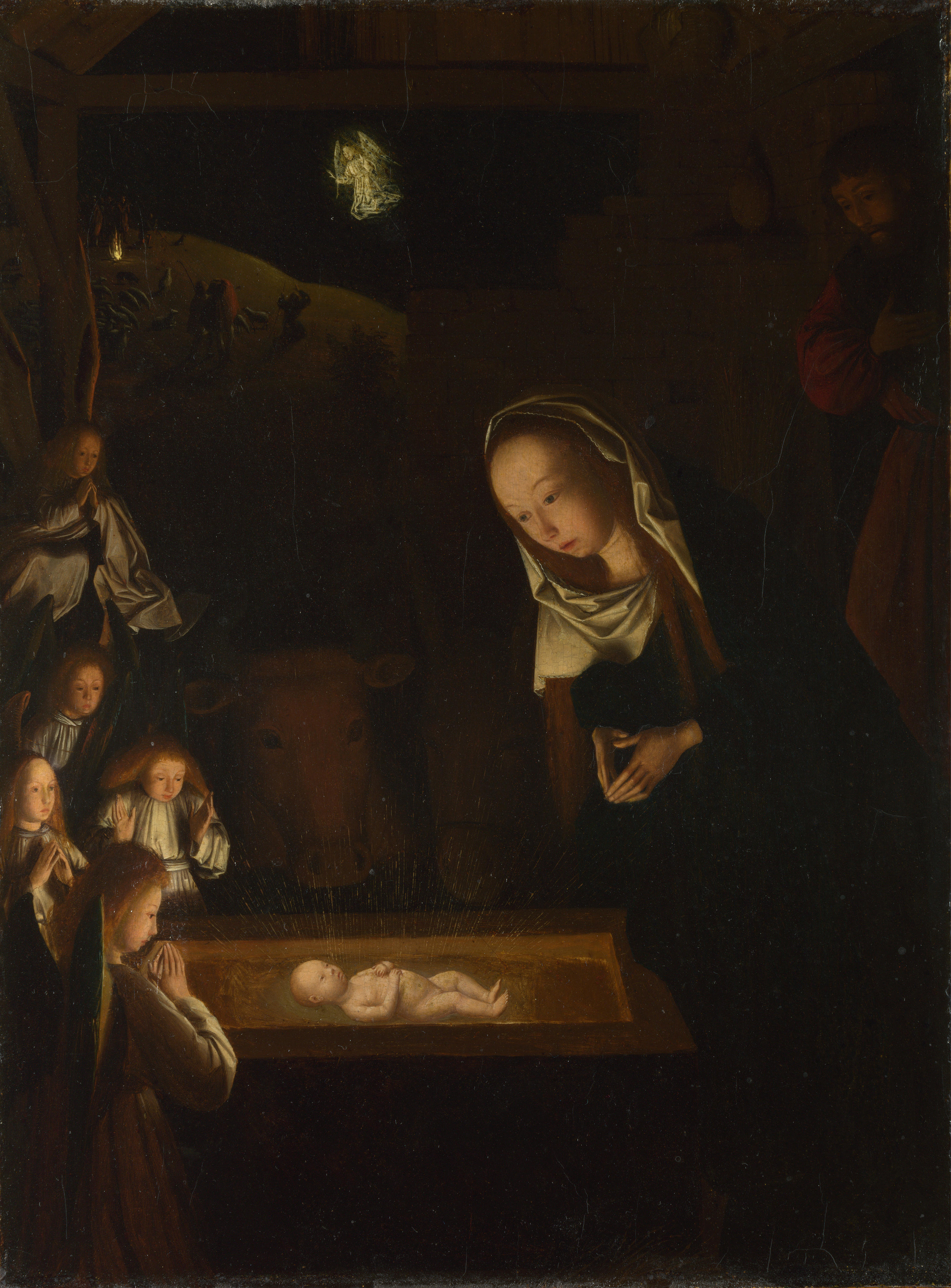
Nativity at Night by Geertgen tot Sint Jans, c. 1490.

== See also ==
- "Away in a Manger", a Christmas carol
- Bird feeder
- The Dog in the Manger, a metaphor
