= Mellieħa Bay =

Bay in Mellieħa, Malta

- Għadira Bay
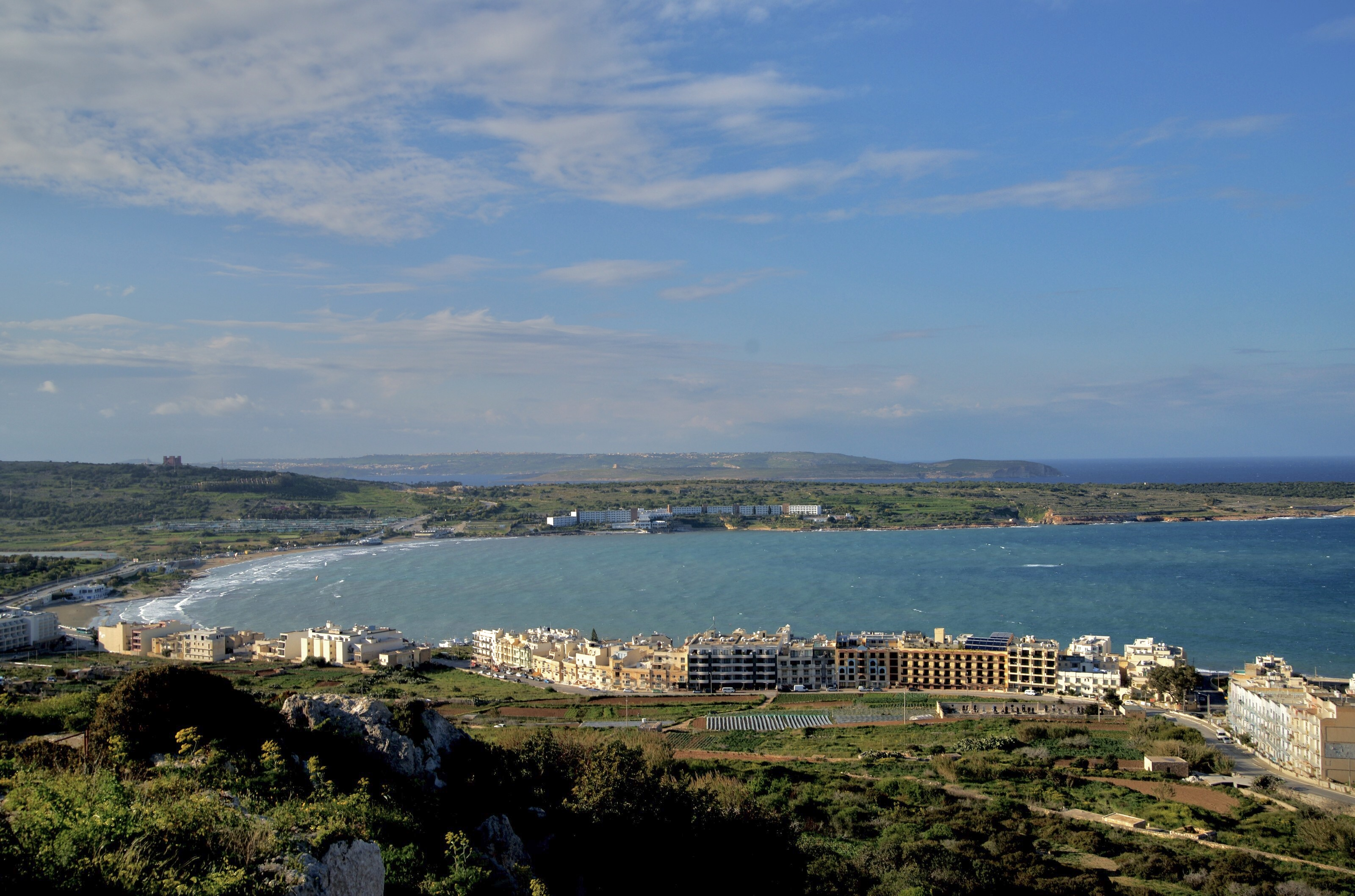
- The bay as seen from the centre of Mellieħa. Gozo and Comino can be seen in the background.

- Location of the bay in Malta
- Location: Malta
- Group: Mediterranean Sea
- Coordinates: 35°58′11.5″N 14°21′1.2″E
- Type: Bay
- Surface elevation: 0 metres (0 ft)

Mellieħa Bay (Maltese: Il-Bajja tal-Mellieħa), also known as Għadira Bay (Maltese: Il-Bajja tal-Għadira) is the largest sandy beach in Malta, located in the northern locality of Mellieħa. Shallow waters dominate the bay, and the beach stretches for over a kilometre.

== Attractions on site ==
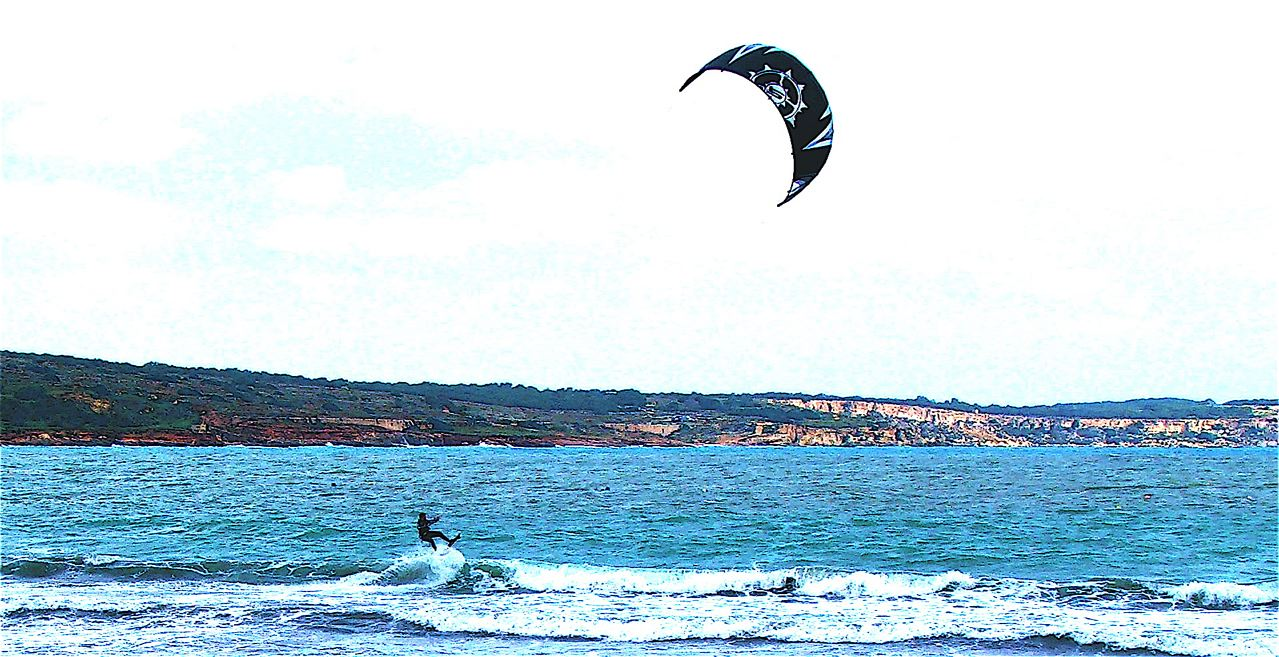
A man kitesurfing in Mellieħa Bay

The beach offers sunbeds, umbrellas, and water sports rentals, as well as a number of bars and restaurants and public restrooms. Some establishments are open 24 hours a day, hosting beach events, including discos and banquets.

Parts of the bay are dedicated to water sports, including windsurfing, diving, sailing, and sea kayaking. During the tourist season, the beach is equipped with beach football and beach volleyball courts.

== Attractions nearby ==
There are many tourist attractions in the Mellieħa Bay area, such as Saint Agatha's Tower, which offers a viewpoint over the surrounding area; the Westreme Battery, an 18th-century artillery battery; and the Sanctuary of Our Lady of Mellieħa, the oldest Marian shrine in Malta.

Next to the beach there is the Għadira Nature Reserve, dominated by protected water birds.

== Safety ==
The sea water is shallow 10–15 metres from the beach.

Lifeguards and other Malta Tourism Authority staff are present on the beach every day from June to September.

== Climate ==
Optimal weather conditions in the bay occur from May to October, when maximum air temperatures typically exceed 25 °C, and the water warms to 23 °C during the summer season. Summer is dry, sunny, and calm. Precipitation is rare.

== Transport ==
The beach is located on the road to Ċirkewwa, one of Malta's main roads. The bus Route 250's final stop is at a roundabout next to the bay.

== Gallery ==
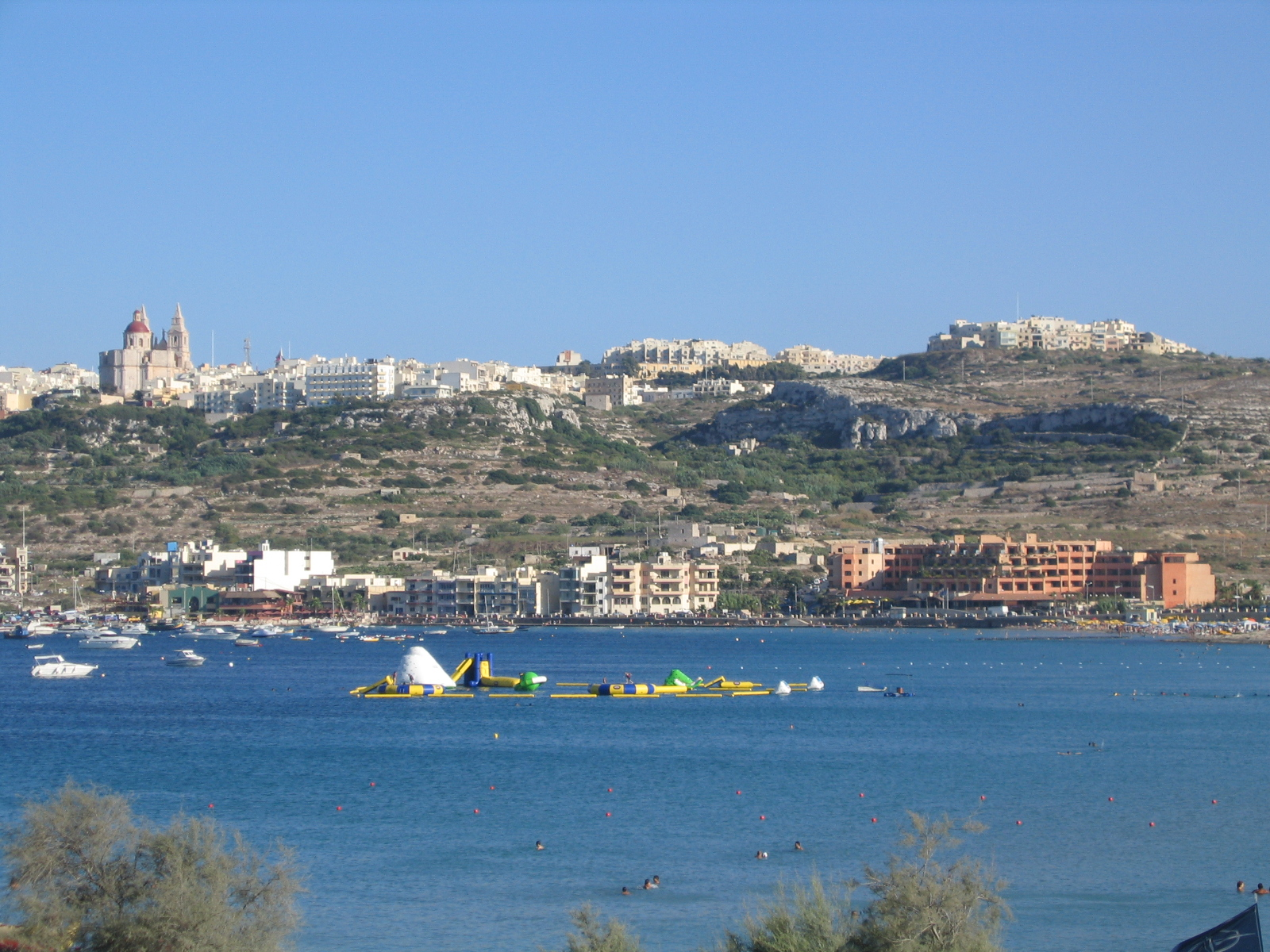
View of the bay from the northwestern side

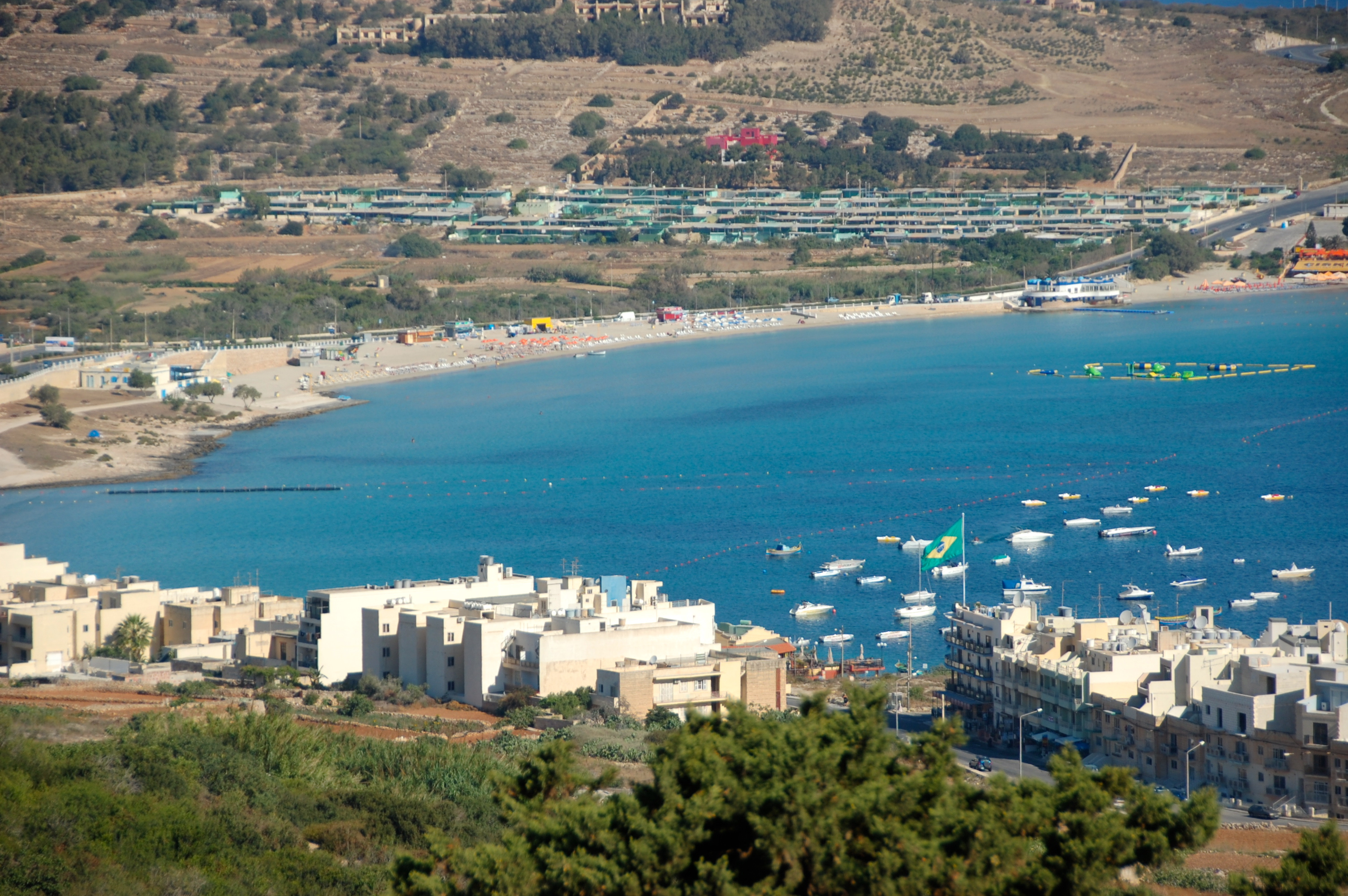
View of the bay from Mellieħa

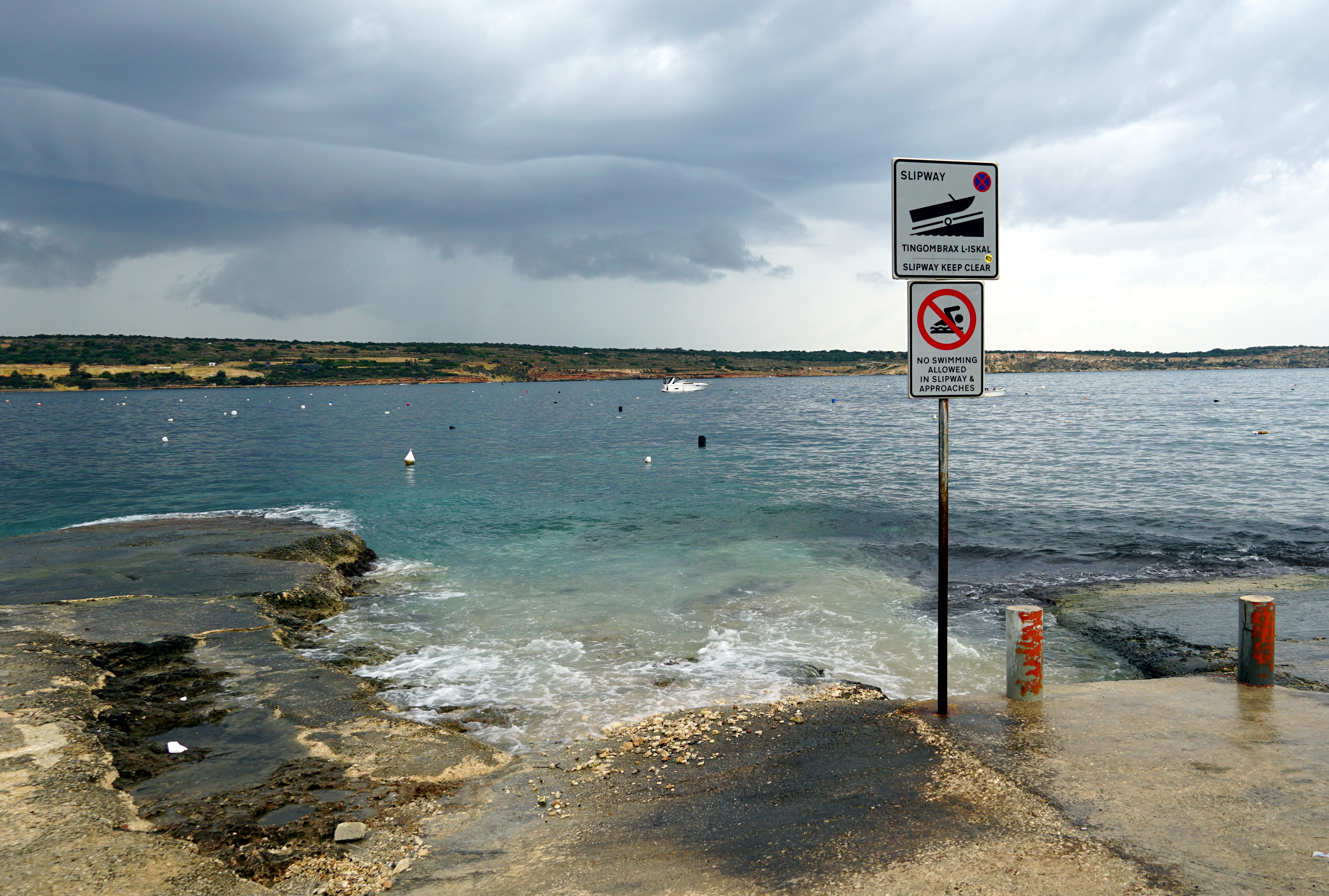
A slipway in Tunnara

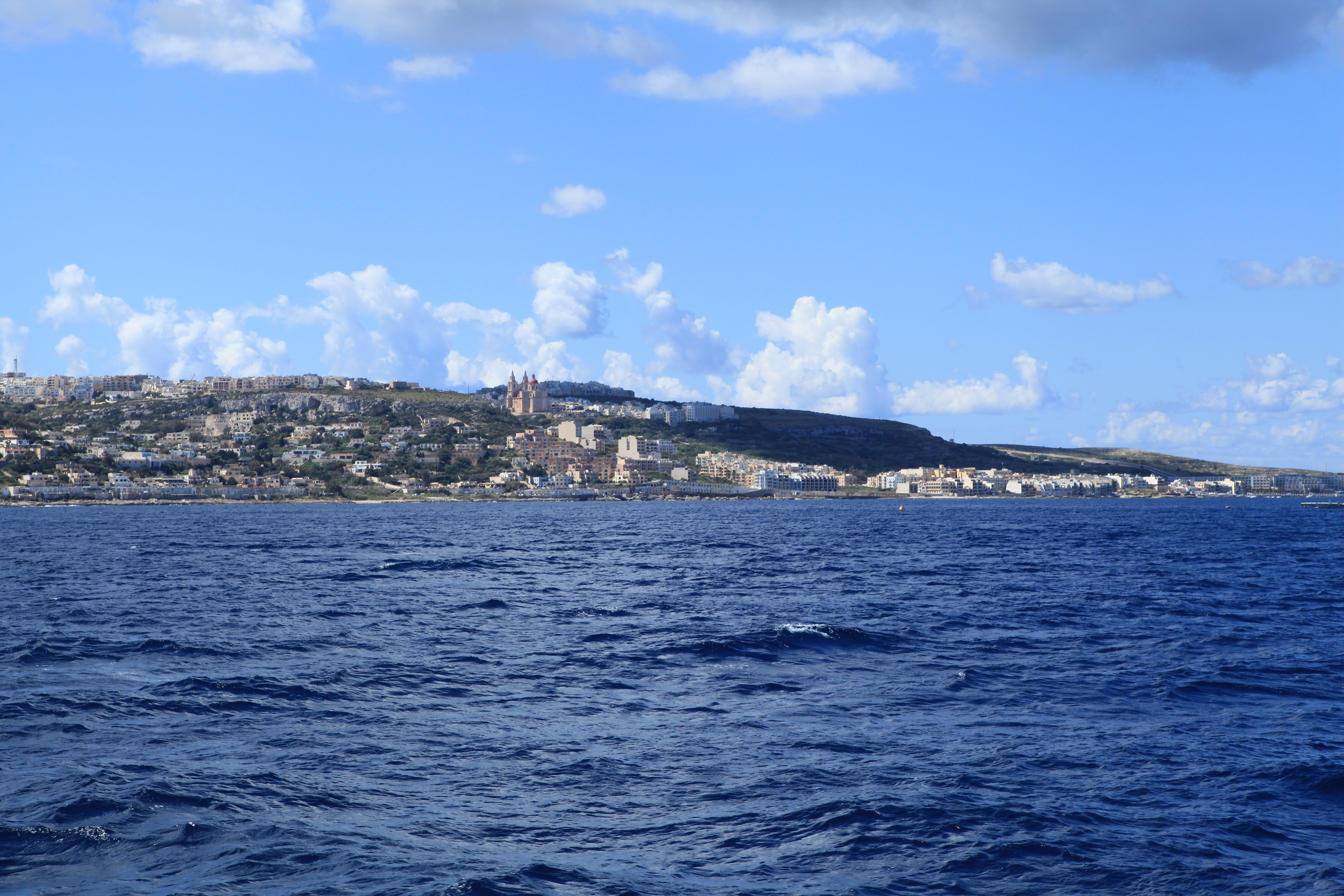

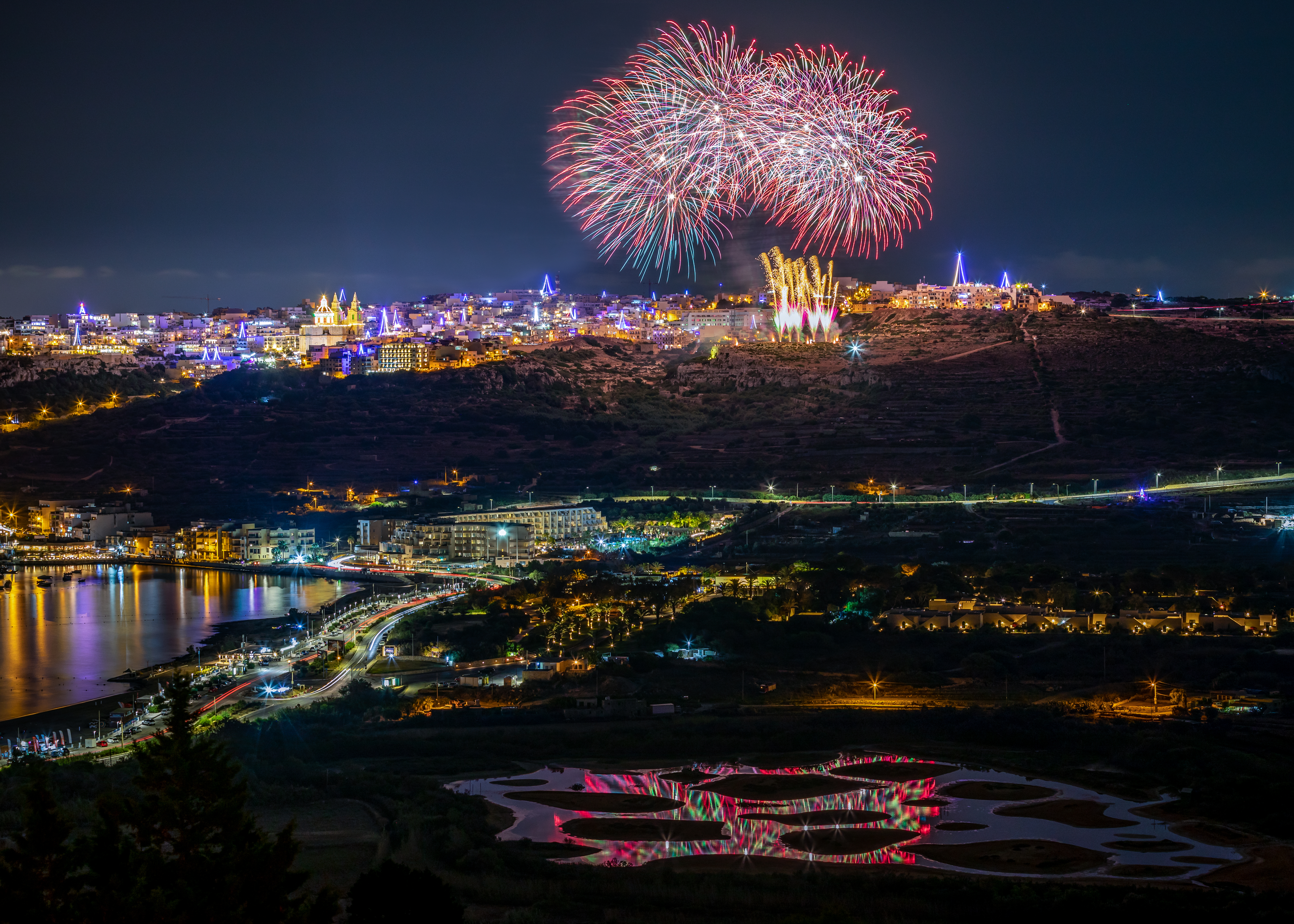
Feast of Our Lady of Victory

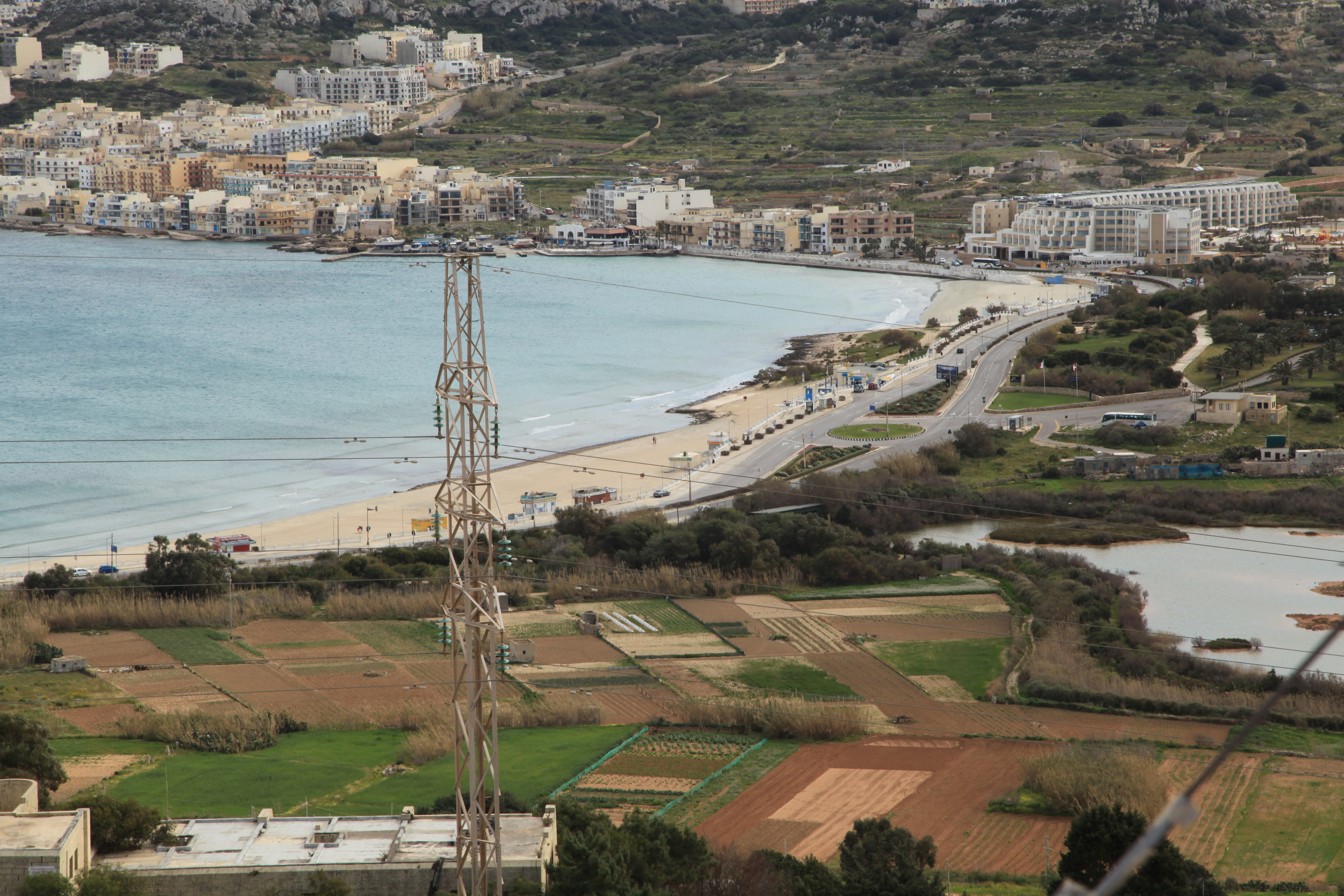
View of the bay from Saint Agatha's Tower

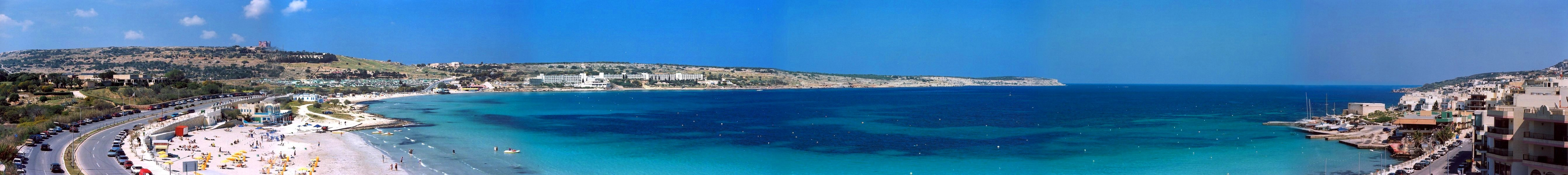
Panorama view

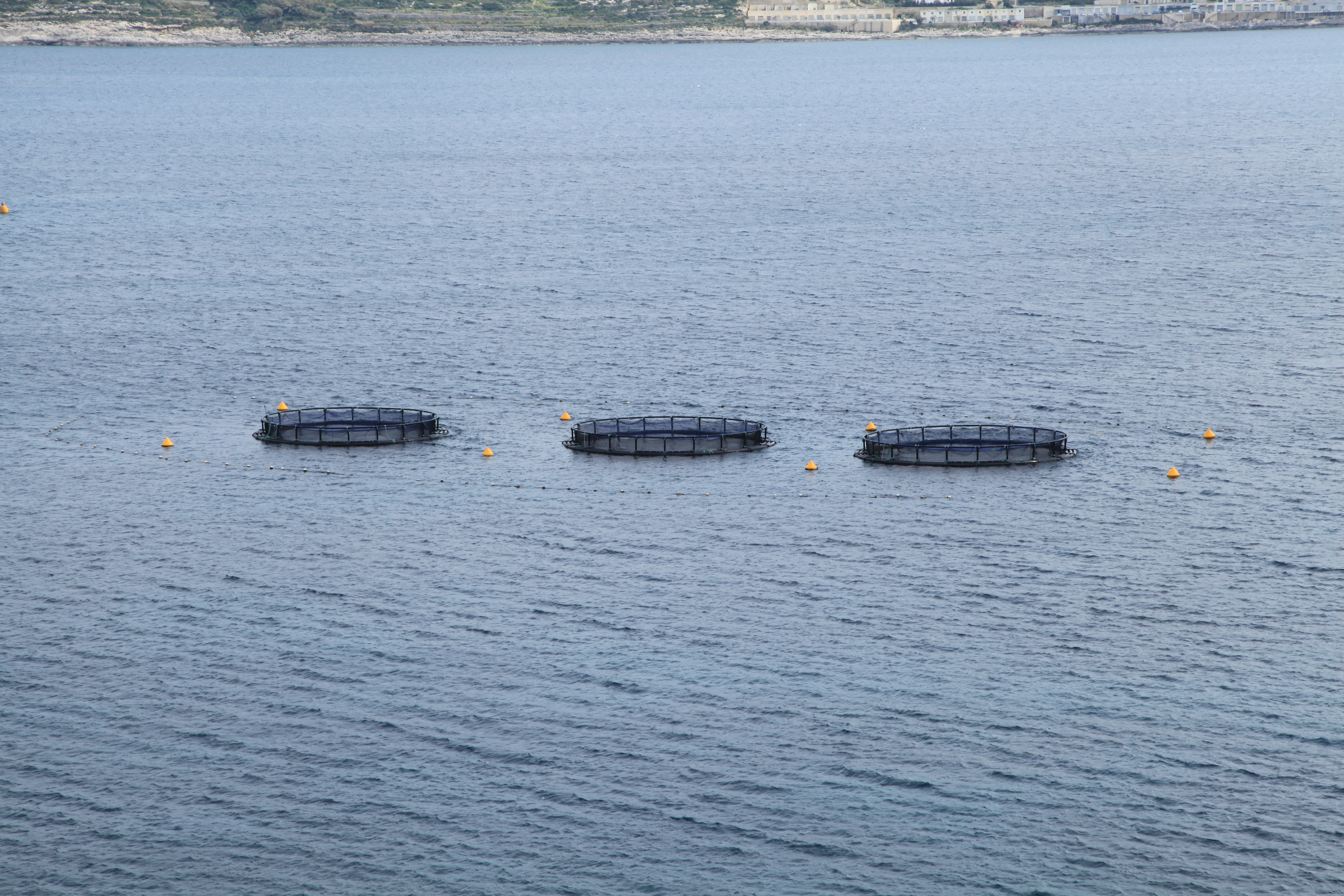
Fish farms

== See also ==
- Geography of Malta
