= The Devil's Farmhouse =

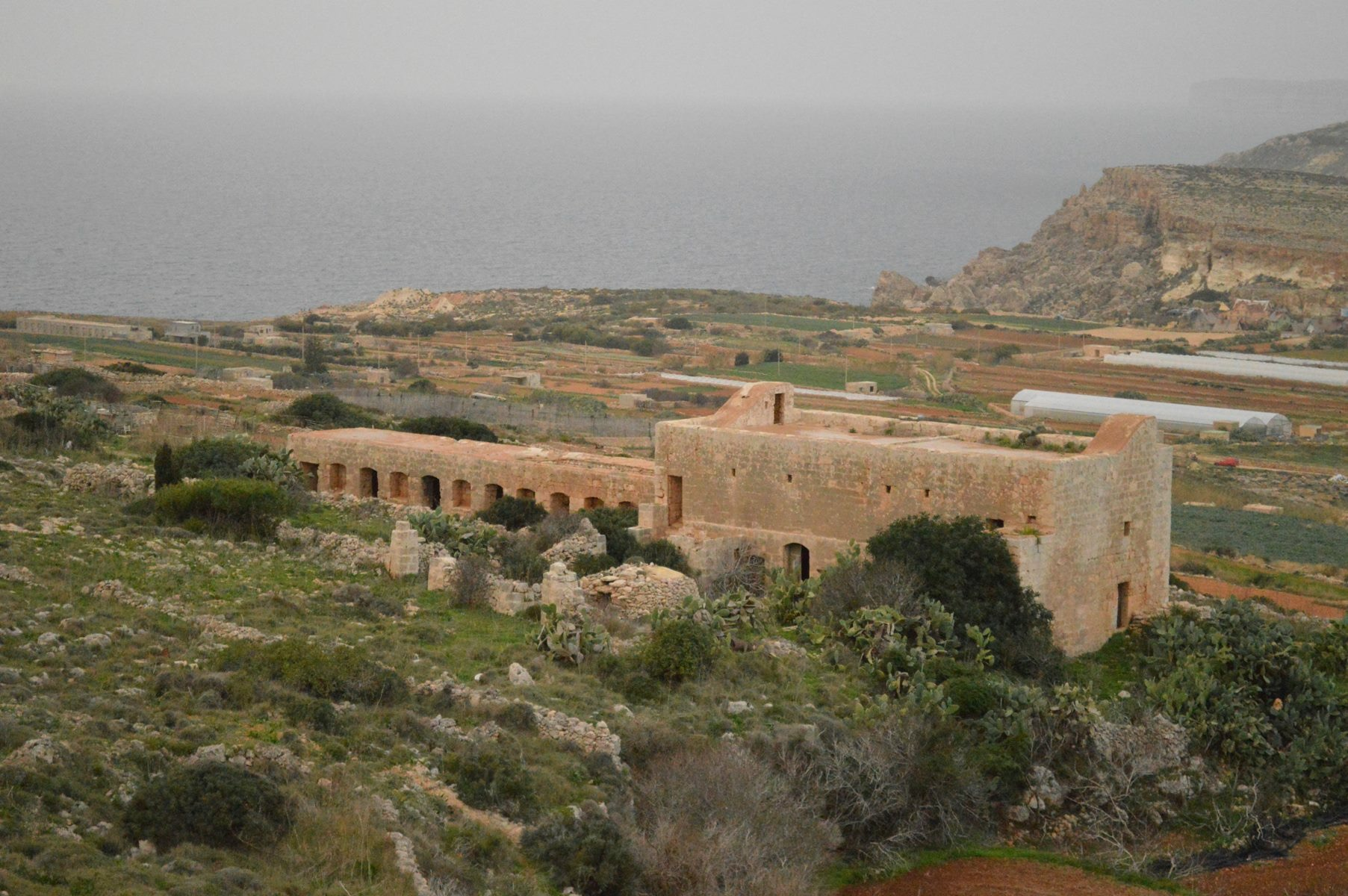
- View of The Devil's Farmhouse
- Interactive map of The Devil's Farmhouse

General information
- Status: Intact
- Type: Farmhouse; Stables; Horse-riding school
- Architectural style: Vernacular
- Location: Mellieha, Malta
- Coordinates: 35°57′21″N 14°20′59″E
- Named for: The devil
- Completed: 18th century
- Owner: Government of Malta

Technical details
- Material: Limestone
- Floor count: 1

The Devil's Farmhouse, also known in Maltese as Ir-Razzett tax-Xitan, and officially as Ir-Razzett Tax-Xjaten (The Farmhouse of the Devils or The Devils' Farmhouse), is an 18th-century farmhouse in Mellieħa, Malta. The farmhouse features two unconnected buildings. The original scope for the buildings was to function as stables and a horse-riding school (Cavalerizza).

At one point, the buildings were converted into farmhouses by different farmers, and underwent some structural changes. A Maltese myth claims that the farmhouse was built by the devil, a tale from which it derives its historic name. It is a national monument and in a dilapidated state.

== History ==
The Devil's Farmhouse was built in the 18th century during the rule of the Knights of Malta to be used as a horse stable. It is found in Ta' Randa very close to L-Għar ta' Zamberat (Zamberat's Cave). The farmhouse stands away from urban development in isolation. Attributed to the farmhouse is a myth that the farmhouse was built by the devil/s in one/three-day/s The only architectural feature that gives the impression of relating to demonic icons are the two enclosed staircases, that lead to the roof of the stable, which are suggested to appear as two horns.

There is also a traditional carnival song/poem that mentions Ta' Randa and the devil. The song (or poem) named Il-Karnival goes to say as the following:

Għax illum il-Karnival

Għax il-festa tax-xitan
Ix-xitan irid ikanta
Għandu denbu daqs ta' Randa.

Very roughly translated, this text announces the feast of the devil at the site.

== Architecture ==
The building has a simple and modest vernacular architecture, with slit windows, that function as ventilators, and waterspouts. It has no inscriptions or symbols to shed further information about its use apart from Roman numerals that were inscribed when it was converted to a farmhouse. These are found on the walls and woods, and record the sale of different types of vegetables by farmers. The features of the building are examples of Maltese traditional architecture that include roofs built with limestone slabs and animal feeding mangers. Despite the conversion to a farmhouse, the building clearly does not look like it was originally meant to be one, as it is not a traditional Maltese farmhouse. This and the position of the mangers prove that the building was built for horses. These characteristics may suggest that the building may have been a cow farm. The high roof of one of the buildings still prove that it is unlikely it was originally a cow farm, but it may be speculative to say that at one point it had been so.

It features two separate unconnected buildings, which may have been built during different periods. At the site, within the front of the farmhouse, stand two traditional giren which were built for bird hunting. The building was used as a hunting lodge and as a horse-riding school (Cavalerizza) by the knights to keep their horses inside. Other later additions inside the building are the wooden beams that were introduced to support the limestone slabs. The farmhouse is in a dilapidated state and is in need of restoration. Some of the roofs already collapsed while other are expected to collapse.

== Cultural Heritage ==
The farmhouse is a national monument of architectural significance. The Malta Environment and Planning Authority scheduled it as a Grade 1 National Monument, that protects it from being demolished, altered or further developed but allows the reconstruction of damaged parts. The building is listed as part of the National Inventory of the Cultural Property of the Maltese Islands (NICPMI).

== Gallery ==
The Devil's Farmhouse
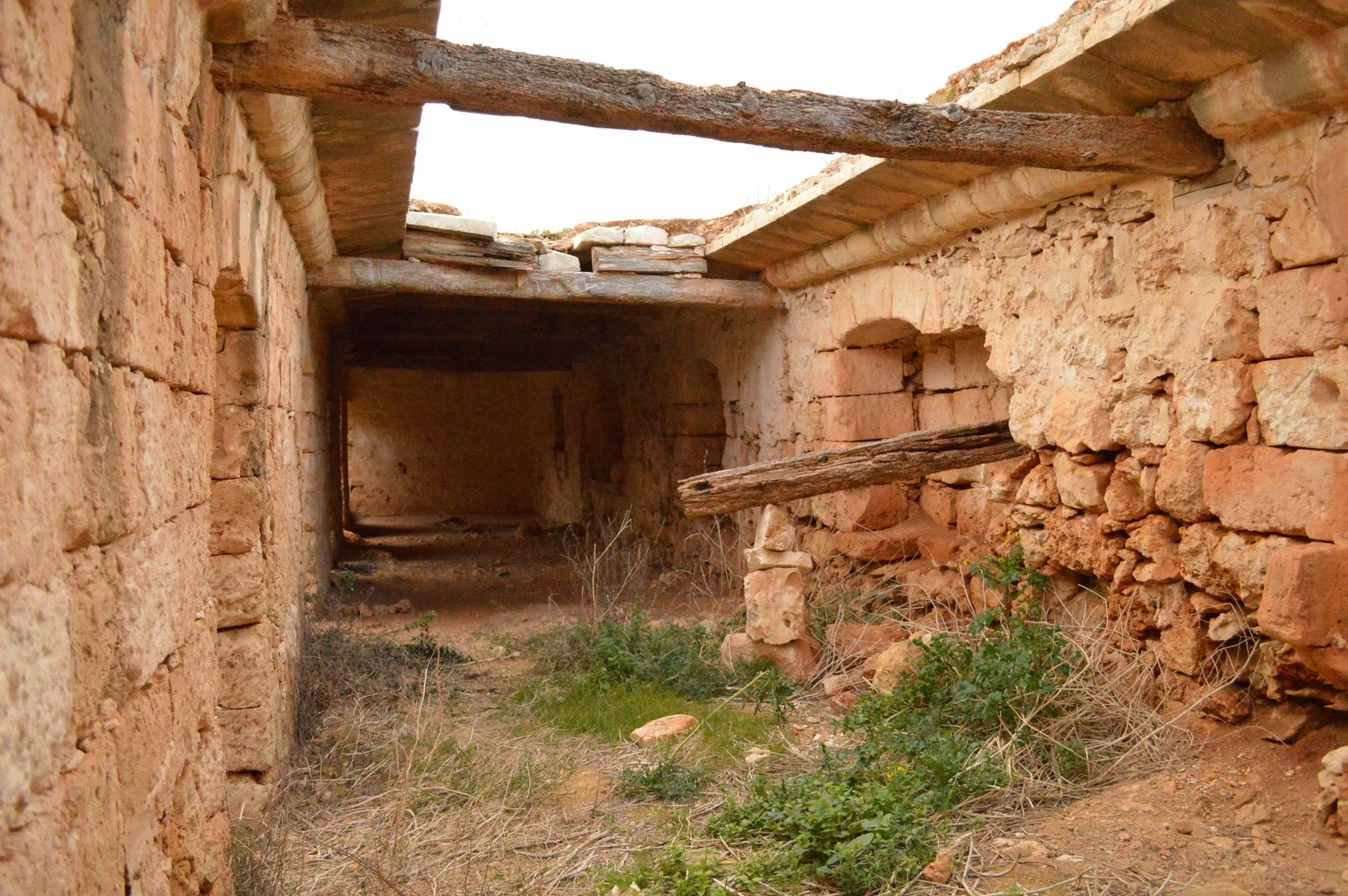
Collapsed roof

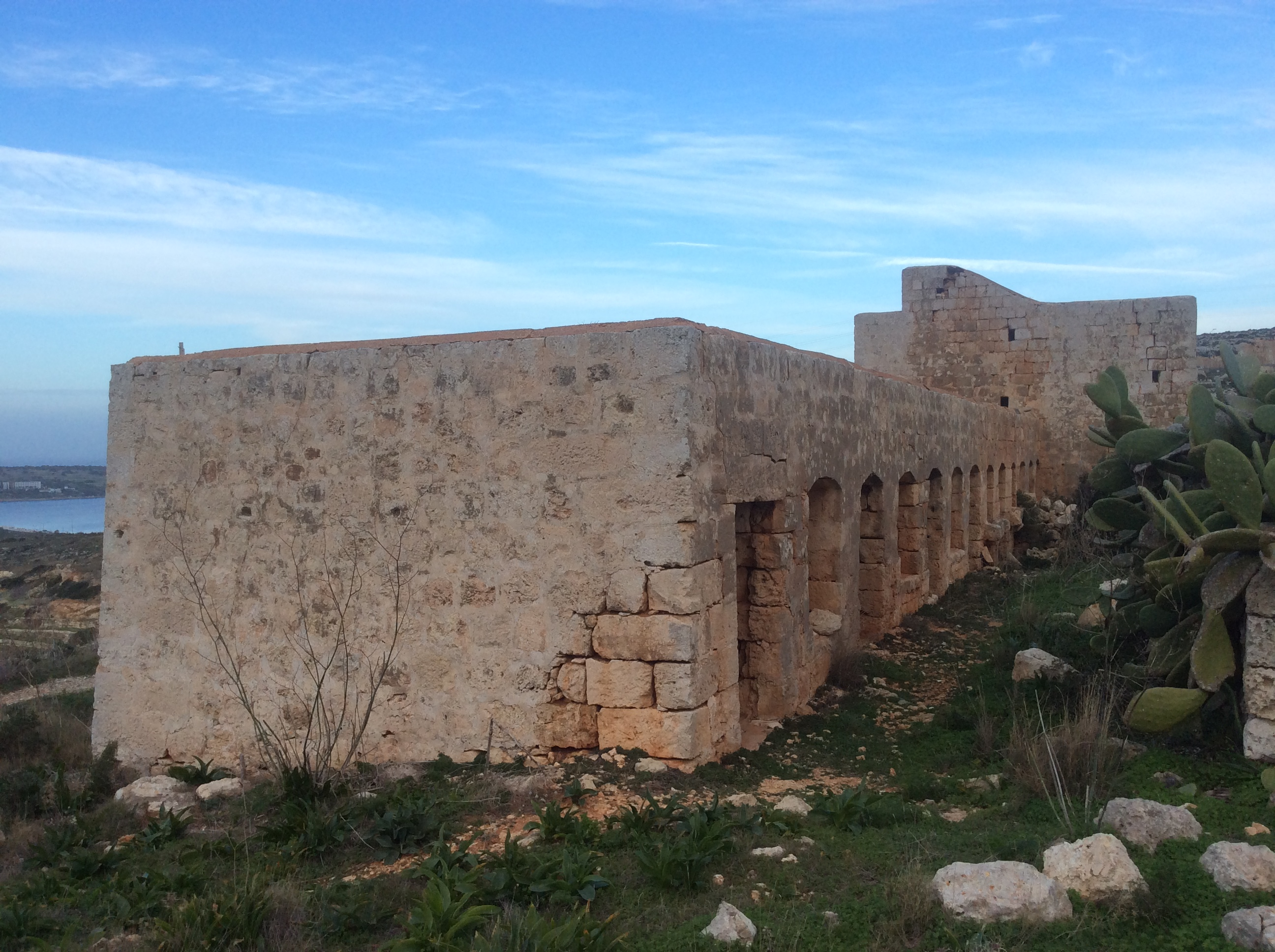
The animal's feeding quarters

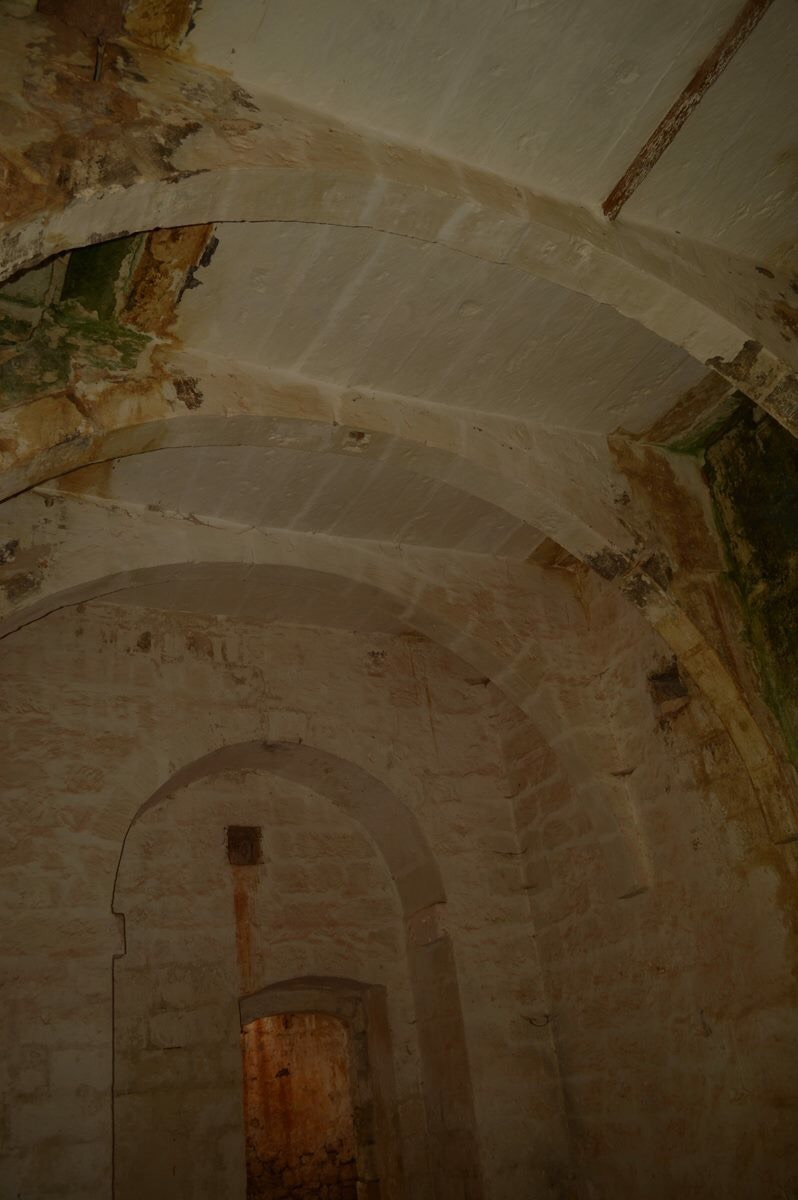
The arched ceiling

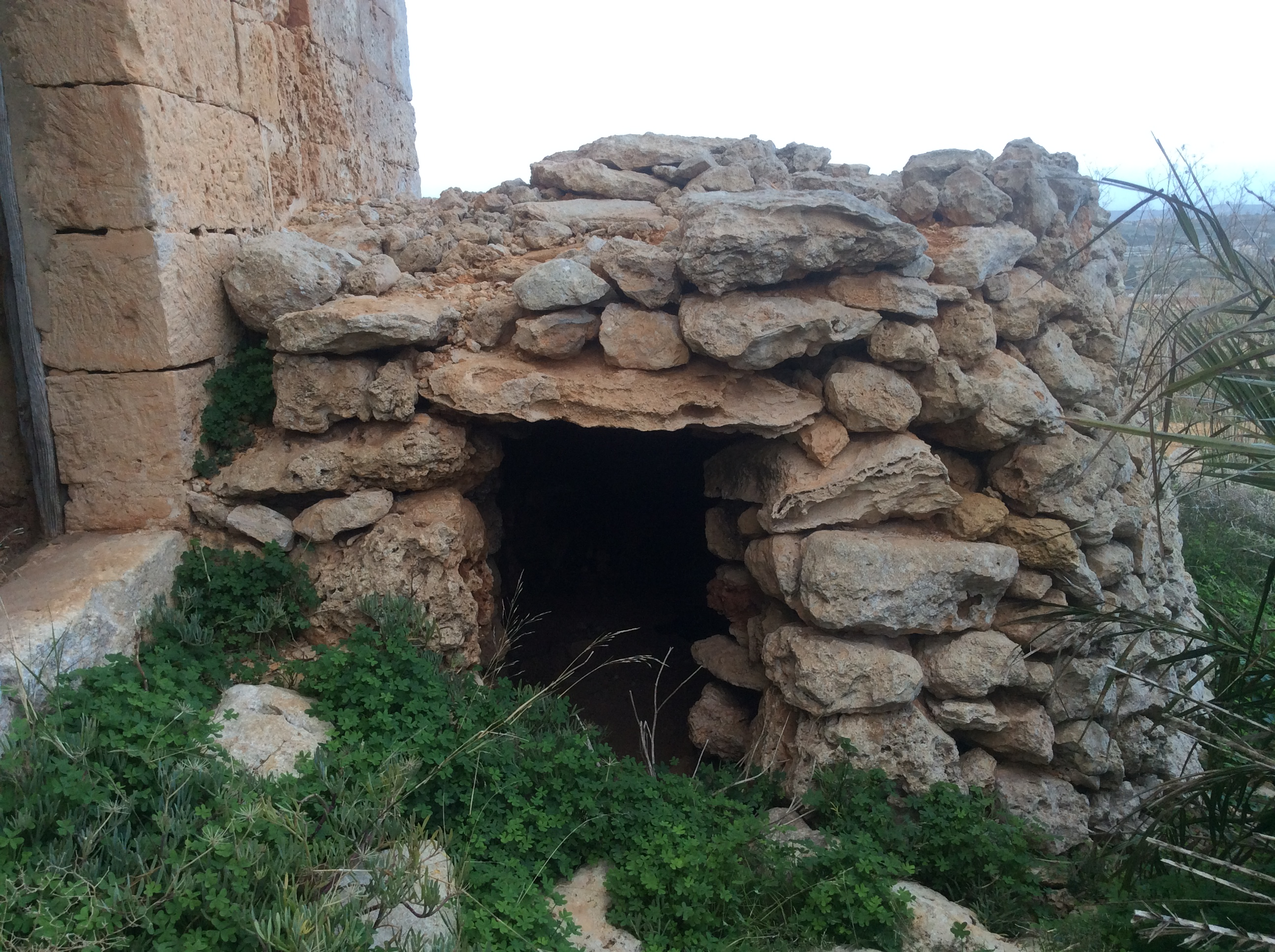
The girna at the side of the farmhouse

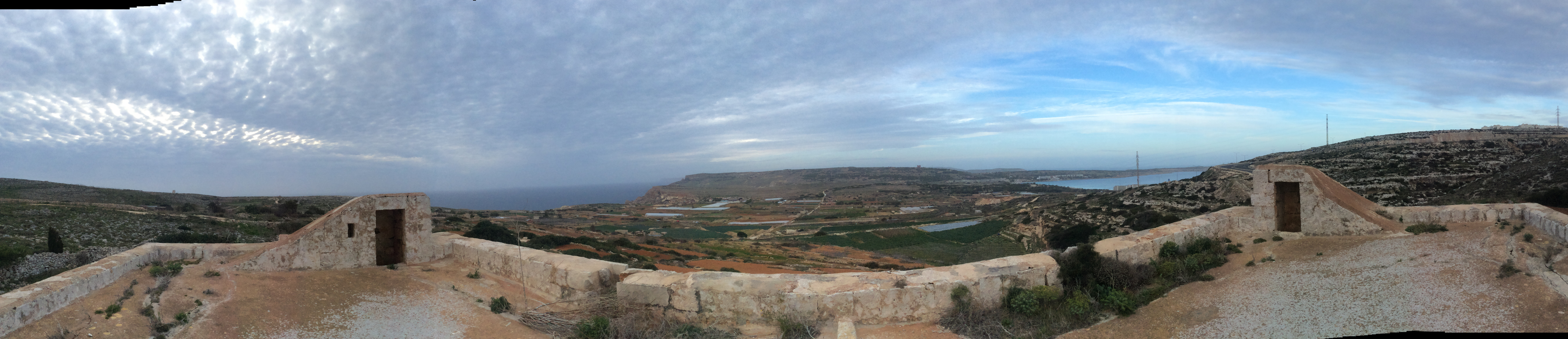
A view from the farmhouse and the two staircases that are said to appear as horns

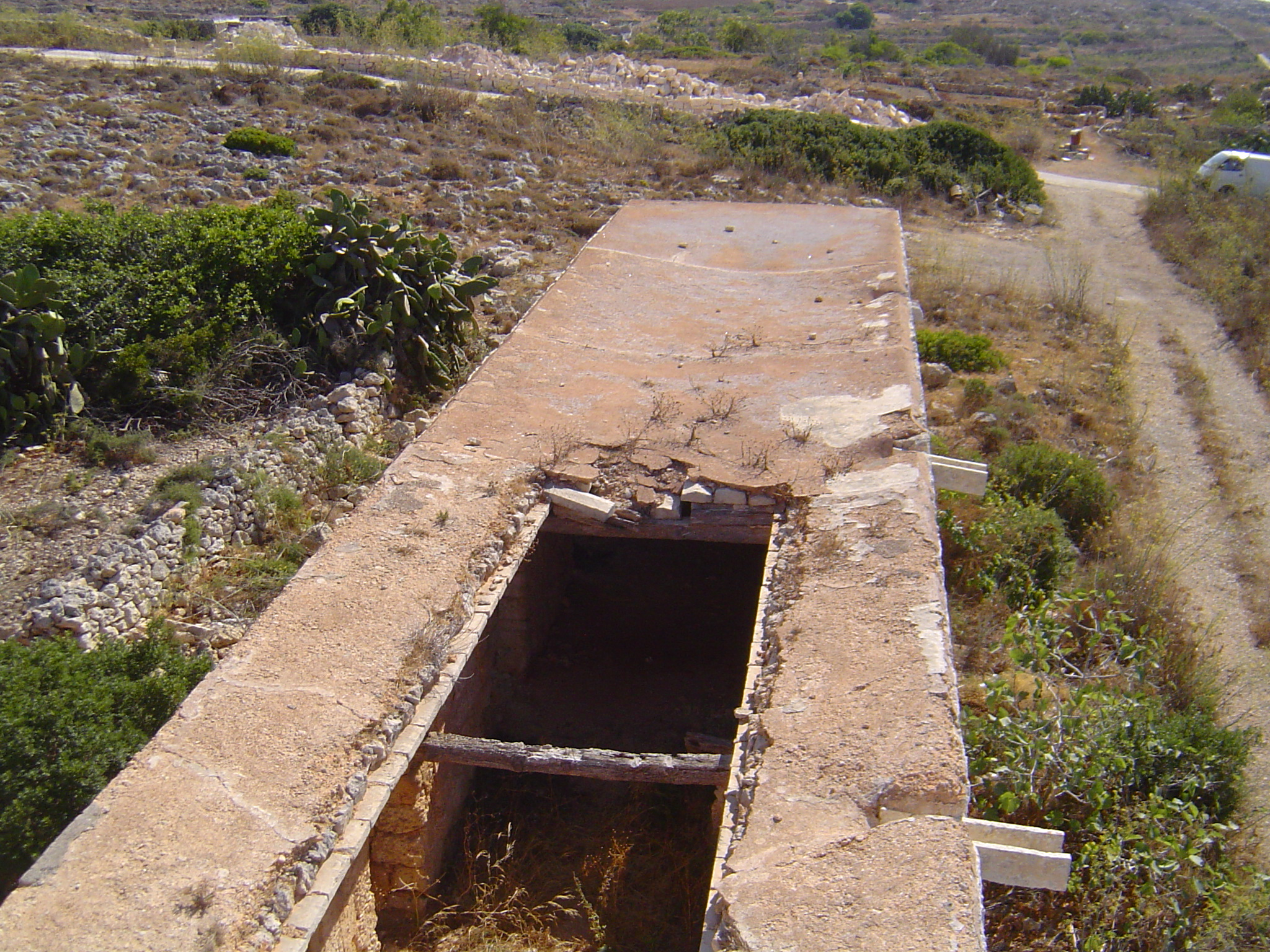

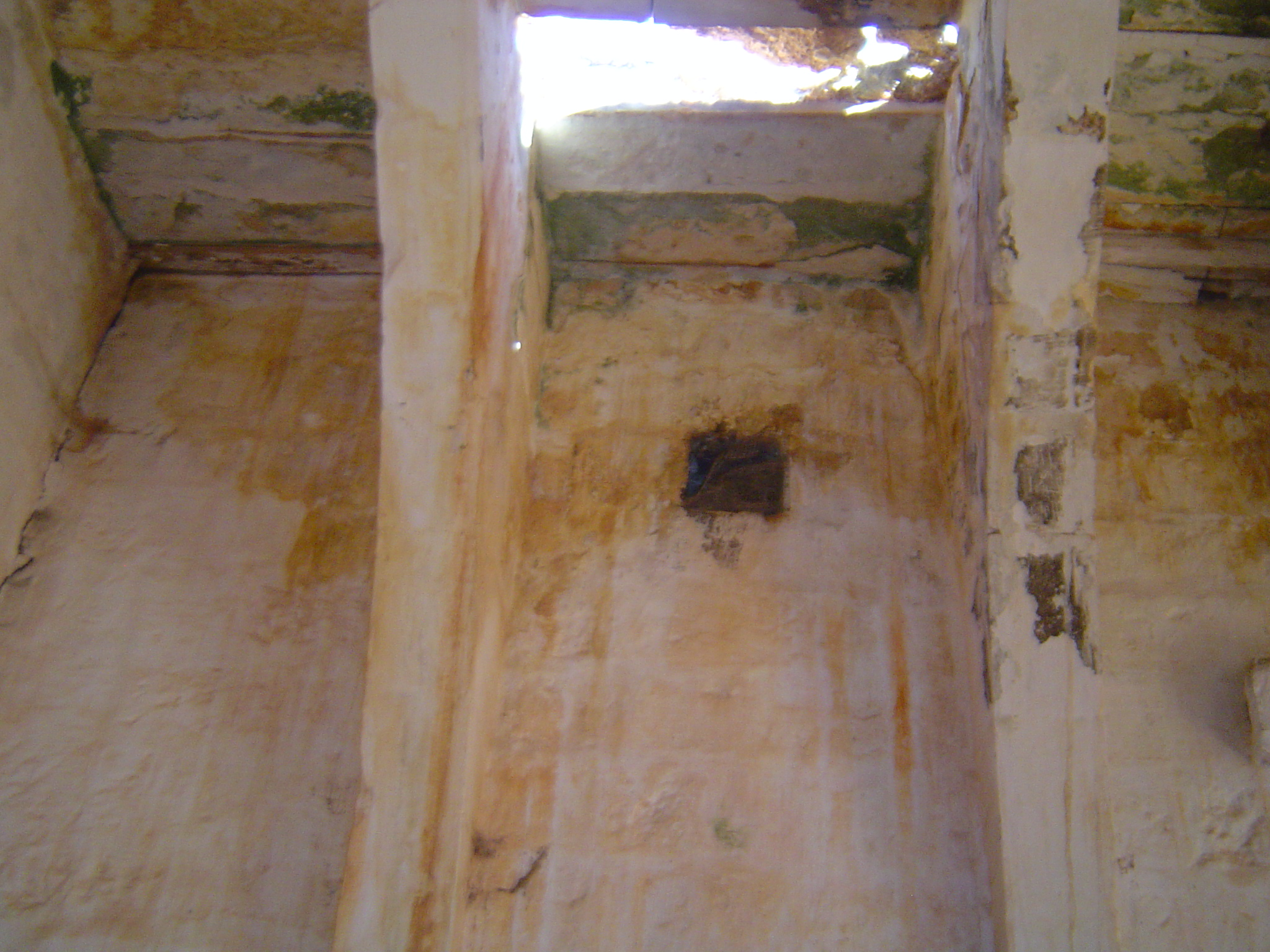

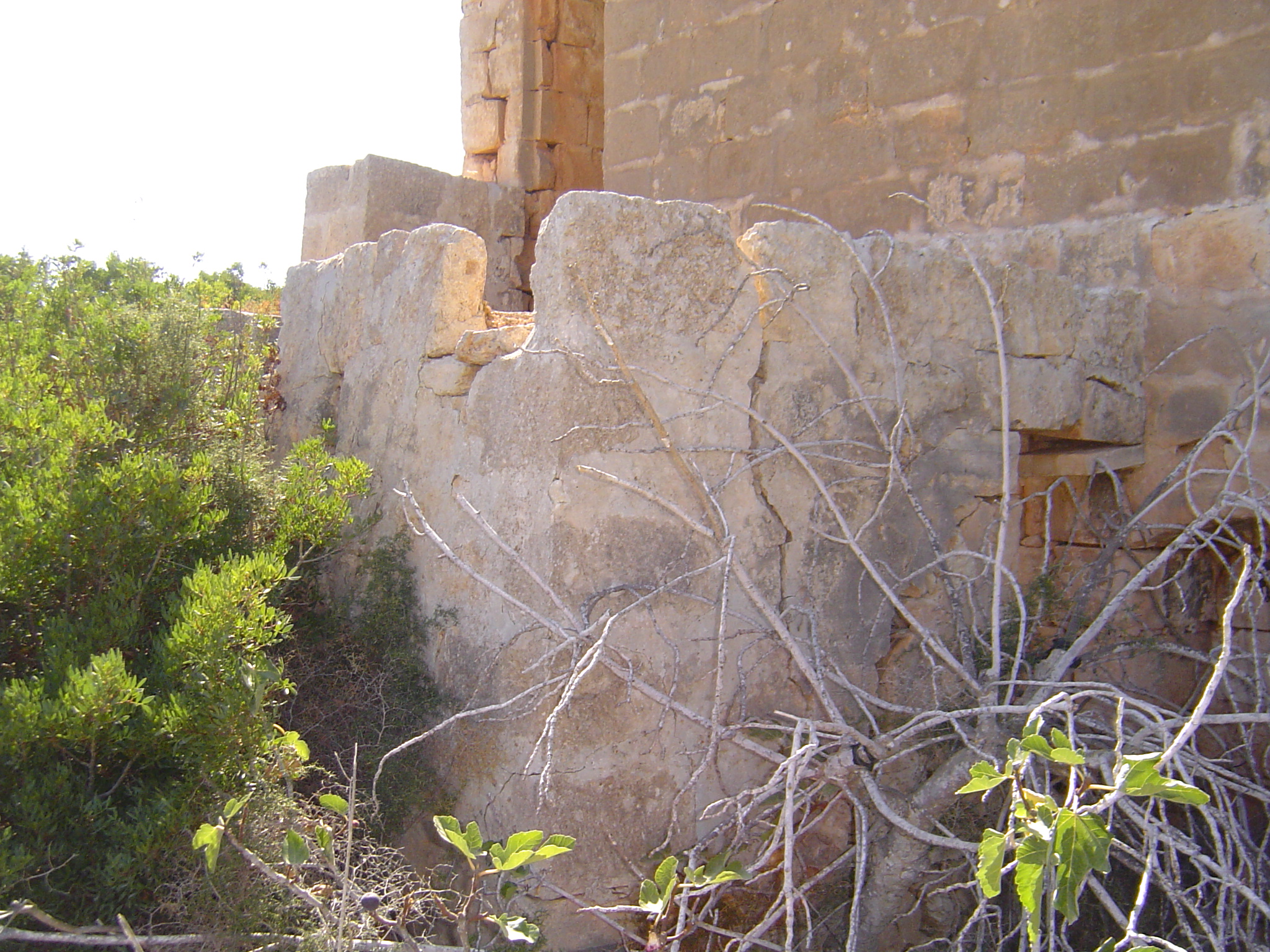

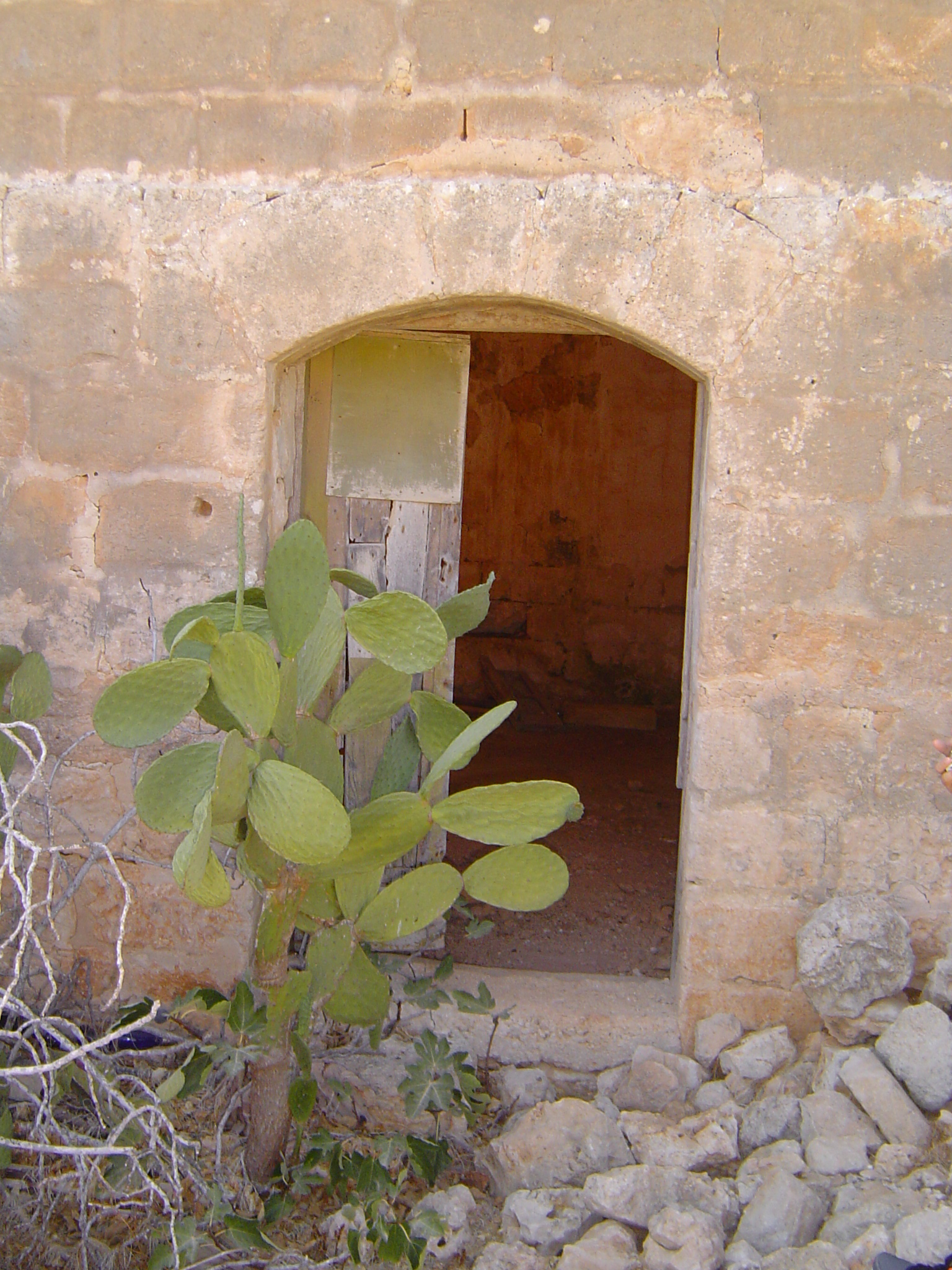

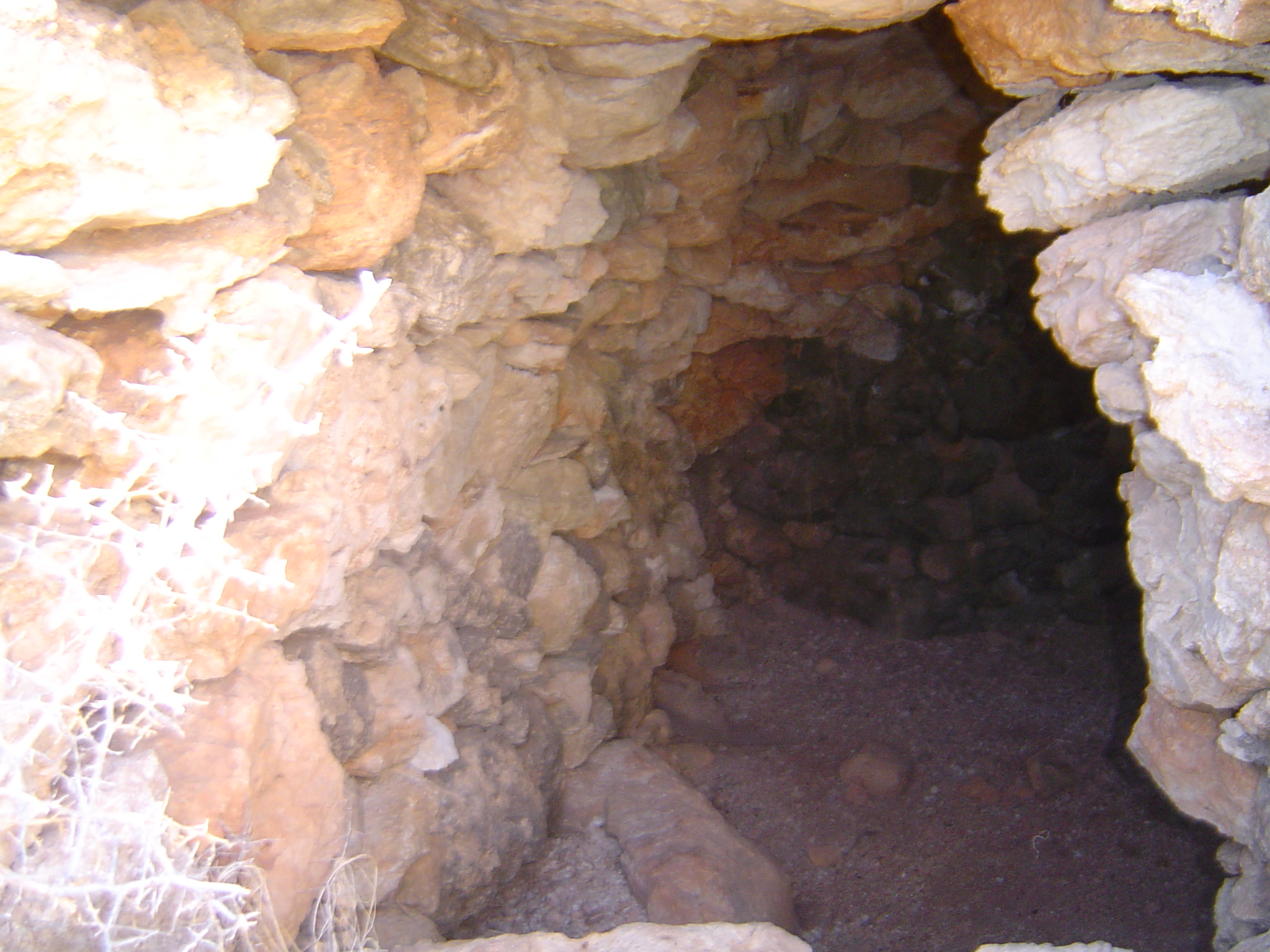

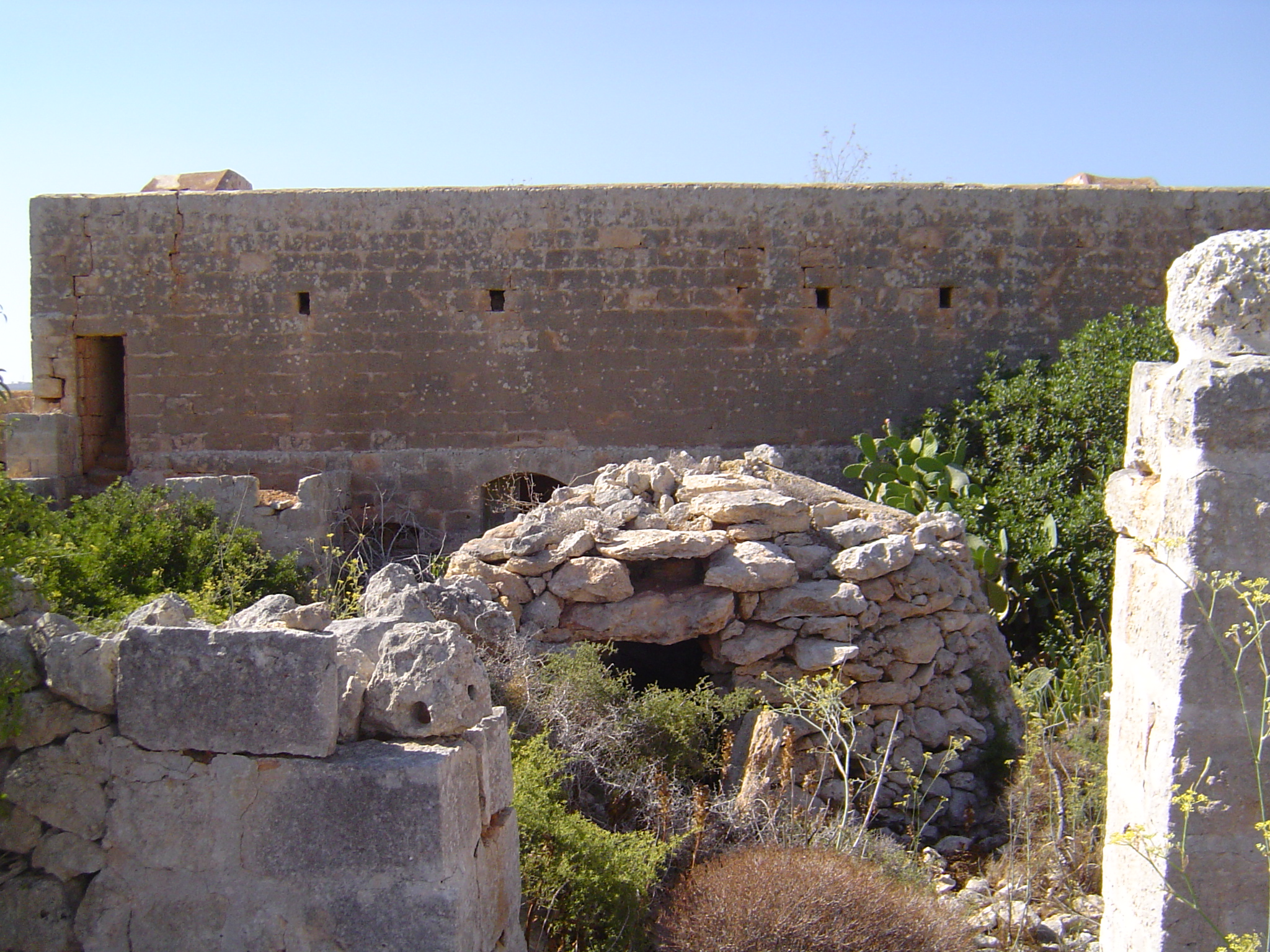

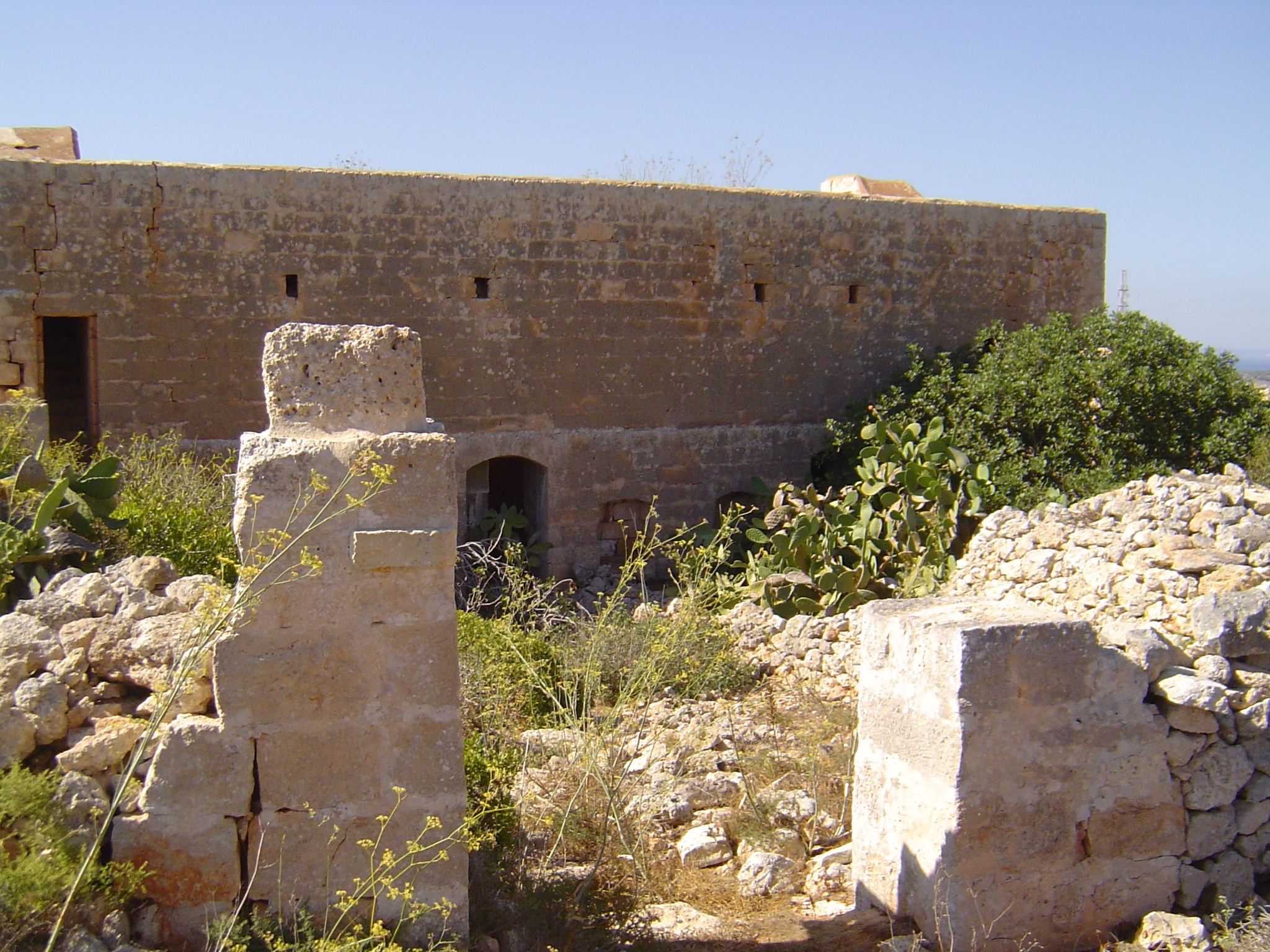

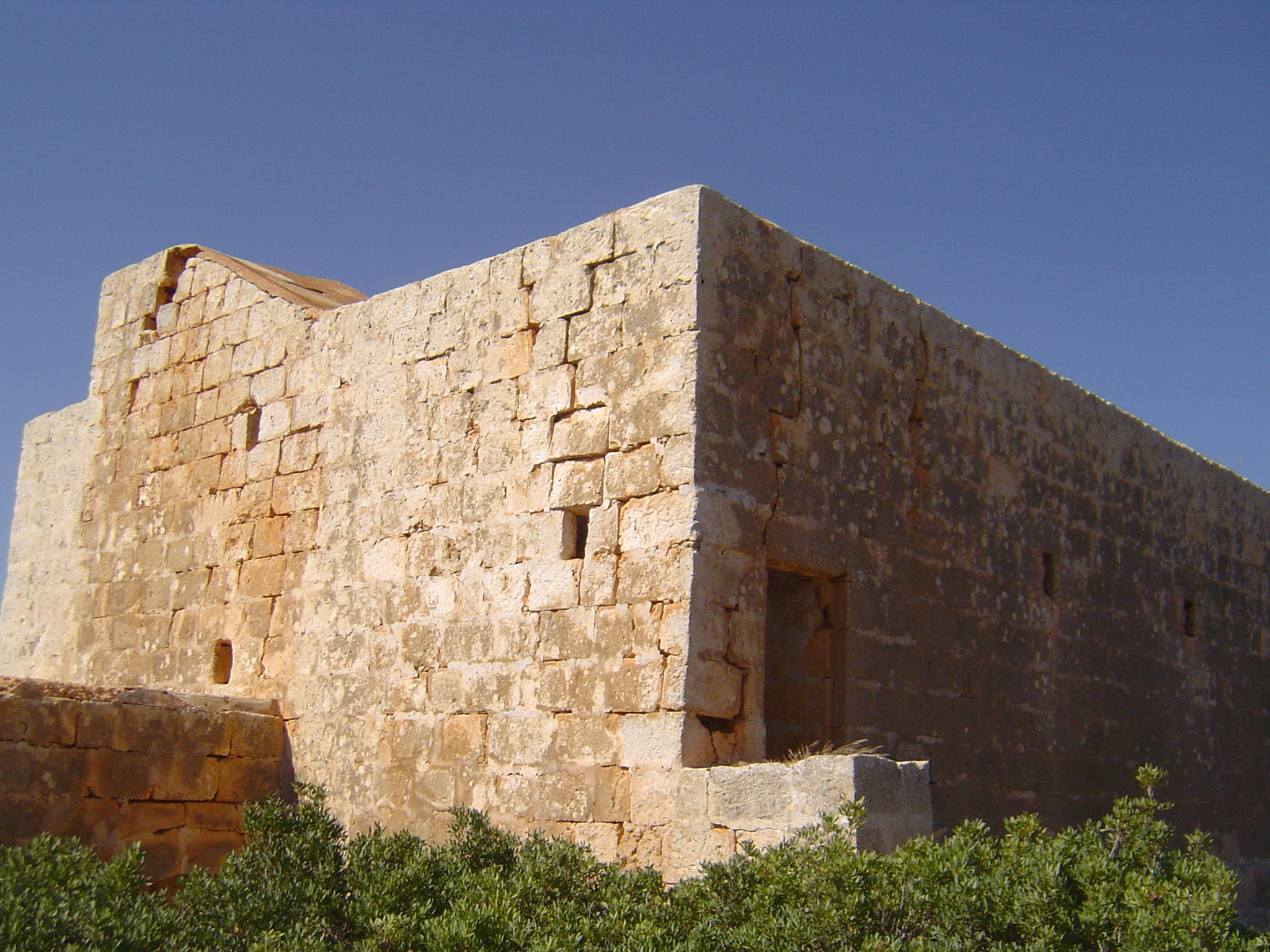

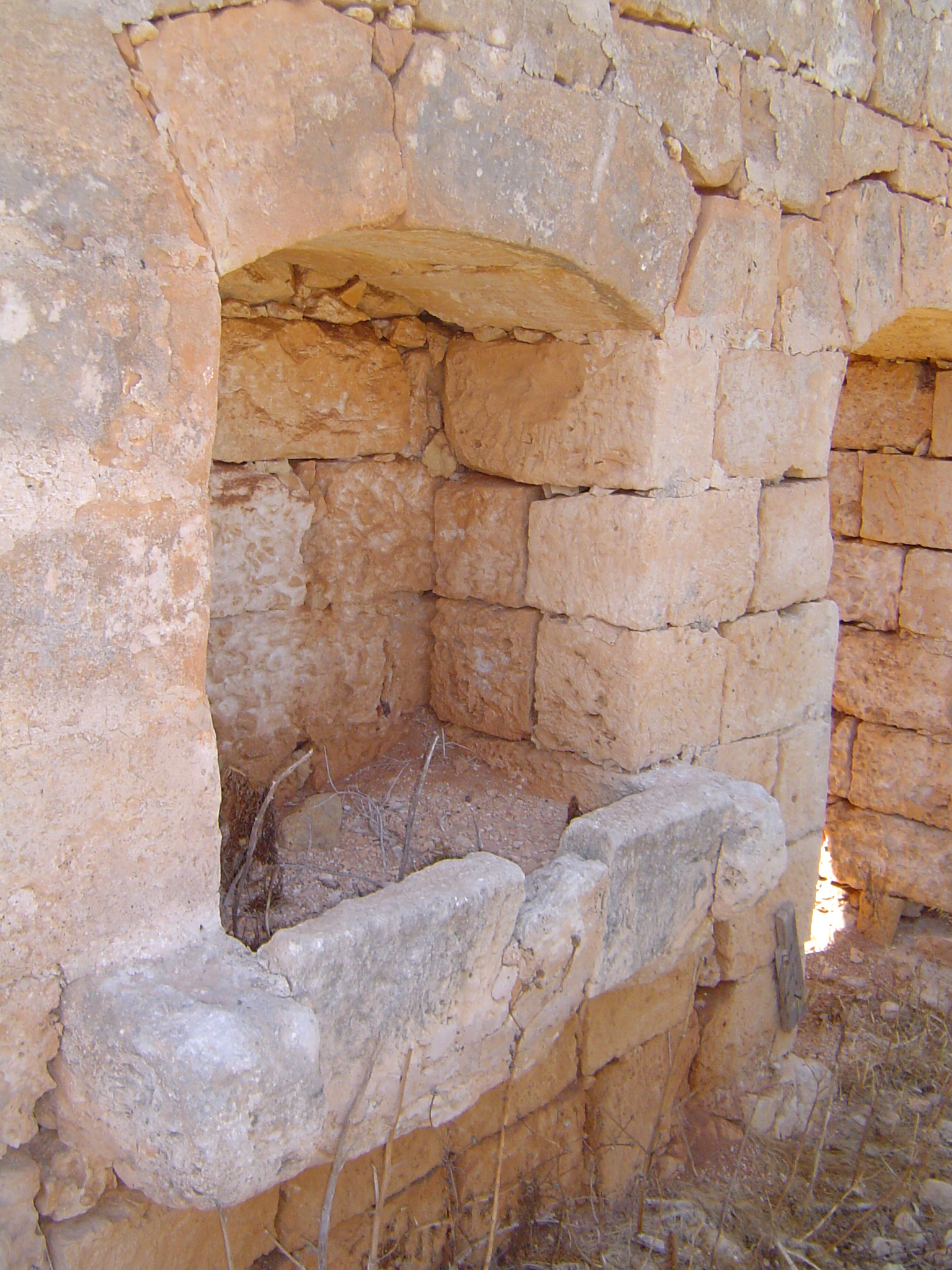

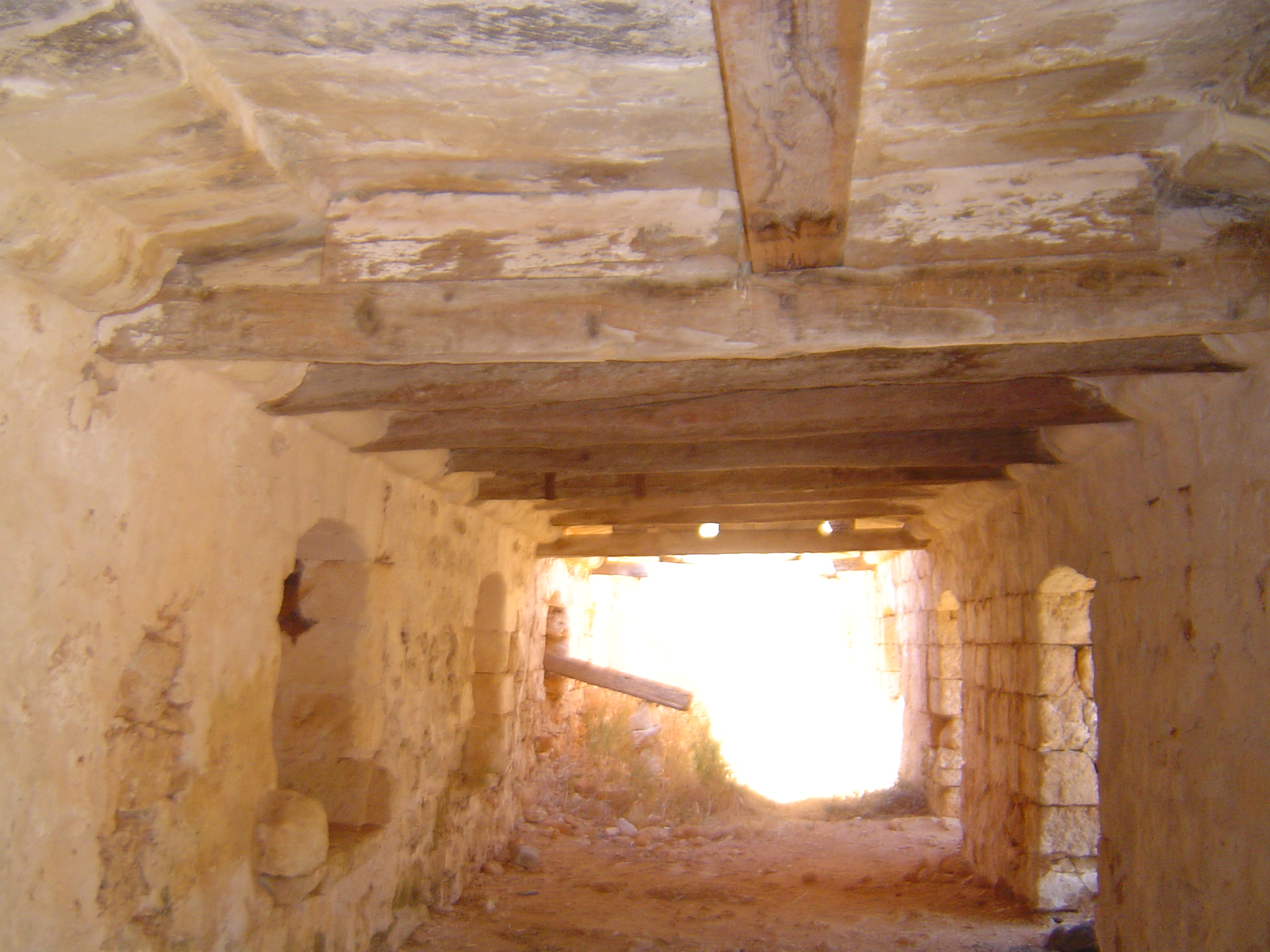

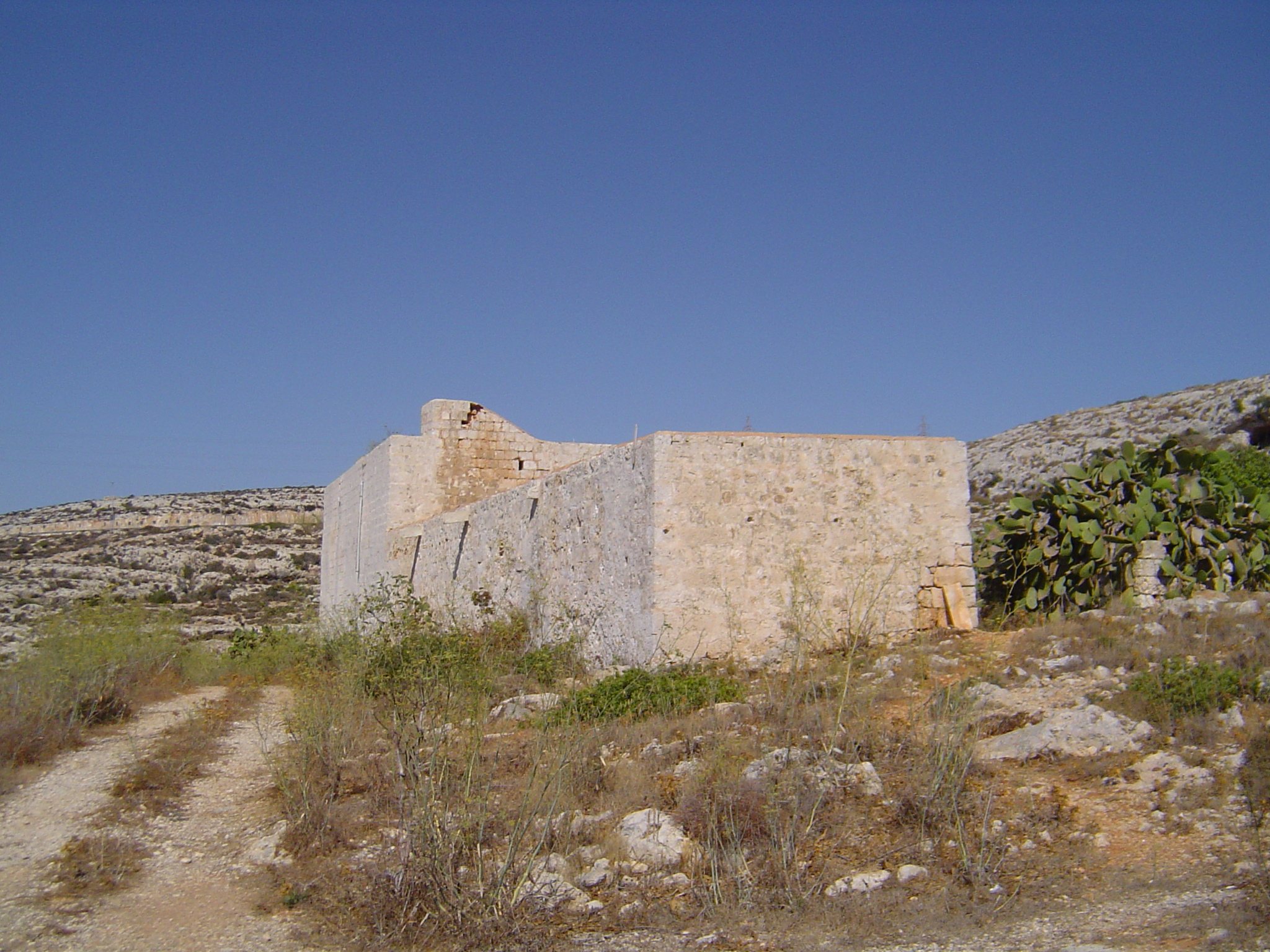
