= Fort Mellieħa =

- Il-Fortizza tal-Mellieħa
- Mellieħa, Malta

Site information
- Type: Fort
- Owner: Government of Malta
- Controlled by: Mellieħa Scout Group
- Condition: Intact

Location
- Coordinates: 35°57′19.3″N 14°21′55″E

Site history
- Built: 1940s
- Built by: British Empire
- Battles/wars: World War II

Fort Mellieħa or Mellieħa Fort (Maltese: Il-Fortizza tal-Mellieħa), also known as Il-Fortizza tas-Salib (meaning Fort of the Cross), is a World War II-era fort in Mellieħa, Malta. It was built by the British on top of Mellieħa Hill, to serve as a civil defence depot and an observation post. The structure is lightly fortified by a perimeter wall.

The fort is now surrounded by residential buildings. Lack of upkeep had affected the structure when, on December 28 1991, the Lands Department leased it to the Mellieħa Scout Group, who restored the building, and now use it as their headquarters. It is the largest scouts headquarters in Malta, and includes kitchens, dormitories, a campsite and underground shelters.
