= Feeder (livestock equipment) =

Container of food for livestock

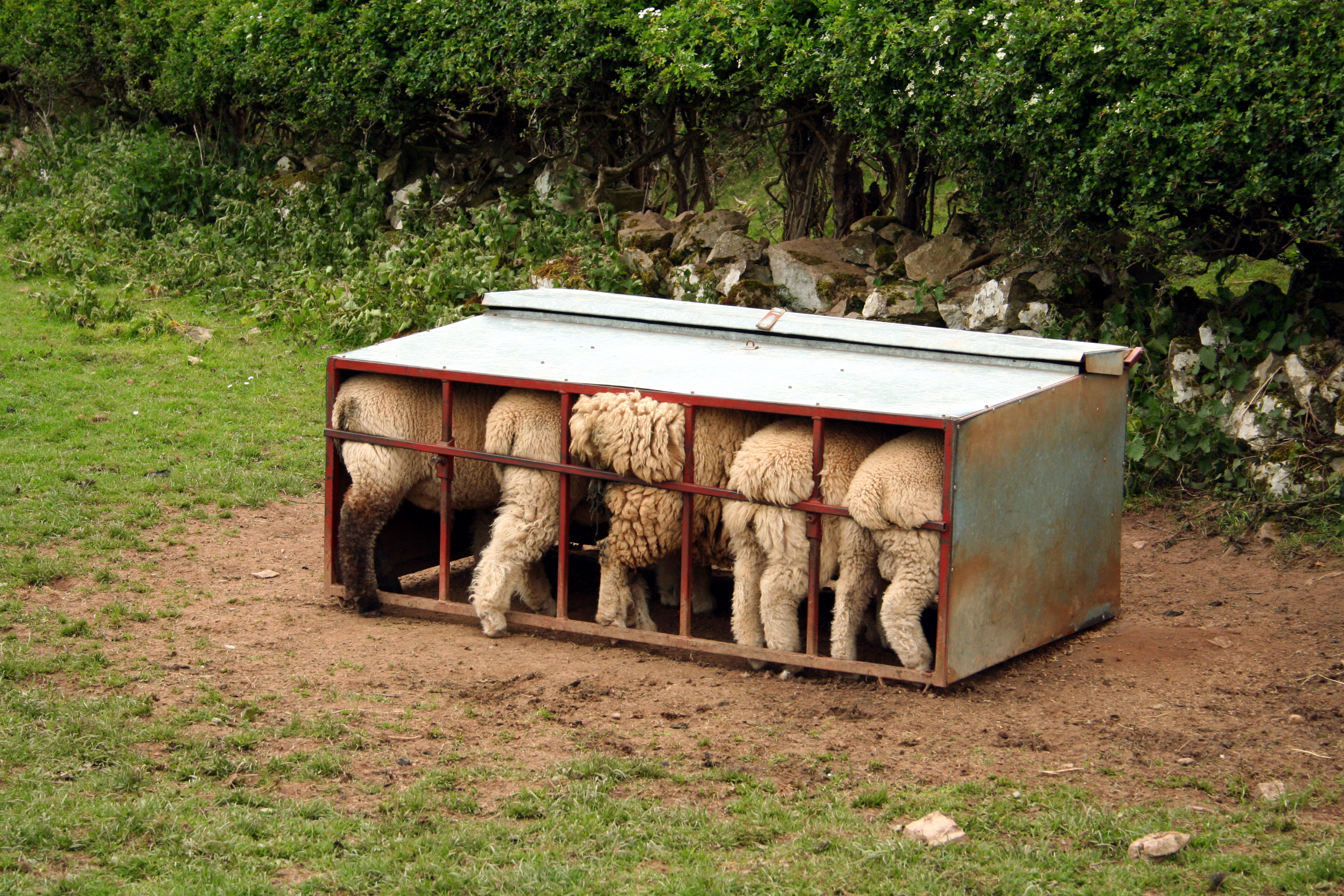
Welsh lambs utilizing a "creep feeder": a place where small lambs can eat but adult sheep cannot

A feeder is a container which delivers feed or fodder to livestock such as cattle, sheep, and horses. Types of feeders include fixed holders and trailer-mounted hoppers.

== See also ==
- Manger
