= Mellieħa =

Mellieħa Il-Mellieħa
- Local council
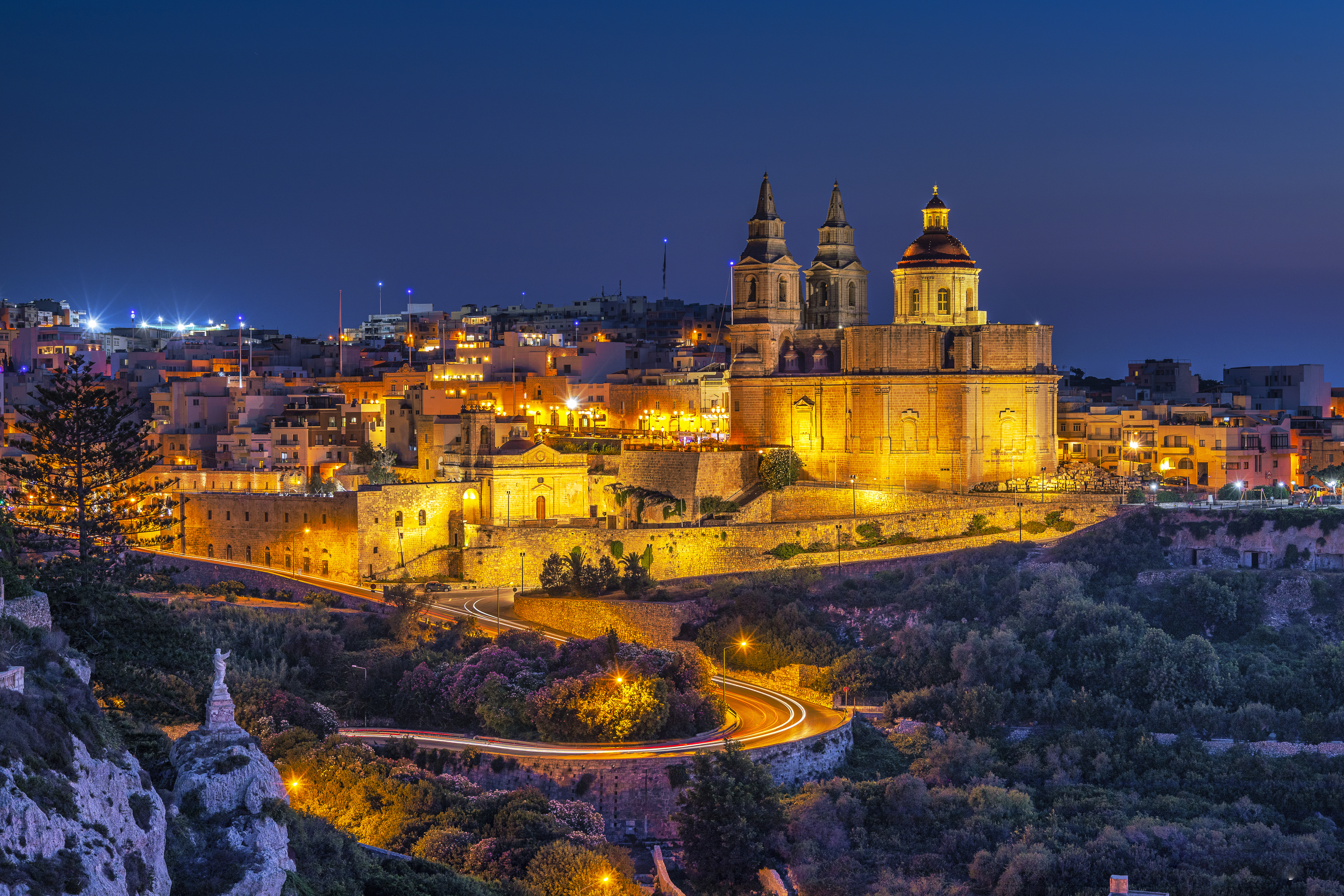
- Mellieħa village core at night, prominently featuring the parish church

- Flag Coat of arms

- Coordinates: 35°57′23″N 14°21′59″E
- Country: Malta
- Region: Northern Region
- District: Northern District
- Borders: Mġarr, St. Paul's Bay

Government
  - Mayor: Gabriel Micallef (PN)

Area
  - Total: 22.6 km^{2} (8.7 sq mi)
- Elevation: 150 m (490 ft)

Population (Jul. 2024)
  - Total: 14,232
  - Density: 630/km^{2} (1,630/sq mi)
- Demonym(s): Mellieħi (m), Melliħija (f), Melliħin (pl)
- Time zone: UTC+1 (CET)
  - Summer (DST): UTC+2 (CEST)
- Postal code: MLH
- Dialing code: 356
- ISO 3166 code: MT-30
- Patron saint: Mary's Birth (Bambina)
- Day of festa: 8 September
- Website: Official website

Mellieħa (Maltese: il-Mellieħa [ɪl mɛˈlːɪːħɐ]) is a large village in the Northern Region of Malta. The population of Mellieħa was 14,232 in July 2024. This included 7,578 males and 6,654 females; 9,312 Maltese nationals and 4,920 foreign nationals. Mellieħa is also a tourist resort, popular for its sandy beaches, natural environment, and Popeye Village nearby.

== Etymology ==
The name Mellieħa is derived from the Semitic root m-l-ħ, which means salt. This is probably due to the ancient Punic-Roman salt pans which existed at Mellieħa Bay. The site of the salt pans is now occupied by the Għadira Nature Reserve.

== Local council ==
The Mellieħa Local Council was created in 1993 with the introduction of local government in Malta under the Local Councils Act (Act XV of 1993). The council’s administrative area covers Mellieħa and the nearby village of Manikata and forms part of Malta’s Northern Region. The council offices are located at 126, Triq il-Mitħna l-Ġdida, Mellieħa, MLĦ 1107.

Mellieħa maintains town-twinning relations with the Comune di Cavriglia (Tuscany, Italy), a partnership whose agreement dates back to the late 2000s and has been periodically renewed through cultural and youth exchanges.

Following the 2024 local elections, an arrangement between councillors led to Gabriel Micallef (PN) serving as mayor and Matthew Borg Cuschieri (independent) as deputy mayor for the 2024–2029 term.

== History ==
=== Prehistory to Middle Ages ===
Mellieħa was first inhabited in around 3000 BC, during the Neolithic period. Several megalithic remains have been found, including the temple of Għajn Żejtuna, as well as several caves and tombs, in which tools and pottery fragments were found.

During the Roman period, troglodytes began to live in the caves of Mellieħa's valleys. The cave settlements continued to exist during Byzantine rule, but were abandoned in the early medieval period.

According to the Acts of the Apostles, St. Paul was shipwrecked in Malta in around 60 AD, possibly in the nearby St. Paul's Bay. According to local tradition, St. Luke, who was accompanying St. Paul, came across one of Mellieħa's caves and painted the figure of Our Lady on the rock face. In 409 AD, the cave was consecrated as a church, and it is now known as the Sanctuary of Our Lady of Mellieħa.

Mellieħa was one of the first ten parishes of Malta. It still existed in 1436, but was abandoned soon afterwards in the late 15th or early 16th century, since the north of Malta was no longer safe due to raids by Muslim corsairs.

=== Under the Order of Saint John ===
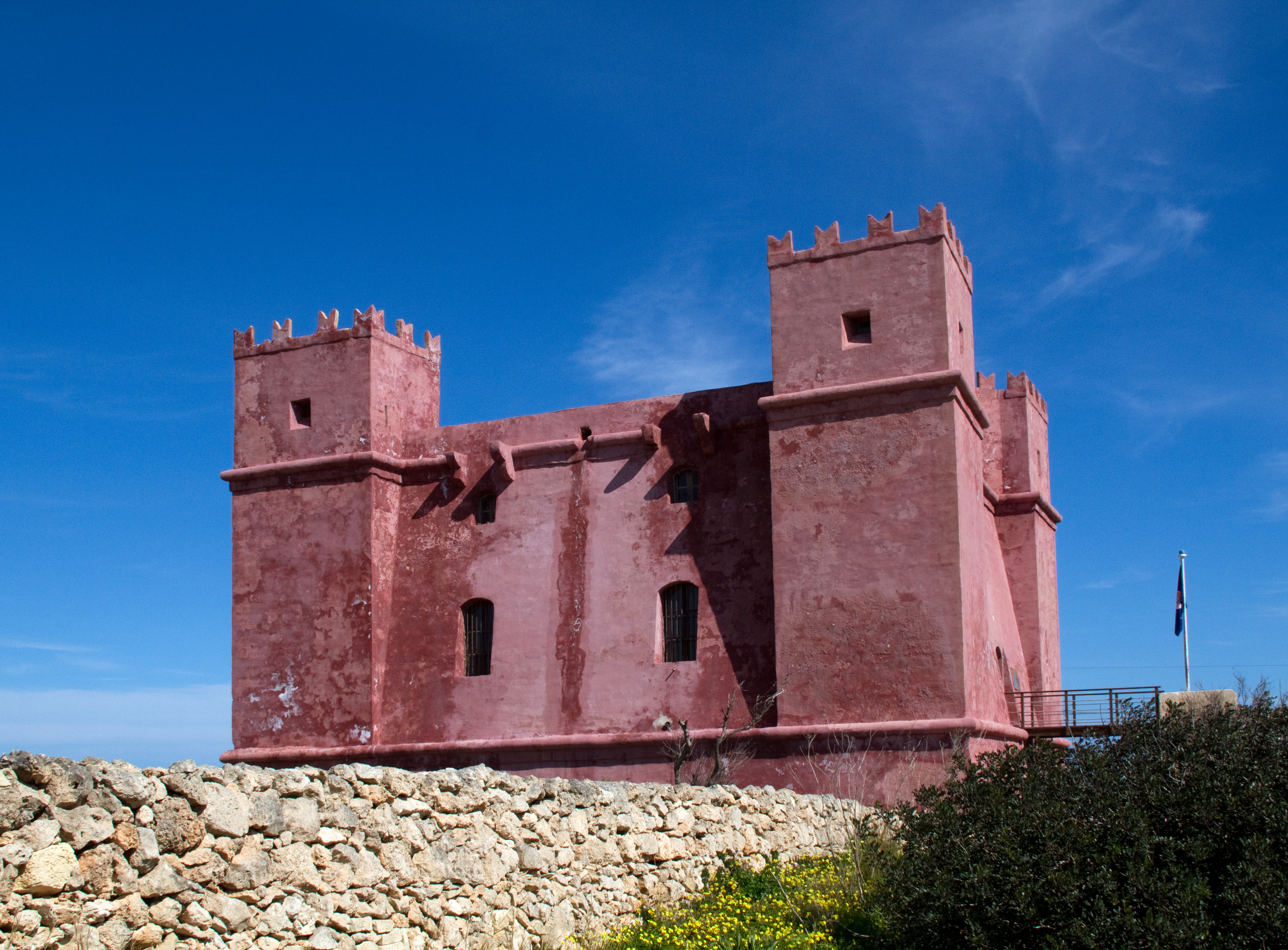
Saint Agatha's Tower

Malta was one of the first regions that Muslims entered in the Mediterranean, and this is evident in the Islamic heritage of buildings and ancient relics of mosques and homes. In addition to that the Arabic language that has remained rooted in the language of the current people of the island, this was starting from year 826 A.D. and lasted for 220 years.

During the early years of Hospitaller rule in Malta, Mellieħa remained abandoned. In the late 16th century, the Sanctuary of Our Lady of Mellieħa was rebuilt.

The northern coast of Malta began to be fortified in the early 17th century. The first fortification to be built in Mellieħa was Saint Agatha's Tower, which was completed in 1649. This large tower was built on Marfa Ridge, overlooking Mellieħa Bay, with clear views of Comino and Gozo. The smaller Għajn Ħadid Tower and Armier Tower were also built in the limits of Mellieħa in 1658.

A series of coastal batteries, redoubts and entrenchments were also built in Mellieħa in the 18th century. Several of these still survive, such as Mistra Battery, Vendôme Battery, Wied Musa Battery and Westreme Battery. The Devil's Farmhouse found at Ta' Randa area is an example of Maltese farmhouses built in the 18th century.

=== British period to present day ===
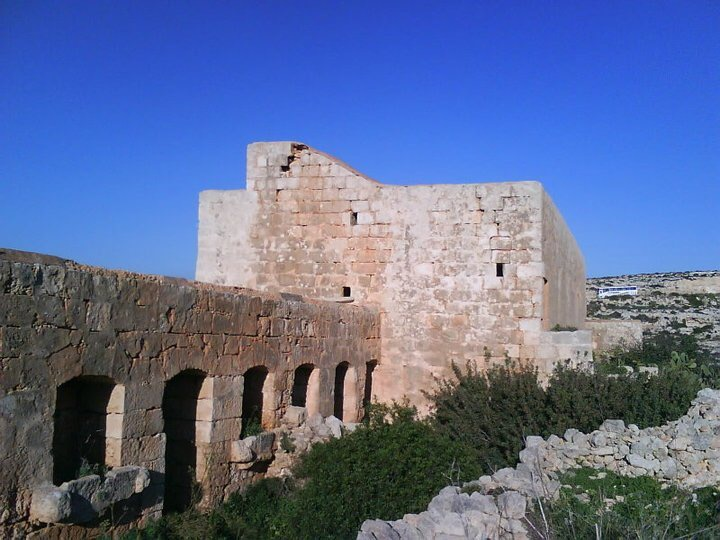
The Devil's Farmhouse (Ir-Razzett tax-Xitan)

Mellieħa, as it is today, developed whilst Malta was under British rule. The village became a parish once again in 1844, and began to develop after the British encouraged people to settle in the area by giving leases to the population. The Parish Church of the Nativity of the Virgin Mary was built in various stages in the late 19th and early 20th centuries and, it is said that the locals helped in building the church. A postal agency opened in Mellieħa in 1891.

Just before World War II, Fort Campbell was built in Selmun, whilst Mellieħa Fort was built on top of Mellieħa Hill as a lookout post. The British also built a number of pillboxes around the coastline of Mellieħa, for defensive purposes in case of an Italian or German invasion. The Qammieh Radio Installation was built in 1938.

Mellieħa has seen a lot of development since the end of the war. The Mellieħa Local Council was established by the Local Councils Act of 1993.

== Geography ==
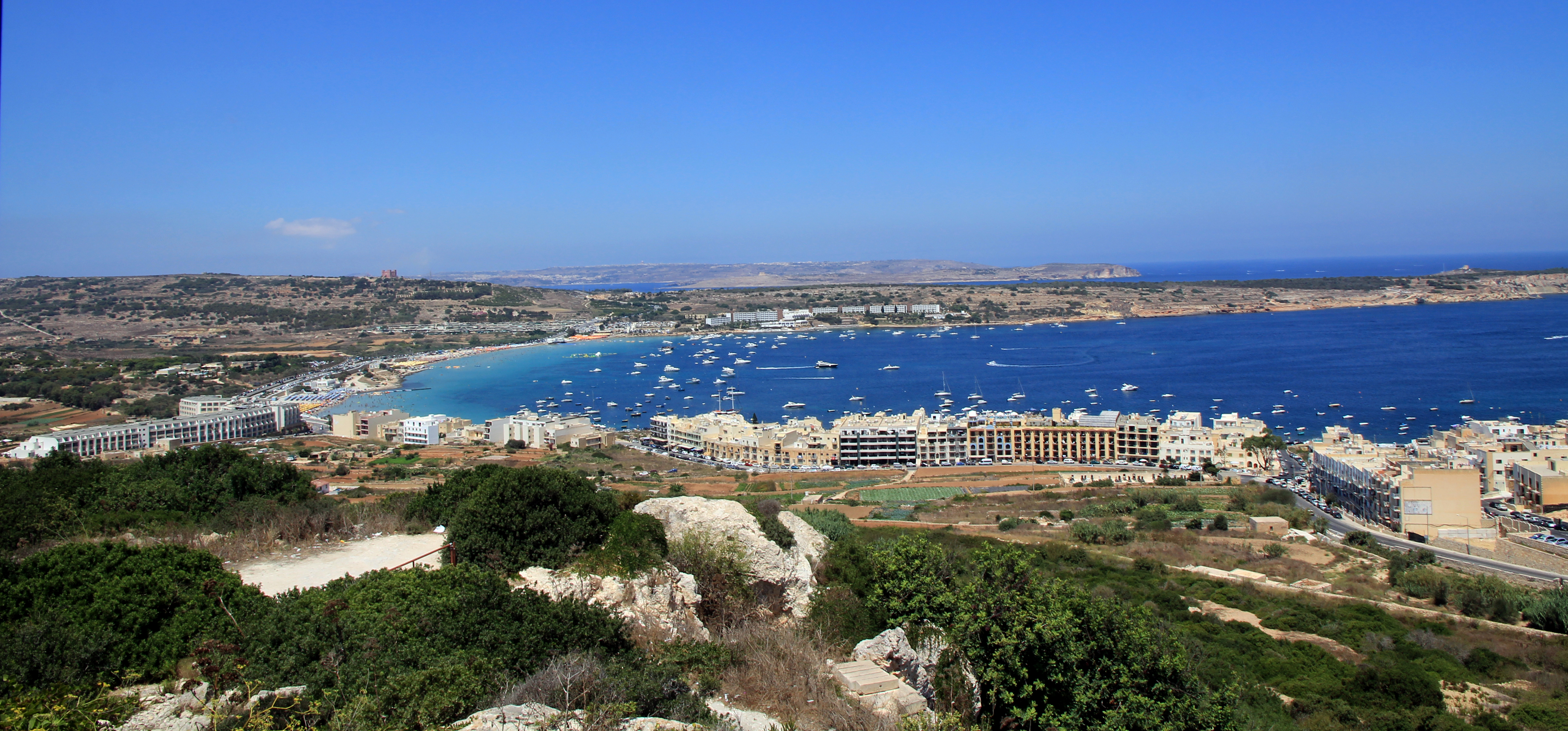
Mellieħa Bay

The town of Mellieħa stands on a group of hills on the northwest coast of the main island. Mellieħa proper consists of the areas of Mellieħa Heights, Santa Maria Estate, il-Qortin, Ta' Pennellu, Ta' Masrija and Tal-Ibraġ. The nearby villages of Manikata and Selmun also fall under Mellieħa's jurisdiction.

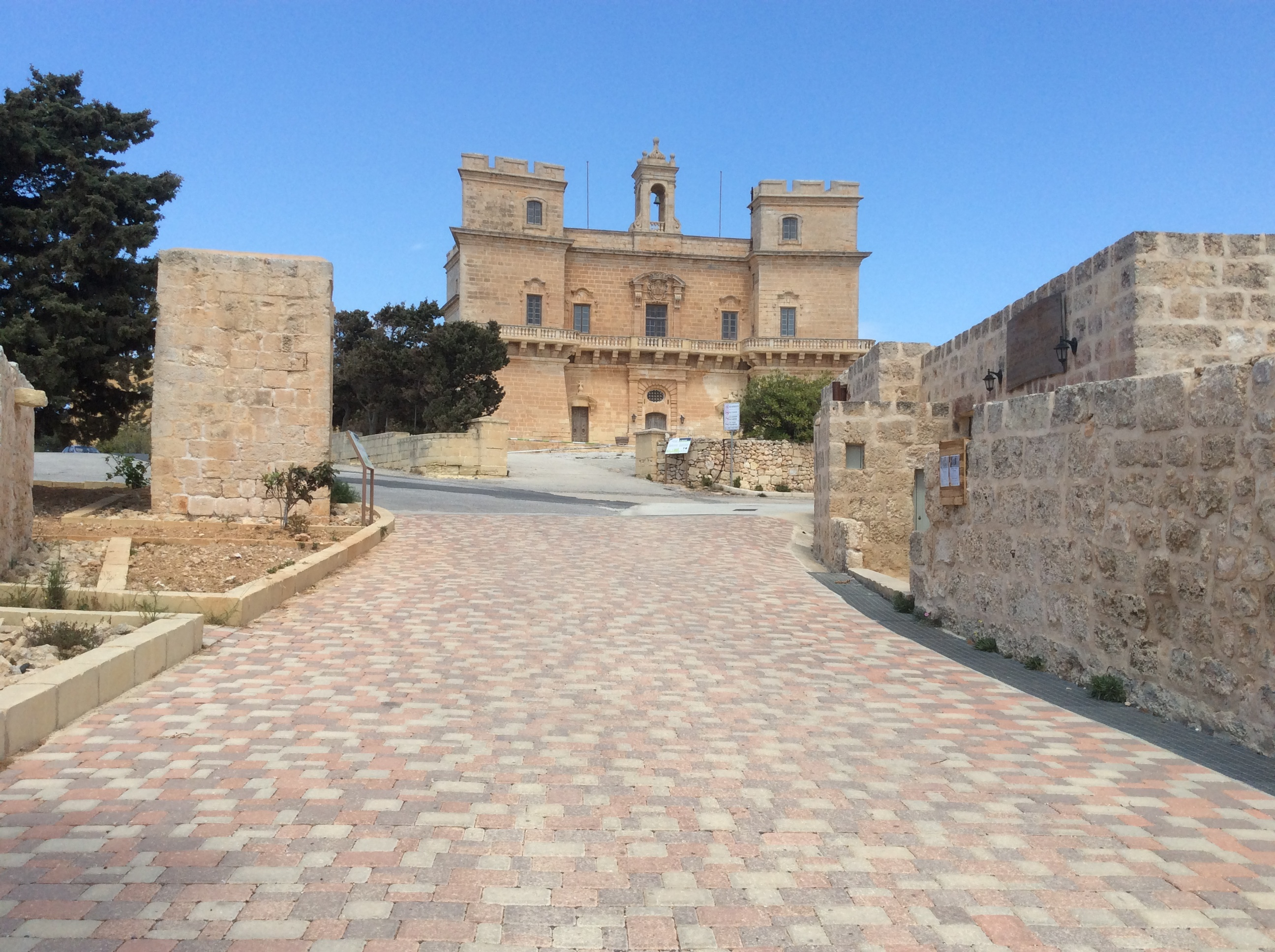
Selmun Palace and farms complex

The town overlooks Mellieħa Bay, which includes Għadira Bay, the largest sandy beach in Malta. To the east of the town and bay, there is the Selmun peninsula, and St Paul's Islands lie about 80 metres off the coast. Mistra Bay lies close to Selmun, and this marks the boundary between Mellieħa and St. Paul's Bay.

The large Marfa Peninsula lies to the north of Mellieħa. It includes several small bays, such as Armier Bay and Paradise Bay, as well as the harbour of Ċirkewwa, from which the Gozo ferry departs. The Marfa Ridge spans across a large part of the peninsula.

To the south of Marfa Ridge, there are Anchor Bay and Popeye Village, Majjistral Nature and History Park, the hamlet of Manikata and Golden Bay. The boundary with Mġarr lies at Għajn Tuffieħa.

== Tourism ==
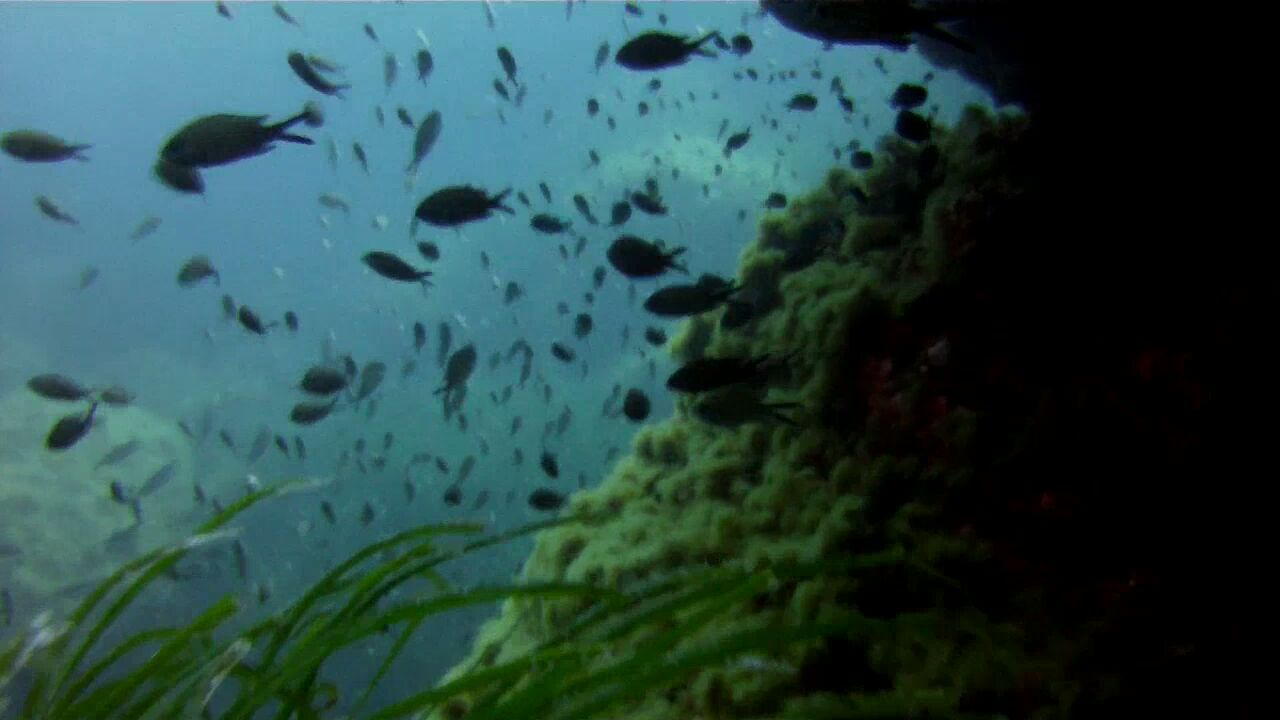
Ċirkewwa is a popular dive site

Mellieħa is a popular tourist destination during the summer months. It is well known for its beaches, with the most well known being Għadira Bay and Golden Bay. Ċirkewwa is also popular as a dive site, and includes the wrecks of MV Rozi and the P29 patrol boat.

In 2009, Mellieħa was awarded the title of European Destination of Excellence due to its sustainable initiatives.

Sailing is also a major drive for tourism with the Euromed championships taking place between the 19th and the 22nd of December from the beach by the "Munchies" restaurant. It has both ILCA and Optimist dinghys racing and has been held every year since 2000.

- Dawret il-Mellieħa (Mellieħa By-Pass)
- Triq Ġorġ Borg Olivier (Ġorġ Borg Olivier Street)
- Triq il-Kbira (Main Street)
- Triq il-Marfa (Marfa Road)
- Triq il-Prajjiet (Anchor Bay Road)
- Triq Louis Wettinger (Louis Wettinger Street)
- Triq San Pawl il-Baħar (St. Paul's Bay Road)

== Twin towns – sister cities ==
Mellieħa is twinned with:

- Adenau, Germany (since 1996)
- Ayia Napa, Cyprus (since 2009)
- Cavriglia, Italy (since 2007)
