= List of monuments in Mqabba =

This is a list of monuments in Mqabba, Malta, which are listed on the National Inventory of the Cultural Property of the Maltese Islands.

== List ==
Name of object	Location	Coordinates	ID	Photo	Upload
The Old Hospital	Daħlet L-Isptar il-Qadim	35°50′39″N 14°28′03″E	01202	The Old Hospital	Upload Photo
Vincenti Tower	Triq it-Torri Vinċenti	35°50′52″N 14°28′05″E	01442	Vincenti Tower	Upload Photo
Statue of Saint Francis of Assisi	Triq tas-Sejba c/w Triq Santa Katerina	35°50′32″N 14°27′54″E	01836	Statue of Saint Francis of Assisi	Upload Photo
Statue of the Immaculate Conception	Triq tas-Sejba c/w Triq il-Qrendi	35°50′31″N 14°27′54″E	01837	Statue of the Immaculate Conception	Upload Photo
Niche of St Paul	Triq Ħal-Kirkop c/w Triq il-Konvoj ta' Santa Marija	35°50′31″N 14°27′56″E	01838	Niche of St Paul	Upload Photo
Niche of St Michael	Triq il-Parroċċa c/w Sqaq Buħar	35°50′47″N 14°27′43″E	01839	Niche of St Michael	Upload Photo
Niche of Christ the King	101-103 Triq il-Parroċċa	35°50′46″N 14°27′50″E	01840	Niche of Christ the King	Upload Photo
Chapel of Our Lady of Sorrows	Triq id-Duluri	35°50′44″N 14°27′57″E	01841	Chapel of Our Lady of Sorrows	Upload Photo
Niche of St Michael	11 Triq id-Duluri	35°50′44″N 14°27′58″E	01842	Niche of St Michael	Upload Photo
Parish Church of the Assumption of the Madonna	Misraħ il-Knisja	35°50′44″N 14°28′02″E	01843	Parish Church of the Assumption of the Madonna	Upload Photo
Statue of Saint Roque	Misraħ il-Knisja	35°50′44″N 14°28′01″E	01844	Statue of Saint Roque	Upload Photo
Statue of the Immaculate Conception	Misraħ il-Knisja	35°50′44″N 14°28′00″E	01845	Statue of the Immaculate Conception	Upload Photo
Statue of Christ Redeemer	Misraħ il-Knisja	35°50′44″N 14°28′01″E	01846	Statue of Christ Redeemer	Upload Photo
Statue of Saint John the Baptist	Misraħ il-Knisja	35°50′44″N 14°28′01″E	01847	Statue of Saint John the Baptist	Upload Photo
Cross	Misraħ il-Knisja	35°50′44″N 14°28′01″E	01848	Cross	Upload Photo
Statue of the Assumption	"Palazz Santa Marija", 92 Triq San Bażilju	35°50′45″N 14°28′01″E	01849	Statue of the Assumption	Upload Photo
Statue of the Assumption	Misraħ il-Knisja	35°50′43″N 14°28′01″E	01850	Statue of the Assumption	Upload Photo
Chapel of St. Catherine	1 Triq Santa Katerina	35°50′42″N 14°28′02″E	01851	Chapel of St. Catherine	Upload Photo
Niche of the Madonna of Sacro Cuor	20 Triq Santa Katerina	35°50′41″N 14°28′00″E	01852	Niche of the Madonna of Sacro Cuor	Upload Photo
Niche of Saint Innocent Martyr	83 Triq San Bażilju	35°50′43″N 14°28′03″E	01853	Niche of Saint Innocent Martyr	Upload Photo
Niche of St Joseph	91/92 Triq San Bażilju	35°50′44″N 14°28′03″E	01854	Niche of St Joseph	Upload Photo
Chapel of Saint Basil	Triq San Bażilj	35°50′43″N 14°28′05″E	01855	Chapel of Saint Basil	Upload Photo
Chapel of Saint Michael	Triq San Bażilju	35°50′43″N 14°28′04″E	01856	Chapel of Saint Michael	Upload Photo
Niche of the Madonna of Purgatory	Triq San Bażilju	35°50′43″N 14°28′04″E	01857	Niche of the Madonna of Purgatory	Upload Photo
Niche of St Joseph	20 Triq il-Karmnu	35°50′45″N 14°28′00″E	01858	Niche of St Joseph	Upload Photo
Niche of the Assumption	Triq il-Parroċċa	35°50′45″N 14°27′58″E	01859	Niche of the Assumption	Upload Photo
Niche of the Assumption	Triq il-Parroċċa	35°50′45″N 14°27′58″E	01860	Niche of the Assumption	Upload Photo
Niche of the Madonna of Mount Carmel	Triq il-Karmnu c/w Triq Valletta	35°50′46″N 14°28′00″E	01861	Niche of the Madonna of Mount Carmel	Upload Photo
Niche of St Michael	Triq San Bażilju c/w Triq il-Lanġasa	35°50′48″N 14°28′09″E	01862	Niche of St Michael	Upload Photo
Niche of St Joseph	Triq Valletta	35°50′49″N 14°28′12″E	01863	Niche of St Joseph	Upload Photo
Niche of St Paul	"Ta Torri Spero", Triq it-Torri Vinċenti	35°50′53″N 14°28′04″E	01864	Niche of St Paul	Upload Photo
Niche of the Assumption	Sqaq il-Knisja	35°50′46″N 14°28′01″E	01865	Niche of the Assumption	Upload Photo
Ta’ Marżepp	73 Triq il-Paroċċa	35°50′46″N 14°27′53″E	02590		Upload Photo
L-Għanja	75–77 Triq il-Paroċċa	35°50′46″N 14°27′53″E	02591		Upload Photo
Barumbara u ġnien tal-madwar	Triq Santa Marija k/m Triq iċ-Ċavi	35°50′37″N 14°28′00″E	02599	more files	Upload Photo
