= List of localities in Malta =

This is a list of localities (i.e.: populated places: zones, areas, sides, etc.) located in Malta and Gozo, sorted by each local council.

== Malta ==
=== Ħ'Attard (ATD) ===
- Attard Industrial Estate - code: ATD 3000
- Ħal Warda (Rose Village) - code: from ATD 1404 - ATD 1409
- Misraħ Kola (Nicholas Square)
- Robbu tal-Ħemsija - code: ATD 4890
- Sant'Anton (Saint Anthony) - code: ATD 1290
- Santa Katerina (Saint Catherine) - code: from ATD 2600 - ATD 2609
- Ta' Fġieni
- Ta' Ħemsija - code: ATD 4890
- Tal-Idward
- Ta' Qali - code: ATD 4854
- Ta' Qali Crafts Village - code: ATD 4000
- Ta' Torba
- Ta' Vnezja
- Tal-Fuklar (Fireplace Estate) - code: from ATD 2481 - ATD 2486
- Tal-Karri (Curry Area) - code: ATD 4000
- Tal-Madliena (Magdalene Area)
- Tal-Madonna (Our Lady Zone)
- Tal-Maltija (Maltese Lady Zone)
- Tal-Mirakli (Miracles Estate)
- Wied Inċita (Incita Valley) - code: ATD 3090
- Wied ta' Rmiedi (Rmiedi Valley)

=== Ħal Balzan (BZN) ===
- Buontempo Estate - code: from BZN 1170 - BZN 1177
- Ta' Vestru (Evarist Zone)
- Wied Ħal Balzan (Balzan Valley)- code: from BZN 1401 - BZN 1409

=== Il-Bidnija (MST) ===
- Tal-Bidnija
- Tas-Sagra Familja (Holy Family Zone) - code: from MST 5100 to MST 5102
- Ħal Dragu (Dragoon Village)
- Ta' Gebel Ghawzara
- Ta' Braret
- Il-Qolla (The Low Hill)
- Il-Ħolja
- Il-Ħżejjen (The Badest)
- Tal-Milord - code: from MST 5050 to MST 5054
- Wied Qanotta
- Wied Tal-Ħżejjen (Badest Valley)

=== Il-Birgu (Vittoriosa) (BRG) ===
- Fuq il-Fortini - code: BRG 2020
- Fuq Tal-Ħawli
- Il-Foss tas-Sur - code: BRG 1220
- It-Toqba tal-Birgu - code: BRG 1740
- Sagra Infirmerija - code: BRG 1410 and BRG 1411
- Tal-Lhud (Jewish Zone) - code: BRG 1330
- Xatt il-Forn - code: BRG 1711
- Xatt ir-Risq (Joy Strand) - code: from BRG 1730 - BRG 1738
- Xatt tal-Birgu (Vittoriosa Waterfront)- code: BRG 1721

=== Birkirkara (BKR) ===
- Bwieraq (Berries)- code: from BKR 1210 to BKR 1219
- Fleur-de-Lys
- Għar il-Ġobon (Cheese Cave) - code: from BKR 2700 to BKR 2709
- Ħas-Sajjied (Fisherman Village)- code: from BKR 2400 to BKR 2405
- Laqxija - code: from BKR 2644 to BKR 2655
- Mrieħel Industrial Estate
- Ta' Ganu - code: from BKR 1100 to BKR 1109
- Ta' Paris (Paris Area)- code: from BKR 4440 to BKR 4481
- Ta' Sqaq il-Għoġla (Small Cow Alley Zone)
- Tal-Ħerba (Disaster Zone) - code: from BKR 2320 to BKR 2326
- Tal-Maħlut
- Tal-Qattus (Cat Zone)

=== Birżebbuġa (BBĠ) ===
- Bengħajsa - code: from BBĠ 3043 to BBĠ 3045
- Borġ in-Nadur- code: from BBĠ
- Brolli
- Girgħien (Huts)
- Għar Dalam (Dalam Cave)
- Għar Ħasan (Hasan Cave)
- Ħal Far (Rat Village)
- Kalafrana (Calafrana)
- L-Imwadar
- Nadur (Birżebbuġa)
- Nigret (Birżebbuġa)
- Pretty Bay
- Qajjenza
- St George's Bay (Birżebbuġa)
- Ta' B'Xejn (Free Zone)
- Ta' Ġiliġejla
- Ta' Salvun
- Ta' Sansajna
- Ta' Żgħer
- Tal-Garda
- Tal-Germun
- Tal-Ġurġier
- Tal-Għawejra
- Tal-Pajtier
- Tal-Papa (Pope Estate)
- Tax-Xerriek
- Wied Dalam (Dalam Valley)
- Wied il-Qoton (Cotton Valley)
- Wied ix-Xoqqa (Lycra Valley)
- Wied Żnuber (Oak Valley)
- Xoqqiet

=== Bormla (Cospicua) (BML) ===
- Bieb Bormla
- Fortini Ta' Feliċ
- Fuq San Pawl
- Fuq Verdala (Above Verdala)
- Kortina San Nikola
- Kwartier San Nikola
- Polverista
- San Ġwann t'Għuxa (St. John Estate)
- Tal-Ħawli
- Xatt ta' Bormla

=== Ħad-Dingli (DGL) ===
- Dingli Cliffs
- Ġnien Ġewwieri
- Għar Bittija
- Għar Mirdum
- Dahar (Back)
- Ħal Tartarni (Tartarni)
- Ħawlija
- Il-Ħfar
- Il-Kunfettier (The Confectionery)
- Il-Qaws (The Bow)
- Misraħ Suffara (Whistle Estate)
- Qbiela (The Field Rent)
- Ta' Għamajra
- Ta' Qasam (Estate Zone)
- Tal-Imgħajlaq
- Ta' Newma
- Ta' Rbazza
- Ta' Zekzek
- Tal-Ħamri
- Tal-Ħbula (Ropes Zone)
- Tal-Kalċ (Calcidone Area)
- Tal-Lhudi (Jew Zone)
- Tal-Madliena Barra x-Xagħra
- Ta' Minċejjen
- Tal-Pitkal (Greengrocer Area)
- Tal-Wata
- Tas-Sienja
- Tax-Xatba (Gate Zone)
- Xagħra l-Kbira (The Big Open Field)
- Wied Ħażrun
- Wied il-Bużbież

=== Il-Fgura (FGR) ===
- Ta' Ġerman
- Ta' Penza (Penza Area)
- Ta' Sqaq Kubrit (Cobrite Lane Zone)
- Ta' Tira
- Tal-Foss (Granery Area)
- Tal-Gallu
- Wied Blandun

=== Il-Furjana (FRN) ===
- Argotti
- Belt il-Ħażna (Store City)
- Belt is-Sebħ (Sunrise City)
- Crown Works Ditch
- Foss Korni
- Foss ta' Notre Dame
- Hay Wharf (Xatt it-Tiben)
- Il-Mall
- Ozpizio
- Sa' Maison
- Tal-Bombi (Porte Des Bombes)
- Xatt Pinto or Valletta Waterfront

=== Ħal Għargħur (GĦR) ===
- Ġwiedi
- Il-Fanal (The Lamp)
- Ta' Żellieqa (Slippery Zone)
- Tal-Ferħa (Happiness Zone)
- Tal-Ħofra (Hole Zone)
- Tax-Xaqquf
- Tax-Xiħ (Old Man Zone)
- Wied Anġlu (Angel Valley)
- Xwieki

=== Ħal Għaxaq (GXQ) ===
- Ħal Dmikki
- Ħas-Saptan (Saptan)
- Ta' Garda
- Ta' Loretu (Loreto Zone)
- Tal-Barklor
- Tal-Barrani (Foreigner Zone)
- Tal-Ġebel (Rocks Area)
- Tal-Millieri
- Tal-Qattus (Cat Zone)
- Tal-Wilġa (Open Flat Field Zone)
- Tas-Salib (Cross Zone)

=== Il-Gudja (GDJ) ===
- Bir Miftuħ (Open Well)
- Ħal Resqun (Resqun)
- Ta' Bettina (Bettany Area)
- Ta' Loretu (Loreto Zone)
- Ta' Xlejli
- Tal-Ħamra (Red Women Zone)
- Tal-Ħofra (Ditch Area)
- Tal-Lampat
- Tal-Lebbien
- Tal-Mitħna (Mill Zone)
- Tat-Tajjara (Cotton Zone)

=== Il-Gżira (GŻR) ===
- Manoel Island
- Tal-Kubrit

=== Il-Ħamrun (ĦMR) ===
- San Gejtanu
- Tas-Samra (Our Lady of Atocia)
- Tar-Rabbat
- Tad-Duluri (Our Lady of Sorrows)
- Il-Kunċizzjoni (Immaculate Conception)
- Il-Blata l-Bajda (White Rock)
- Ta' Braxia

=== L-Iklin (IKL) ===
- Ta' Kieles
- Tal-Balal
- Tat-Tabib (Doctor Area)

=== Il-Kalkara (KKR) ===
- Bighi
- Fort Ricasoli
- Il-Wileġ (The Open Fields)
- It-Turretta (The Turrett)
- Kalkara Creek
- Ricasoli Point
- Rinella Bay
- Rnella Valley
- San Pietru (Saint Peter)
- Santa Liberata (Saint Liberatas)
- Santu Rokku (Saint Rocco)
- Smart City Malta (Ricasoli Industrial Estate)
- Ta' Tewma (Garlic's Village)
- Ta' Wied Għammieq (Ghammieq Valley's Village)
- Tar-Ramel (Sandy Village)
- Villa Portelli
- Wied Rinella (Rinella Valley)
- Il-Kapuccini

=== Ħal Kirkop (KKP) ===
- Bonu ż-Żgħir
- Qasam Tal-Menħir (Menhir Estate)
- Tal-Aħfar
- Tal-Isqof (Bishop Zone)
- Tal-Fieres
- Tal-Iblieq
- Tas-Sienja
- Taż-Żebbiegħ (Painter Zone)

=== Ħal Lija (LJA) ===
- Ħal Bordi
- Ħal Mann
- Ta' Bajdun
- Ta' Seguna
- Tad-Daħla (Entrance Area)
- Tal-Mirakli (Miracles Zone)
- Wied Lija (Lija Valley)

=== Ħal Luqa (LQA) ===
- Bir-Ġurat (Grasshopper Well)
- Cargo Village
- Għammieri
- Ingiered
- Ħal Farruġ
- Luqa Industrial Zone
- Taċ-Ċawla
- Tal-Bandieri (Flags Zone)
- Tal-Ħabaq
- Tal-Maħżnier
- Tal-Vitorja (Victory Zone)
- Ta' San Tumas (St. Thomas Area)
- Ta' Wied Knejjes (Churches Valley Zone)
- Wied Betti
- Xagħra tas-Simar

=== Il-Marsa (MRS) ===
- Albert Town
- Parocca SSMA Trinita'
- Parocca Marija Ragina
- Triq Il-Marsa
- Belt il-Ġdida (New City)
- Belt il-Ħażna (Store City)
- Il-Menħa
- Il-Menqa
- Il-Wilġa (Dock No.7)
- Marsa Industrial Estate
- Il-Marsa Tal-Ingliżi (English Marsa)
- Belvedere Gardens
- Spencer Gardens
- Ta' Ċejlu
- Ta' Ċeppuna
- Ta' Faqqani
- Tal-Qtates (Cats Zone)
- Tat-Tromba
- Xatt il-Qwabar

=== Marsaskala or Wied il-Għajn (MSK) ===
- Barumbara
- Bellavista
- Bidni (Marsaskala)
- Il-Gżira (Marsaskala) (The Island)
- Il-Ħamrija
- Il-Magħluq (The Closing)
- Kappara (Marsaskala) (Capres)
- L-Imdawar
- Mitquba
- Munxar
- Nadur (Marsaskala)
- Noqra
- Sant' Antnin (Saint Anthony)
- St. Thomas Bay
- Ta' Gidwet
- Ta' Monita
- Tal-Isqof (Bishop Zone)
- Tad-Dawl (Light Zone)
- Tal-Blajjiet
- Tal-Bujjar Estate
- Tal-Gardiel
- Tas-Sienja
- Żonqor

=== Marsaxlokk (MXK) ===
- Ballut (Marsaxlokk)
- Delimara
- Ħal Ġinwi
- Il-Fossa (The Granery)
- Il-Magħluq (Marsaxlokk) (The Closing)
- Kalanka
- Kavallerizza
- Marnisi
- St. Peter's Pool
- Tal-Qrejten
- Tal-Wiċċ (Face Zone)
- Tas-Silġ (Ice Zone)
- Tat-Trunċiera
- Tax-Xerriek
- Xifret l-Infern
- Xrobb l-Għaġin

=== L-Imdina (MDN) ===
- Connaught Garden
- Ġnien Ħira
- Howard Garden
- Ta' Taħt is-Sur

=== Il-Mellieħa (MLĦ) ===
- Anchor Bay
- Armier Bay
- Iċ-Ċirkewwa
- Daħlet ix-Xilep
- Daħlet ix-Xmajjar (Rivers Creek)
- Ġnien ta' Xatba (Gate's Garden)
- L-Għadira
- Għajn Ħadid
- Għajn Tuffieħa (Golden Bay)
- Għajn Żejtuna (Olive Fruit Spring)
- Għar Baqrat
- Ġnien Ingraw
- Ħabel Ċillaq
- Ħal Ferħ (Happy Village)
- Il-Kortin
- Il-Moxa ta' Għajn Tuffieħa
- L-Aħrax tal-Mellieħa
- Little Armier
- Marfa
- Manikata
- Mġiebaħ
- Miżieb
- Naħħalija
- Paradise Bay
- Popeye Village
- Qasam Barrani (Foreigner Estate)
- Qortin
- Ramla ta' Wied Musa (Musa Valley Sandy Beach)
- Ramla tal-Bir (Will Sandy Beach)
- Ramla tal-Qortin
- Ramla tat-Torri (Tower Sandy Beach)
- Red Tower
- Sagħtar
- Santa Maria Estate
- Selmun
- Ta' Fuq il-Widien (Above the Valleys Zone)
- Tal-Arġentier
- Tal-Għollieqa
- Tal-Imgħarrqa
- Ta' Masrija
- Ta' Pennellu
- Ta' Qargħa
- Ta' Qassisu
- Ta' Skrajda
- Ta' Taħt l-Irdum (Below the Cliff Zone)
- Tal-Braġ
- Tas-Salib (Cross Zone)
- Tas-Sellun
- Xagħra l-Ħamra
- Xatt Santa Marija

=== L-Imġarr (MĠR) ===
- Abatija (Abbey)
- Binġemma
- Ċagħaq (Pebbles)
- Ċarċara
- Dar il-Ħamra (Red Home)
- Darrenzi
- Dwejra (Mġarr) (Small House)
- Falka
- Fomm ir-Riħ
- Ġnejna Bay (Small Garden)
- Għajn Tuffieħa
- Id-Dahar (The Back)
- Il-Blata tal-Melħ
- Il-Għalqa (The Field)
- Is-Santi
- L-Imġarr ta' Ġewwa
- L-Iskirvit
- Lippija
- Misraħ Miet (Dead Estate)
- Riviera Bay
- Skorba
- Tal-Għajn (Spring Zone)
- Ta' Ħaġrat
- Tal-Imselliet
- Ta' Mrejnu
- Ta' Qarawas
- Ta' Tewma (Garlic Zone)
- Tal-Faċċol
- Tal-Ħawlija
- Tal-Ħżejjen
- Tal-Palma
- Tal-Qanfud (Hatchok Zone)
- Tar-Ragħad (Lighting Zone)
- Żebbiegħ

=== Il-Mosta (MST) ===
- Bajjad (Painter)
- Beżbiżija
- Blata l-Għolja (High Rock)
- Għallis
- Għoqod
- Ħabel Gendus (Oxen Rope)
- Ħanqa
- Ħatba l-Bajda (White Coal)
- Il-Folju
- Mosta Technopark
- San Ġużepp Tat-Tarġa (Saint Joseph of the Stairs)
- San Pawl tal-Qliegħa
- San Silvestru (Saint Silvester)
- Santa Margerita (Saint Margreth)
- Ta' Bistra
- Ta' Ħammud
- Tal-Awrora (Aurora Zone)
- Tal-Isperanza
- Ta' Luċija (Lucy Zone)
- Ta' Maċedonja (Macedonia Zone)
- Ta' Mlit
- Ta' Redusa
- Ta' Srajġu
- Ta' Vnezja
- Ta' Xkora (Sack Zone)
- Ta' Xorxa
- Ta' Zokkrija
- Taċ-Ċawla (Mosta)
- Tad-Daqqaq (Cotton Maker Zone)
- Tad-Dib
- Tal-Gwerra (War Zone)
- Tal-Għażżi
- Tal-Ħanżira (Female Pig Zone)
- Tal-Mellu
- Tal-Qares (Sour Zone)
- Tal-Qawwi
- Tal-Wata
- Tal-Wieġ
- Tas-Sriedek
- Tat-Torba
- Tarġa Gap
- Xagħriet Ta' Fraxku
- Wied Ġjananu
- Wied Għajn Riħana (Windy Spring Valley)
- Wied il-Għasel (Honey Valley)
- Wied il-Qlejja
- Wied Ta' Kieli (Michael's Valley)
- Wied tal-Isperanza

=== L-Imqabba (MQB) ===
- Binja Ħarriġiet
- Binja Sptar Qadim
- Ħal Millieri
- Tal-Ħaġra (Gem Zone)
- Tal-Landier
- Tal-Mintna
- Tas-Sejba
- Tat-Torba
- Tax-Xantin
- Tax-Xatba l-Ħamra (Reddish Gate Zone)

=== L-Imsida (MSD) ===
- Misraħ il-Barrieri (Quarries Estate)
- Msida Circus
- Msida Strand
- Swatar
- Ta' Sisla
- Ta' Ziza
- Tal-Għeriebel
- Tal-Ħofra
- Tal-Ħriereb
- Tal-Qroqq (Owl Zone)
- Tat-Tigan

=== L-Imtarfa (MTF) ===
- Belt il-Ġmiel
- Binja Ġebel id-Dwejra
- Buqana
- Ħaż-Żmien (Era Village)
- Marġ
- Mtarfa Blokks
- Sandar
- Santa Luċija (Mtarfa) (Saint Lucy)
- Tabja
- Ta' Sagħat
- Ta' Slampa
- Tal-Għeriexem
- Tal-Maħruq
- Tal-Palma (Palm Zone)
- Tar-Rangu
- Tat-Tokk Heights

=== In-Naxxar (NXR) ===
- Baħar iċ-Ċagħaq
- Binġjala
- Birguma
- Għalis
- Ġjovadu
- Għaqba
- Ħad-Dgħejf
- Ħal Mulsulmett
- Is-Sgħajtar
- Magħtab
- Mejjieli
- Naxxar Gap
- Nigret (Naxxar)
- Ta' Alla u Ommu (God and His Mother Zone)
- Ta' Mezzi
- Tal-Wej
- Qasam San Ġorġ (Saint George Estate)
- Qalet Marku
- Qrejten
- Salina
- San Ġwann Evanġelista (Saint John the Evangelist)
- San Mikiel (Saint Michael)
- San Pawl tat-Tarġa (Saint Paul of the Step)
- Santa Katarina (Saint Catherine)
- Santa Marija tax-Xagħra
- Ta' Latmija
- Tal-Ħotba l-Bajda
- Xwiegħi
- Wied Bordi (Bordi Valley)
- Wied Filep (Philep Valley)
- Wied il-Faħam (Coal Valley)

=== Raħal Ġdid (Paola) (PLA) ===
- Addolorata
- Corradino Industrial Estate
- Għajn Dwieli
- Kordin
- Ordinanza
- Qortin
- Ras Ħanżir (Pig Point)
- Ta' Lourdes (Lourdes Zone)
- Tax-Xewk
- Xatt il-Laboratorji

=== Pembroke (PBK) ===
- Medisle Village
- St Andrew's
- St Patrick's, Malta
- White Rocks

=== Tal-Pietà (PTA) ===
- Gwardamanġa
- Ta' Braxia

=== Ħal Qormi (QRM) ===
- Fuq Tal-Blat (Above the Rock)
- Il-Wilġa (The Open Field)
- L-Armier
- L-Erba' Qaddisin
- L-Istabar
- Qormi San Bastjan (Saint Sebestian Zone Qormi)
- Qormi San Ġorġ (Saint George Zone Qormi)
- Ta' Farzina
- Ta' Paskarella (Pascarella Zone)
- Ta' San Ġwakkin
- Tad-Dwieli
- Tal-Andar
- Tal-Bajjada
- Tal-Ħandaq
- Tal-Ħlas
- Wied il-Kbir (Grand Valley)
- Wied is-Sewda (Negro Valley)

=== Il-Qrendi (QRD) ===
- Blue Grotto
- Fulija
- Gwejdija
- Għar ix-Xagħra
- Ħaġar Qim
- Ħal Lew
- Ħal Manin
- Ħatba
- Il-Ħofra (Qrendi)
- Il-Maqluba
- L-Ilsna (The Tongues)
- Msella tas-Suldati
- Qasam Tal-Warda(Rose Zone Estate)
- Ras il-Bajjada (Painters Point)
- San Niklaw (Saint Nicholas)
- Ta' Ġuarena
- Ta' Gana
- Ta' Ħassajtek
- Tal-Gawwija
- Tal-Ħniena (Mercy Zone)
- Tas-Siġra (Tree Zone)
- Tas-Suldati (Soldiers Zone)
- Wied Ħoxt
- Wied iż-Żurrieq (Zurrieq Valley)
- Żellieqa (Slippery)

=== Ir-Rabat, Malta (RBT) ===
- Baħrija (Moth)
- Bieb ir-Ruwa
- Binġemma
- Buqana
- Buskett (Forest)
- Dwejra (Rabat)
- Fiddien
- Fomm ir-Riħ (Wind's Mouth)
- Ġnien Fieres
- Ġnien il-Kbir (Grand Garden)
- Għajn Klieb (Dogs' Spring)
- Għajn Kajjet
- Għajn Kajjet Housing Estate
- Għajn Tajba
- Għar Barka
- Għar-Żerriegħa
- Għemieri
- Gwiedi (Baħrija)
- Ħal Bajjada (Painters Village)
- Ħofra ta' Ritz
- Iċ-Ċanta
- Iċ-Ċens l-Iswed
- Il-Kanuni (The Canons)
- Il-Katakombi
- Il-Kunċizzjoni (The Immaculate Conception)
- Il-Mejda (The Table)
- Il-Ponta
- Is-Salvatur (The Saviour)
- L-Isfel mill-Palazz
- L-andrijiet
- Migra Ferħa
- Mtaħleb
- Nadur (Rabat)
- Nigret (Rabat)
- Nigret tal-Ħarruba
- Qattara
- Raba' Nemel
- Sant' Agata (Saint Agatha)
- Santa Katerina (Rabat) (Saint Catherine)
- Saqqajja
- Swatar (Rabat)
- Tabja
- Ta' Busugrilla
- Ta' Fantin
- Ta' Frajna
- Ta' Franton
- Ta' Gerżuma
- Ta' Lawrenti
- Ta' Manduca
- Ta' Namura
- Ta' Qasgħa
- Ta' Rbazza
- Ta' Rużarju
- Ta' Sirena
- Ta' Żeppita
- Taċ-Ċagħki
- Tal-Forok
- Tal-Ħamri
- Tal-Laqnija
- Tal-Lunzjata (Annuciation Zone)
- Tal-Marġa
- Tal-Markiż
- Tal-Milord
- Tal-Virtù
- Tas-Salib
- Tas-Santi (Saints Zone)
- Tat-Tilliera
- Tat-Torri (Tower Zone)
- Tax-Xieref
- Wied Rini (Rini Valley)
- Wied Gerżuma
- Wied iż-Żebbuġ (Olives Valley)
- Wied Liemu
- Wied tal-Isqof (Bishop's Valley)
- Wied tal-Marġa
- Xagħra Ħurija
- Xagħra tal-Isqof

=== Ħal Safi (SFI) ===
- Il-Għadir
- Qerd in-Naħal
- Ta' Amparell
- Ta' Ħlantun
- Ta' Karwija
- Ta' Rqajja
- Ta' Sant' Agata (Saint Agatha Zone)
- Tal-Ibraġ (Ħal Safi)
- Tal-Aħwar
- Tal-Kwadru (Frame Zone)
- Tal-Palma (Palm Zone)
- Wara l-Ġnien (Behind the Garden)

=== San Ġwann (SĠN) ===
- Fuq Wied Għomor
- L-Imsieraħ
- Kappara
- Mensija
- Misraħ Lewża
- Qasbija
- San Ġwann Industrial Estate
- Ta' Ċieda
- Ta' Ġnien Fonsu
- Ta' Marmora
- Ta' Żwejt
- Tal-Balal
- Tal-Mejda
- Tar-Raddiena
- Tat-Tabib
- The Village
- Wied Għomor

=== Santa Luċija (SLĊ) ===
- Bir-Ġurat (Grasshopper Will)
- L-Isqajjaq t'Isfel (The Southern Lanes)
- Roqba
- Ta' Garnaw
- Ta' Garriba
- Wied Betti

=== Santa Venera (SVR) ===
- Misraħ il-Barrieri (Quarries Estate)
- Mrieħel Industrial Estate
- Ta' Fuq Wied (Above the Valley Zone)

=== L-Isla (Senglea) (ISL) ===
- Hneja
- Barklor

=== Is-Siġġiewi (SĠW) ===
- Fawwara
- Girgenti
- Għar il-Kbir (Grand Cave)
- Għar Lapsi (Ascension Cave)
- Għar Mundu (Raymond Cave)
- Ħal Kbir (Grand Village)
- Ħal Niklusi (Nicholas Village)
- Ħal-Xluq
- Ħesri
- Qajjied
- Ta' Brandin
- Ta' Brija
- Ta' Dun Konz
- Ta' Fuq il-Blat (Above the Rocks Zone)
- Ta' Għaqba
- Ta' Kandja
- Ta' Kirċippu
- Tal-Għolja
- Ta' Raba'
- Ta' Żagi
- Ta' Żuta
- Tal-Providenza (Providence Zone)
- Wied Ħesri
- Wied il-Girgenti (Girgenti Valley)
- Wied il-Luq
- Wied ta' Kandja
- Wied Xkora (Sack Valley)

=== Tas-Sliema (SLM) ===
- Exiles
- Font Għadir
- Għar id-Dud (Worms Cave)
- Qui-Si-Sana
- Savoy
- Tigne Point

=== San Ġiljan (STJ) ===
- Balluta
- Dragonara Point
- Fuq il-Ġonna
- Paceville
- Portomaso
- Qaliet (Creeks)
- Spinola
- St George's Bay (St Julians)
- St Julians Bay
- Ta' Giorni
- The Gardens
- Wied Ħarq Ħamiem
- Wied tal-Balluta (Balluta's Valley)

=== San Pawl il-Baħar (SPB) ===
- Bognor Beach
- Burmarrad
- Buġibba
- Ġonna tal-Barbier (Barber's Gardens)
- Il-Ħamra (The Reddish)
- Il-Magħruq
- Il-Miżieb
- Il-Qadi
- Kennedy Grove
- Mdawra (Surrounding)
- Mistra Bay
- Pwales Beach
- Qawra
- San Martin (Saint Martin's)
- San Pawl Milqi
- Simar, Malta
- Ta' Ċampra
- Ta' Erba' Mwieżeb
- Ta' Limbordin
- Tal-Basal
- Tal-Fjuri
- Tal-Għażżenin
- Tal-Qarbuni
- Tal-Veċċa
- Wardija
- Wied Qannotta
- Wied Sardin
- Xagħra Tal-Bandieri
- Xemxija

=== Is-Swieqi (SWQ) ===
- Fuq Wied Għomar
- Ġbejjen (Cheeslets)
- High Ridge
- Ibraġ
- Iċ-Ċink
- Il-Madliena (Magdalene)
- Slielem tal-Madliena (Magdalene's Leaders)
- Ta' Stronka
- Tal-Għoqod
- Tal-Franċiż (Frenchman Zone)
- Upper Gardens
- Victoria Gardens
- Wied id-Dis
- Wied Mexju

=== Ħal Tarxien (TXN) ===
- Birbixkilla
- Ħal Għarrat
- Il-Qalgħa
- L-Isqajjaq (The Lanes)
- Tal-Patri (The Brother Zone)
- Ħal-Saflieni
- Tas-Salib (Cross Zone)

=== Ta' Xbiex (XBX) ===
- Lazaretto Creek

=== Il-Belt Valletta (VLT) ===
- Fort St Elmo
- Il-Fossa
- Lascaris Wharf
- Mandraġġ
- Taħt iż-Żiemel (Below the Horse)

=== Ix-Xgħajra (XJR) ===
- Ras il-Ġebel (Rocks Point)
- San Pietru (Saint Peter)
- Ta' Alessi
- Tal-Qassisin (Priests Zone)
- Tan-Nisa (Women Zone)
- Tumbrell
- Wied Glavan

=== Ħaż-Żabbar (ŻBR) ===
- Biċċieni
- Bieb is-Sultan (King Arch)
- Buleben iż-Żgħir
- Ħas-Sajd (Fishing Village)
- Ħawlija
- Dun Lanża
- In-Naħla
- L-Imwieġel
- Santa Domenika
- Ta' Ċiantar
- Ta' Latnija
- Ta' Maġġi
- Tal-Ħamra
- Tal-Ħofra (Hole Zone)
- Tal-Plier
- Wied ta' Mazza (Mazza Valley)

=== Ħaż-Żebbuġ (Malta) (ŻBĠ) ===
- Għar Ram (Copper Cave)
- Ħabel Mustaċċi (Moustaches Rope)
- Ħal Dwien
- Ħal Mula
- Ħal Muxi
- Ħal Sajd (Fishing Village)
- Ta' Srina
- Tal-Infetti
- Ta' Wiċċ ir-Raħal (Town's Face Zone)
- Ta' Żaruna
- Tal-Imgħażel
- Tad-Dawl (Light Zone)
- Tal-Andar
- Tal-Gandlora
- Tal-Grazzja (Grace Zone)
- Tal-Għarbi (Arab Zone)
- Tar-Ramel (Sand Zone)
- Wied il-Baqqiegħa
- Wied Qirda
- Wied ta' San Martin (Saint Martin's Valley)

=== Iż-Żejtun (ŻTN) ===
- Bir id-Deheb (Gold's Well)
- Bisqallin
- Bulebel Industrial Estate
- Bulebel il-Kbir
- Bulebel iż-Żgħir
- Ġebel San Martin (Saint Martin Estate)
- Gwiedi (Small Hills)
- Ħajt il-Wied (Valley's Wall)
- Ħal Bajda (Egg's Village)
- Ħal Bisbut
- Ħal Ġwann (John's Village)
- Ħal Tmiem (Ending Village)
- Tal-Ħerba (Disaster)
- Il-Bajjada (The Painters)
- Il-Minżel
- L-Iskorra l-Kbira
- Ir-Raħal ta' Fuq (Upper Town)
- Ir-Raħal t'Isfel (Southern Town)
- Ras il-Wied (Valley Point)
- Ta' San Girgor (St. Gregory's Estate)
- San Klement (Saint Clement)
- Strenju
- Ta' Ganza
- Ta' Klement (Clement Zone)
- Ta' Pizzuta
- Ta' Salvaturi (Saviours Zone)
- Ta' Tavlin
- Ta' Tnella
- Tal-Usif
- Tal-Ħotba
- Tal-Kotob
- Wied iz-Ziju (Uncle's Valley)
- Xewkija (Żejtun)

=== Iż-Żurrieq (ŻRQ) ===
- Bubaqra
- Ġarġir
- Ħal-Millieri
- Ħlantun
- Il-Bajjada
- Il-Miżieb
- Il-Munqar
- Nigret
- Il-Qortin
- Ta' Ħal Lew
- Ta' Ħarbux
- Ta' Sant' Agatha (Saint Agatha Zone)
- Ta' Taħt iċ-Ċint (Below the Wall Zone)
- Ta' Xaqqa
- Tal-Għerien (Caves Zone)
- Taċ-Ċantar
- Tal-Bambina
- Tal-Bebbux (Snails Zone)
- Tal-Ġibjun
- Tal-Għarajjex
- Tal-Kmand (Commander Zone)
- Tirxija
- Xarolla
- Wied Babu
- Wied il-Bassasa
- Wied Fulija
- Wied Ganu
- Wied Maqbul
- Wied Moqbal

== Gozo ==
=== Il-Fontana or It-Triq tal-Għajn (FNT) ===
- Fuq il-Lunzjata (Above Annuciation)
- Is-Saqwi (Flourish Fields)
- Wied Siekel (Siekel Valley)
- Wied Tal-Lunzjata (Annuciation Valley)

=== Għajnsielem (GSM) ===
- Borġ Għarib
- Cominotto
- Comino
- Fort Chambrai
- Għar ix-Xiħ
- Gudja (Għajnsielem) (Small Hill)
- Iċ-Ċens (The Rent)
- Mġarr Port
- Miġiaro
- Mrejżbiet
- Rdum it-Tafal (Clay Cliff)
- Ta' Briegħen
- Ta' Cordina (Cordina Zone)
- Ta' Kusbejja
- Ta' Sant' Eliju (Saint Eliah Zone)
- Tal-Palma (Palm Zone)
- Xatt l-Aħmar (Reddish Strand)
- Żewwieqa

=== L-Għarb (GRB) ===
Sources:

- Birbuba
- Għammar
- Ħodba
- Il-Wileġ (Big Fields)
- San Dimitri (Saint Dimitrus)
- San Katald (Saint Catald)
- San Pietru (Saint Peter)
- Ta' Dbiegi Crafts Village
- Ta' Lamuta
- Ta' Pinu
- Ta' Santu (Saint Zone)
- Tal-Fgura (Figure Area)
- Taż-Żejt (Oil Zone)
- Wara l-Bjut (Behind The Roofs)

=== L-Għasri (GSR) ===
- Għammar
- Ta' Bubunu (Big Marble Area)
- Ta' Landar
- Tal-Kanun (Canone Zone)
- Tal-Knisja (Church Zone)
- Wied il-Għasri (Ghasri Valley)
- Wied Sara (Sahra Valley)

=== Ta' Kerċem (KĊM) ===
- Fuq il-Blat (Above the Rocks)
- Ġebel San Ġorġ
- Għadira Ta' San Raflu (Saint Raphael Lake)
- Għajn Abdul (Abdulah Spring)
- Għar Ilma (Water Cave)
- Iċ-Ċnus (The Rents)
- Klula
- Lekx
- Qasam San Ġorġ (St. George Estate)
- Qasam San Pawl (St. Paul Estate)
- Santa Luċija
- Ta' Berrini
- Ta' Ċajplu
- Ta' Ġanton
- Ta' Katas
- Ta' Summina
- Ta' Xewka
- Ta' Xkura (Sack Zone)
- Tal-Warda (Rose Zone)
- Tar-Riefnu
- Wied Ħmar (Donkey Valley)
- Xagħri

=== Il-Munxar (MXR) and Ix-Xlendi (XLN) ===
- Bajjada
- Il-Mejda (Munxar) (The Table)
- Is-Sidra (The Breast)
- It-Taksis (The Taxis)
- Kantra
- Qsajjam (Small Estate)
- Ras il-Bajda (Egg Point)
- Ras Maħrax
- Sanap
- Ta' Kamleta
- Ta' Luvier
- Ta' Merżiena
- Ta' Rinota
- Ta' Valletta (Valletta Area)
- Ta' Xaman
- Tar-Riefnu
- Wied tal-Kantra
- Xlendi
- Xlendi Valley

=== In-Nadur (NDR) ===
- Bin Ġemma
- Daħlet Qorrot
- Ġebel l-Aħmar (Reddish Rock)
- Għajn Berta
- Għajn Qasab
- Nadur Heights
- Qortin (Nadur)
- San Blas Bay
- Sejtun
- Ta' Dwardu (Edward Zone)
- Ta' Grunju
- Ta' Hida
- Ta' Kenuna
- Ta' Kuxxina
- Ta' Mattiju (Matthew Zone)
- Ta' Patrik (Patrick Zone)
- Ta' Said (Said Zone)
- Ta' Sardina
- Ta' Spilotti
- Ta' Venuta
- Ta' Wistin
- Tad-Duru
- Tal-Ħanaq
- Tal-Ħawli (Nadur)
- Tal-Laċċa
- Tal-Weraq (Leaves Area)
- Tat-Tiġrija
- Tax-Xemx (Sun Area)
- Tax-Xini
- Wied Binġemma
- Xurdin

=== Il-Qala (QLA) ===
- Andar il-Qadim
- Andar ix-Xagħri
- Dar is-Sapra
- Ġebel Barbaġanni
- Ġebel tal-Ħalfa
- Għajn Ħaġar
- Għajn Kalment
- Ħondoq ir-Rummien
- Il-Bajjad (Qala) The Painter
- Il-Ħanaq (Qala)
- Il-Qortin (Qala)
- Il-Wardija The Flowerly
- Ta' Berqa Lighting Zone
- Ta' Gafan
- Ta' Kassja
- Ta' Semper
- Tal-Ħalq
- Tal-Ħerep
- Tal-Mintuff
- Tax-Xulliel
- Wied Biljun (Billion Valley)
- Wied Simar
- Wied Tal-Blata

=== Ir-Rabat(VCT) ===
- Belliegħa
- Bieb l-Imdina
- Citadel or Iċ-Ċittadella
- Dahar il-Ħmar
- Demnija
- Forn il-Ġir
- Gelmus
- Għajn Lukin
- Il-Ġnien (The Garden)
- Ta' Mliet
- Ta' Wara s-Sur (Gozo) (Behind the Bastions)
- Tal-Ibraġ (Gozo)
- Taċ-Ċawla
- Taflija
- Tal-Far (Rat Zone)
- Tal-Grazzja (Gozo) (Grace Area)
- Tal-Maltija (Gozo) (Maltese Lady Area)
- Tal-Mejda (Table Area)
- Żenqa

=== San Lawrenz (SLZ) ===
- Dwejra (Small House)
- Funghus Rock or Ġebla tal-Ġeneral
- Fuq il-Qawra
- Fuq it-Tieqa
- Fuq tal-Bniet
- Ġebel Ben Ġorġ
- Il-Qawra (Inland Sea)
- Mendbin
- Mixta
- Ta' Bieb il-Għar (Cave Entrance Area)
- Ta' Ċangura
- Tad-Debba (Mare Zone)
- Tat-Torri (Tower Zone)
- Wied Guno (Guno Valley)
- Wied il-Kbir (Gozo) (The Grand Valley)

=== Ta' Sannat (SNT) ===
- Iċ-Ċnus (The Rents)
- Fuq tal-Gruwwa
- Il-Ħofra (Sannat) (The Hole)
- Mġarr ix-Xini
- Ta' Bardan
- Ta' Ċenċ
- Ta' Dun Nastas (Father Nastas Zone)
- Ta' Durell
- Ta' Randu
- Ta' Seguna
- Ta' Żebetta
- Tal-Gruwwa
- Tax-Xamgħan

=== Ix-Xagħra (XRA) ===
- Calypso
- Ġgantija
- Għajn Barrani
- Għajn Damma (Dice Spring)
- Għajn Lukin
- Għajn Meddew
- Għajn Sellum (Leader Spring)
- Għajn Xegħjba
- Is-Sruġ
- It-Tafla (The Clay)
- Il-Pergla
- Santa Verna (Saint Venera)
- Ir-Ramla l-Ħamra (Ramla Bay)
- Ta' Bullara
- Ta' Dun Anton (Father Anthony Zone)
- Ta' Gajdoru
- Ta' Germida
- Ta' Gorf
- Tal-Għejjun (Springs Zone)
- Ta' Nenus
- Ta' Xħajma
- Tal-Kaċċaturi (Hunters Zone)
- Tal-Kanal (Channel Zone)
- Tal-Qanfud (Hatchok Zone)
- Tan-Nazzarenu (Nazzaerth Man Zone)
- Tas-Singura
- Wied Ġnien Imrik
- Wied l-Għeżien (Tiried Man Valley)

=== Ix-Xewkija (XWK) ===
- Mġarr ix-Xini
- Ta' Bakkari
- Ta' Ġokk (Joint Zone)
- Tal-Ħamrija (Soil Area)
- Tal-Ħniena (Xewkija) (Mercy Zone)
- Tal-Barmil (Bucket Zone)
- Tal-Gruwa
- Tal-Lambert
- Tal-Loġġa
- Ta' Gorgun
- Tal-Lewż
- Tar-Rummiena
- Xewkija Industrial Estate
- Ta' Ħida
- Ta' Ħamet
- Tax-Xħajma
- Tal-Ħorob
- Tal-Kus
- Ta' Ħanzira
- It-Taflija
- Tal-Gidi
- Iċ-Ċnus
- Tal-Gonna
- Ta' Majmuna
- Ir-Rummiena
- Tal-Franċiżi
- Tas-Salvatur
- Il-Wilġa
- Ta-Cafura
- Tas-Salvatur
- Tal-Eħbiel
- Tal-Kanal
- Tal-Blankas
- Tal-Imgħajjen
- San Anard
- Tal-Lunzjata
- Ħabel is-Sierja
- Il-Bajat tal-Madonna
- Ta' Trajsu
- Tal-Knisja
- Tas-Saborra
- Il-Misraħ

=== Iż-Żebbuġ (Gozo) (ŻBB) and Marsalforn (MFN) ===
Sources:

- Għajn Melel
- Għajn Qaċċat
- Għar Qawqla
- Il-Mielħa (The Salty)
- Il-Wilġa (The Open Field)
- Marsalforn
- Menqa (Marsalforn)
- Merżuq
- Ponta Santa Marija (Saint Mary Point)
- Qbajjar Bay
- Qolla s-Safra (Yellow Hill)
- Rdum ta' Kililu
- Ta' Barda
- Ta' Ċikku
- Ta' Fra Beż
- Ta' Ġienu
- Ta' Kuljat
- Ta' Saliba
- Tal-Erbgħa (The Four Zone)
- Taċ-Ċaqra
- Ta' Abram (Abraham Zone)
- Tal-Barumbara
- Tal-Għarejjex
- Tal-Ħluq (Mouths Zone)
- Tal-Kanun (Canone Area)
- Tal-Leveċa
- Tal-Milied (Christmas Zone)
- Tas-Salvatur (Saviours Zone)
- Tas-Sellum (Leader Zone)
- Tat-Tafla (Blue-Clay Zone)
- Wied Marsalforn
- Xwejni Bay

== See also ==
- Local councils of Malta
