= St Michael's Chapel, Mqabba =

Chapel of St Michael
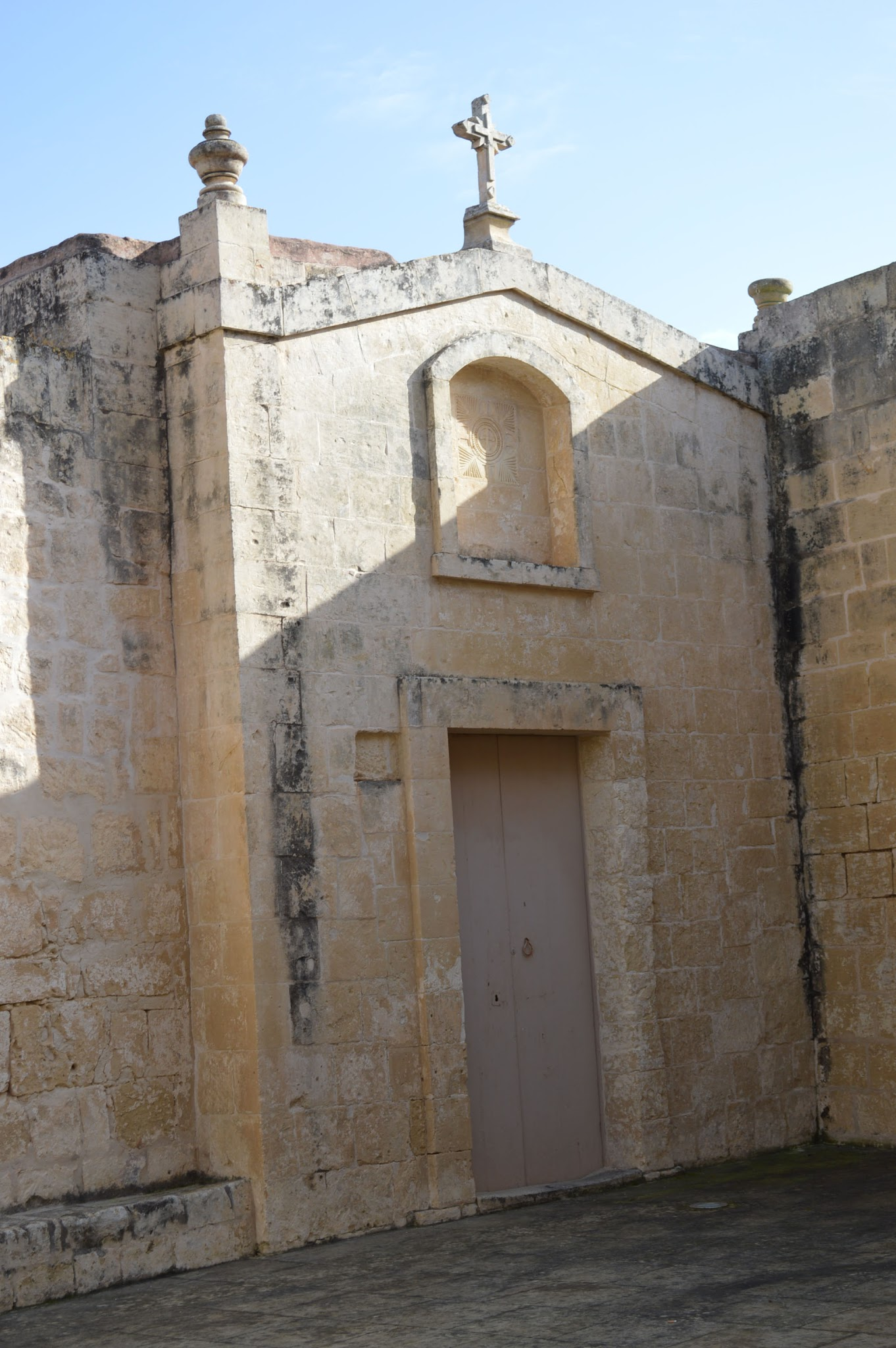
- Chapel of St Michael
- Location: Mqabba
- Country: Malta
- Denomination: Roman Catholic

History
- Status: Active
- Dedication: St Michael

Architecture
- Functional status: Church
- Completed: 1669

Administration
- Archdiocese: Malta
- Parish: Mqabba

The Chapel of St Michael is a 17th-century Roman Catholic church located in the southern village of Mqabba, Malta. The church is built adjacent to a 15th-century chapel dedicated to St Basil.

== History ==
The present church was built 1669 as commemorated in the plaque above the main door. The chapel was mentioned as being visited by the Bishop of Malta Paul Alphéran de Bussan on 26 May 1729. He ordered that the chapel contributes financially towards the construction of the quire of the parish church. In 1858 the confraternity of St Michael was established in this chapel. During the 20th century the chapel was abandoned and subsequently used as a storage facility. The chapel underwent extensive restoration in 2007.
