= List of cities in Malta =

This is a list of cities in Malta. By the usual standards that most other countries use when designating a city, Malta's cities would be too small to be considered such, and in fact Malta is sometimes regarded as a single city-state. Malta's cities are regarded as such because they received the designation of città at some point during their history. In Maltese law, no distinction is made between cities, towns, and villages; city status is purely honorary and colloquial. Malta is divided into 68 local councils. The local councils which formerly had city status all feature a mural crown on the crest of their coat of arms. The table shows the historical cities:

Within current local council	Historical city	Year granted	Image	Population (2014)	Notes
Birgu	Città Vittoriosa (Victorious City)	1530		2,629	Capital city from 1530 to 1571, and one of the Three Cities. City status confirmed following the Great Siege of Malta in 1565.
Bormla	Città Cospicua (Conspicuous City)	1722		5,395	One of the Three Cities. City status granted in 1722 by Grand Master Marc'Antonio Zondadari.
Mdina	Città Notabile (Notable City)	700 B.C		292	Capital city from antiquity to 1530.
Qormi	Città Pinto (Pinto's City)	1743		16,779	City status granted on 25 May 1743 by Grand Master Manuel Pinto da Fonseca, following a request made by Don Giuseppe Vella.
Victoria	Città Victoria (Victoria's City)	1887		6,901	Capital city of Gozo. City status granted on 10 June 1887 by Queen Victoria, following a petition made by Bishop Pietro Pace and Chief Justice Adrian Dingli on occasion of Victoria's Golden Jubilee.
Senglea	Città Invicta (Invincible City)	1565		2,784	One of the Three Cities. City status granted following the Great Siege of Malta in 1565.
Siġġiewi	Città Ferdinand (Ferdinand's City)	1797		8,367	City status granted on 30 December 1797 by Grand Master Ferdinand von Hompesch zu Bolheim, following a petition made by Don Salvatore Corso and the inhabitants.
Valletta	Città Umilissima (Humblest City)	1571		6,444	Capital city since 18 March 1571.
Żabbar	Città Hompesch (Hompesch's City)	1797		15,404	City status granted on 14 September 1797 by Grand Master Ferdinand von Hompesch zu Bolheim, following a request made by Don Carlo Caruana and the inhabitants. In 1801, the Hompesch Gate was built to commemorate this event.
Żebbuġ	Città Rohan (Rohan's City)	1777		11,903	City status granted on 21 June 1777 by Grand Master Emmanuel de Rohan-Polduc, following a petition made by the inhabitants. In 1798, the De Rohan Arch was built to commemorate this event.
Żejtun	Città Beland (Beland's City)	1797		11,508	City status granted on 30 December 1797 by Grand Master Ferdinand von Hompesch zu Bolheim, following a petition made by Don Giacomo Michele Tortella and the locals. He named it after his mother's maiden name.

== See also ==
- Local councils of Malta
- List of mayors of Malta
- List of localities in Malta
