= Mgarr ix-Xini Pumping Station =

Water pumping station on Gozo, Malta

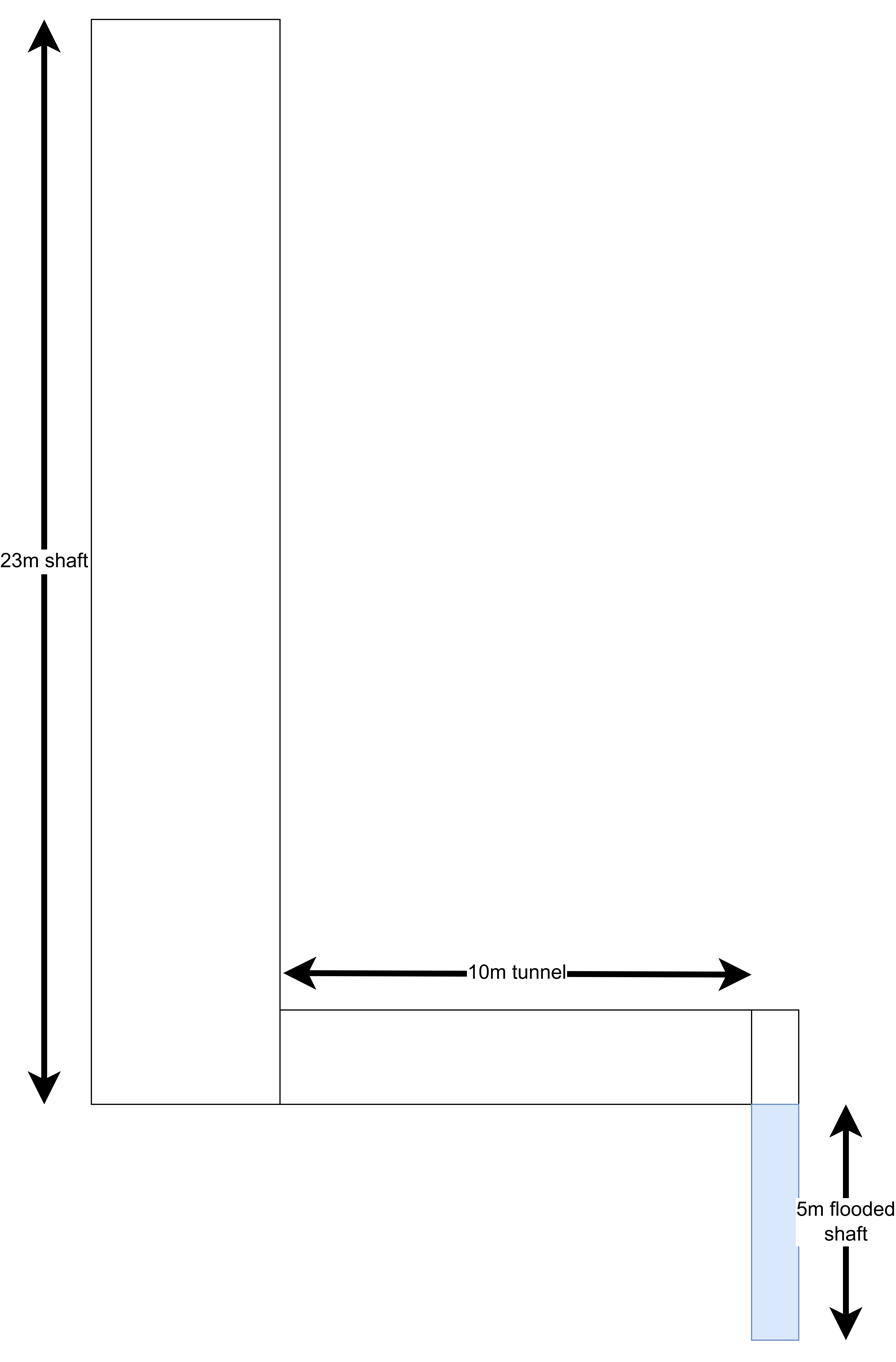
A diagram of the underground section of the pumping station

The Mgarr ix-Xini Pumping Station is a now-defunct freshwater pumping station located in the Mgarr ix-Xini valley, which used to provide much of the water for the island of Gozo, Malta. In the late 1880s, Lieutenant Governor Hely-Hutchinson requested an inspection of the water supply of Gozo by engineer Osbert Chadwick. Gozo was at the time dependent on water from natural springs and surface flow. Through observations of the vegetation growing in the deep Mgarr ix-Xini valley, Chadwick believed there was source of water close to the surface. Having had previous experience with pumping stations in Malta, he believed this source could be useful for the surrounding villages. Chadwick also reported springs in the vicinity of Ghajnsielem.

However, until 1887, there was no concern for the water supply in the region. The winter of 1887 changed this, the lack of precipitation during that year's winter caused a water famine. As a result, in January 1888, resident engineer Giorgio Costantino Schinas proposed that water be pumped from the previously mentioned spring at Ghajsnielem. This was chosen over pumping from Chadwicks proposed source in the Mgarr ix-Xini valley as no testing of the source had been conducted. However in 1896, the springs proved insufficient, and testing of the water source in the valley was pursued.

Ultimately Chadwick was proven correct and building of the water station commenced. Chambers were excavated into the south side of the valley, then connected to reservoirs. A bridge was erected over the valley to support a pipeline which led water to a reservoir in the high lying village of Nadur, another pipeline supplied water to a reservoir at Ta’ Cenc. The pumping mechanism was powered by coal, which in 1949 was replaced by an electrical system.

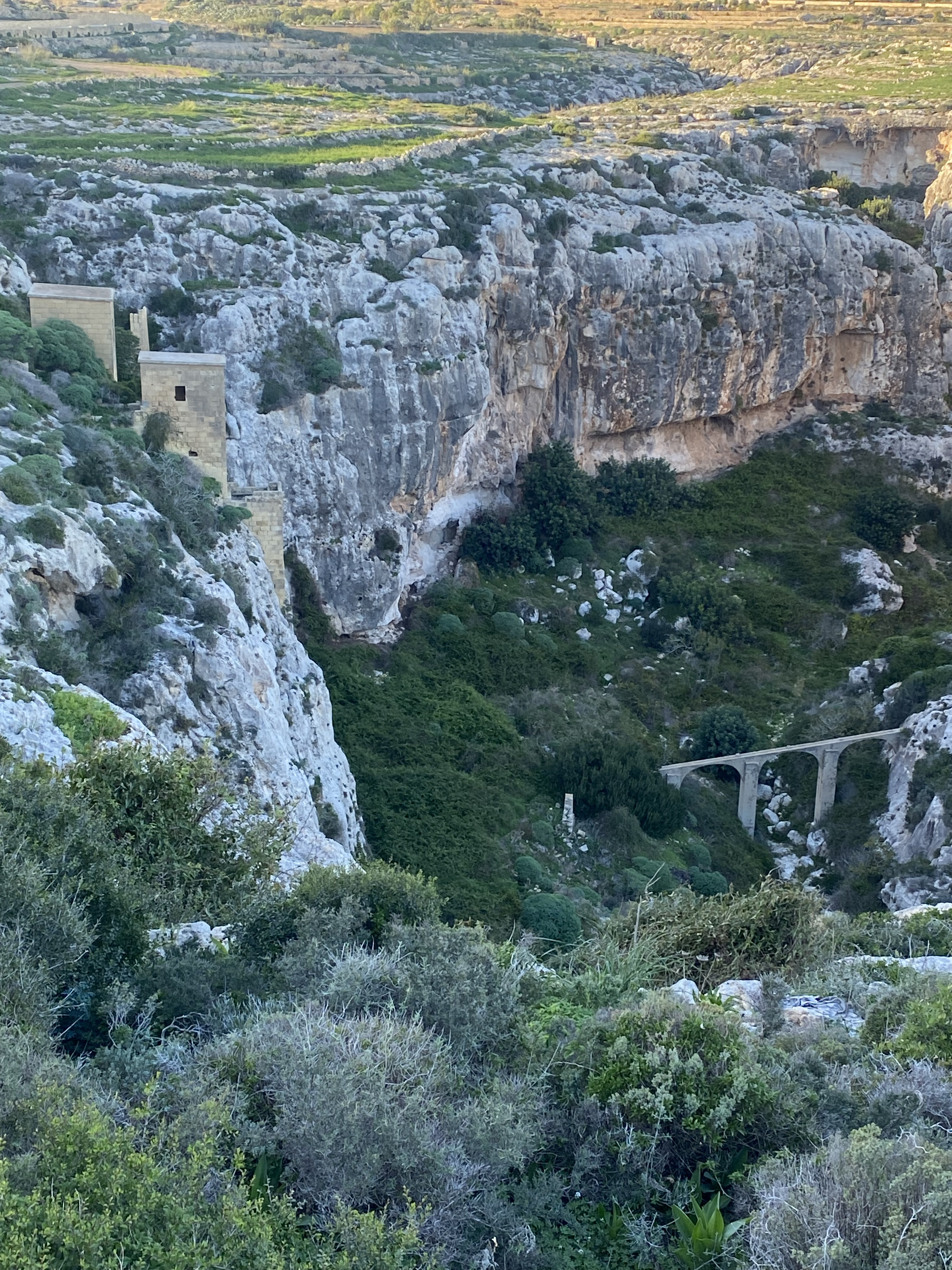
Mgarr ix-Xini Pumping Station
