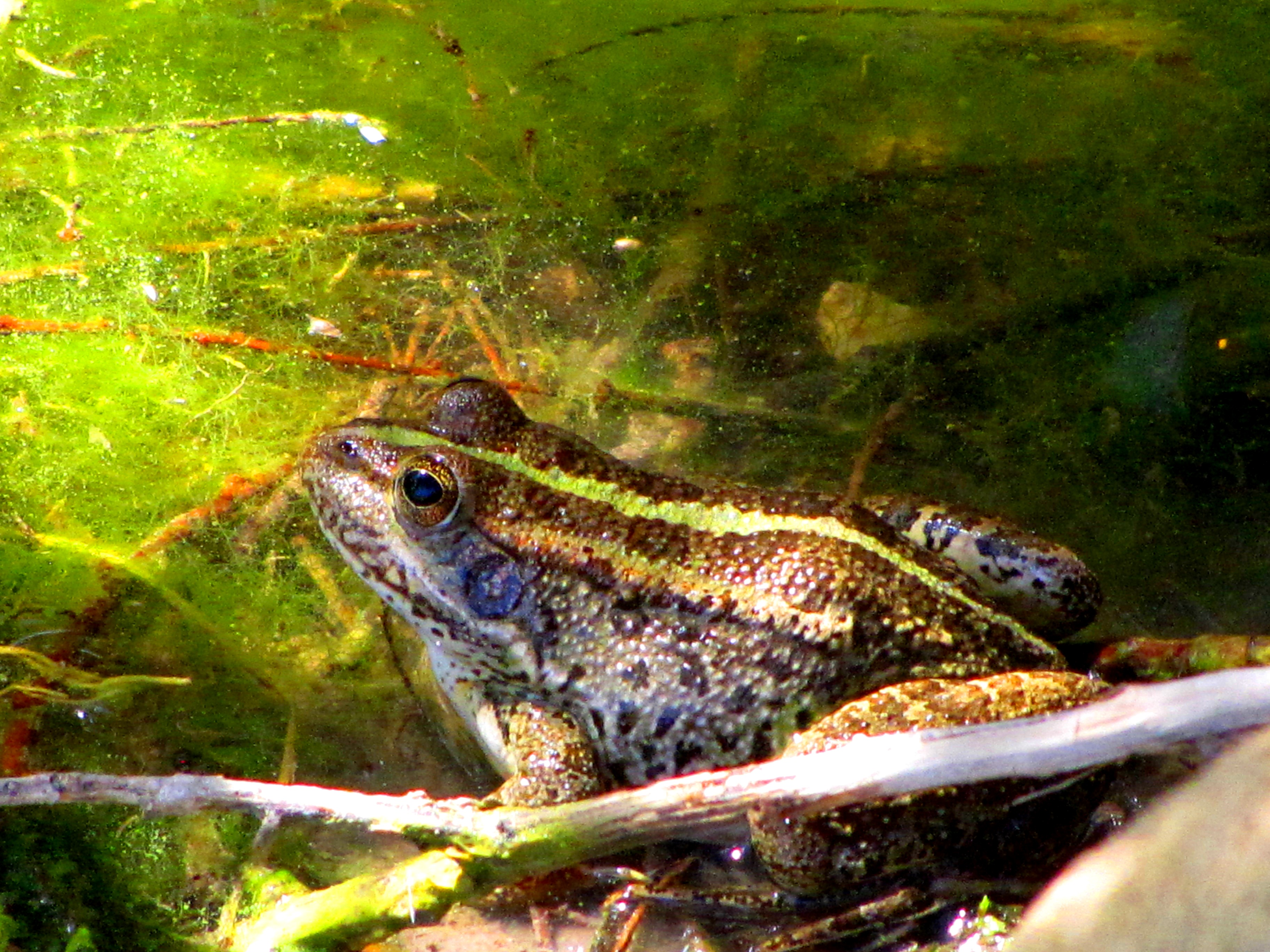
- Levant water frog at Saint Raphael Lake, Gozo, Malta

Conservation status
- Least Concern (IUCN 3.1)

Scientific classification
- Kingdom: Animalia
- Phylum: Chordata
- Class: Amphibia
- Order: Anura
- Family: Ranidae
- Genus: Pelophylax
- Species: P. bedriagae

Binomial name
- Pelophylax bedriagae (Camerano, 1882)

Synonyms
- Rana bedriagae Camerano, 1882

= Levant water frog =

Species of amphibian

The Levant water frog or Bedriaga's frog (Pelophylax bedriagae), formerly belonging to the genus Rana, is a southern European species of frog. They are green to brown in color with dark blotches on their dorsal side. They are cousins of the aquatic frogs and live most of the time in the water. They are not poisonous and are quite large, especially the females. It has been introduced in some countries where it was not native, one of which is Malta. First kept as a pet, then recently during the 1990s, it was deliberately introduced to a number of fresh water rock pools in Gozo, where in one it sustains a large population. Though a prolific and invasive species, it is restricted to constant fresh water supply, so it cannot spread naturally on its own on arid Mediterranean islands.

== Etymology ==
This species is named for herpetologist Jacques von Bedriaga.

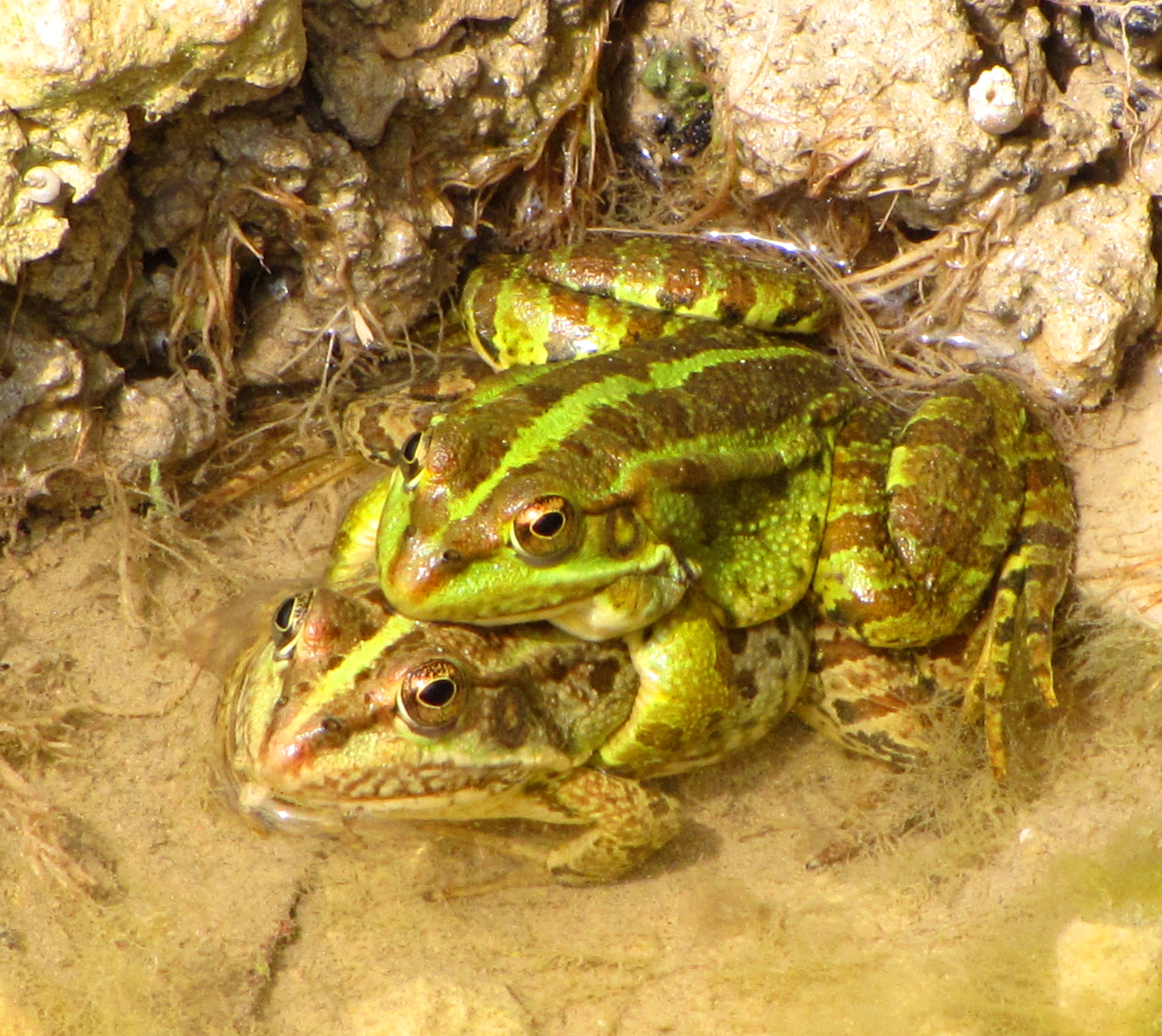
Mating pair
