= St Mary's Church, Mqabba =

Parish Church of the Assumption of Mary
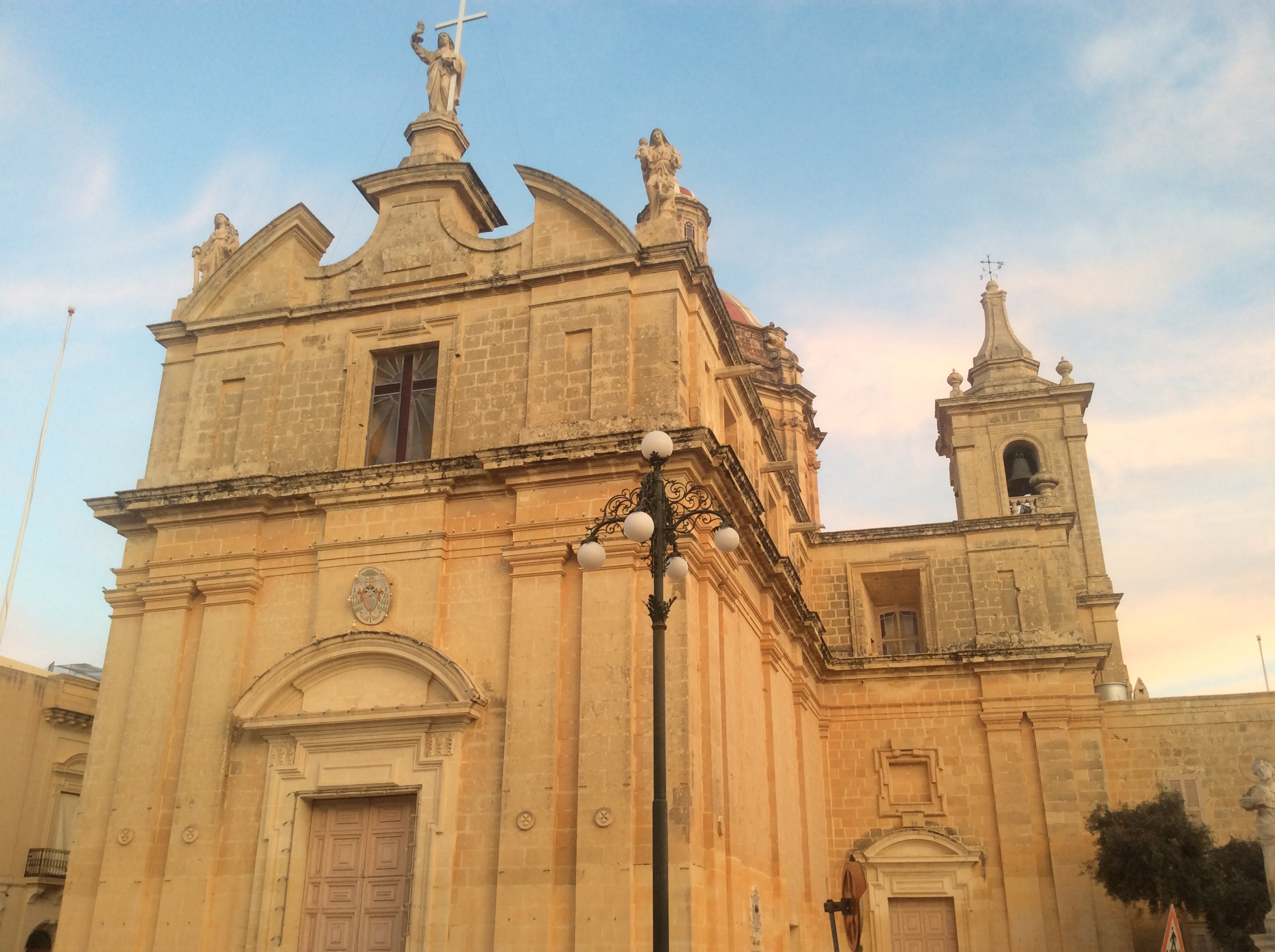
- Parish Church of the Assumption of Mary
- 35°50′43.6″N 14°28′01.4″E
- Location: Mqabba, Malta
- Denomination: Roman Catholic

History
- Status: Active
- Dedication: Assumption of Mary
- Dedicated: 20 May 1744

Architecture
- Functional status: Parish Church
- Architectural type: Baroque
- Groundbreaking: 1663
- Completed: 1699

Specifications
- Materials: Limestone

Administration
- Archdiocese: Malta
- Parish: Mqabba

Clergy
- Priest: Fr. Blake Camilleri

The Church of St Mary or more formally, the Parish church of the Assumption of Mary is a Roman Catholic parish church located in the southern village of Mqabba in Malta.

== History ==
The parish of Mqabba was created in 1598 and the Church of St Basil was chosen as the new parish church. Construction on the new church commenced in 1663. The parish title was transferred to the newly built church of the Assumption in 1699. The new church was built on the site of two chapels, one dedicated to the Assumption of Mary and the other to the Annunciation, mentioned by inquisitor Pietro Dusina in 1575 during his apostolic visit. The new church was dedicated to the Assumption, as was one of the chapels, while the chapel of the Annunciation was commemorated by an altar in the new church. The church was severely damaged during WWII. Damage included the collapse of the dome and the roof of the southern transept. Renovation works took place and were completed by 1947.

== Plans ==
The church is built in the form of a Latin cross with a nave, a choir and two transepts, on to the north and the other to the south of the church.
