= Mqabba =

Mqabba L-Imqabba Micabbiba
- Local council
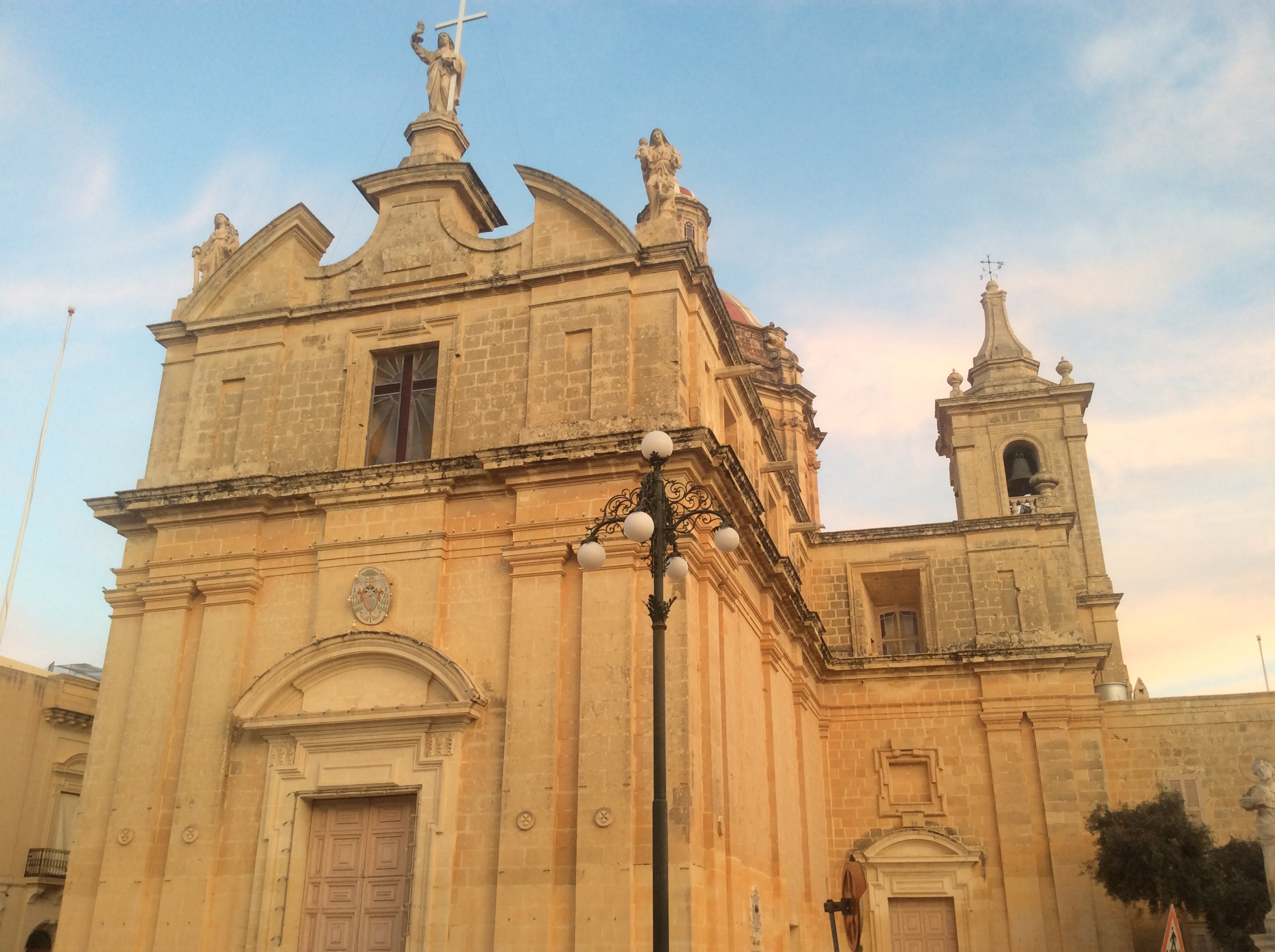
- Assumption of Our Lady, parish church of Mqabba

- Flag Coat of arms
- Motto: Non Nisi Per Ardua
- Coordinates: 35°50′39″N 14°28′1″E
- Country: Malta
- Region: Western Region
- District: South Eastern District
- Borders: Kirkop, Luqa, Qrendi, Siġġiewi, Żurrieq

Government
  - Mayor: Omar Farrugia (PL)

Area
  - Total: 2.6 km^{2} (1.0 sq mi)

Population (Jul. 2024)
  - Total: 3,714
  - Density: 1,400/km^{2} (3,700/sq mi)
- Demonym(s): Mqabbi (m), Mqabbija (f), Mqabbin (pl)
- Time zone: UTC+1 (CET)
  - Summer (DST): UTC+2 (CEST)
- Postal code: MQB
- Dialing code: 356
- ISO 3166 code: MT-33
- Patron saint: Assumption of Mary
- Website: Official website

Mqabba (Maltese: L-Imqabba) is a town in the Western Region of Malta. It has a traditional Maltese village layout. The focal point is the Parish Church of the Assumption, found at the core of the village. It has two band clubs, a number of gardens and a list of national monuments. The motto of the village is 'Non Nisi Per Ardua' which translates into 'Only with Ability'. The population of Mqabba was 3,714 in July 2024. This included 1,922 males and 1,792 females; 3,420 Maltese nationals and 294 foreign nationals.

== About ==
Mqabba was built around the Parish Church, the landmark of the village. The church is dedicated to the Assumption, with its feast being held every 15 August. The feast of Our Lady of Lilies (Madonna tal-Gilju) is celebrated on the third Sunday of June. There is also the feast of St Mary (Santa Marija).

The two band clubs of the village are situated in the piazza. The village feasts are popular with the residents. Other feasts celebrated are the feast of the Immaculate Conception, Our Lady of Sorrows, Corpus Domini and Our Lady of the Holy Rosary.

Other landmarks in the village include chapels dedicated to the Lady of Sorrows, Saint Basil, Saint Michael and Saint Catherine. Mqabba also has 139 cubic metres (4,909 cubic feet) of catacombs which were discovered in the 1860s. Important structures include the Vincenti Tower.

The importance of Mqabba is shown by the archaeological remains found in the vicinity. Extinct animals were found in quarries at Ta' Kandja and "Tax-Xantin".

Late pre-historic Neolithic until Tarxien periods burials in a natural cave are found in the peripheries of Mqabba, in a site known as "Bur Meghez", in the whereabouts of Tan-Naxxari Quarry. (See also)

One of the most important discoveries in Mqabba is the Paleo Christian "Mintna Catacombs" found in Diamond Jubilee Square in 1860 by Dr. A. A. Caruana and Capt Strickland. The ritual table known as the "Agape" table dominates the whole structure of tombs. Archaeological details were studied by Mayr. Becker, Zammit and Bellanti.

The main church is dedicated to Assumption of Our Lady and its feast is celebrated on 15 August. The feast of the Immaculate Conception is celebrated on the nearest Sunday to 8 December. The feast of Our Lady of the Lilies is celebrated on the third Sunday of June.

The church houses a significant titular statue, depicting the Assumption of the blessed Mother of God, which was crafted by Alessandro Farrugia in 1836. The statue bears resemblance to the wooden Assumption statue found in Ghaxaq. The accompanying photograph showcases the statue in its original form, prior to 1928 when the original wooden sarcophagus, depicted in the picture, was replaced by a new silver one. Despite this change, the statue itself has retained all of its distinctive characteristics.

The Assumption of Mary is celebrated on 15 August, and is also celebrated in Qrendi, Gudja, Ghaxaq, Mosta, Attard and Victoria (Gozo). It is all celebrated in the same day, as a tradition.

=== Fireworks displays ===
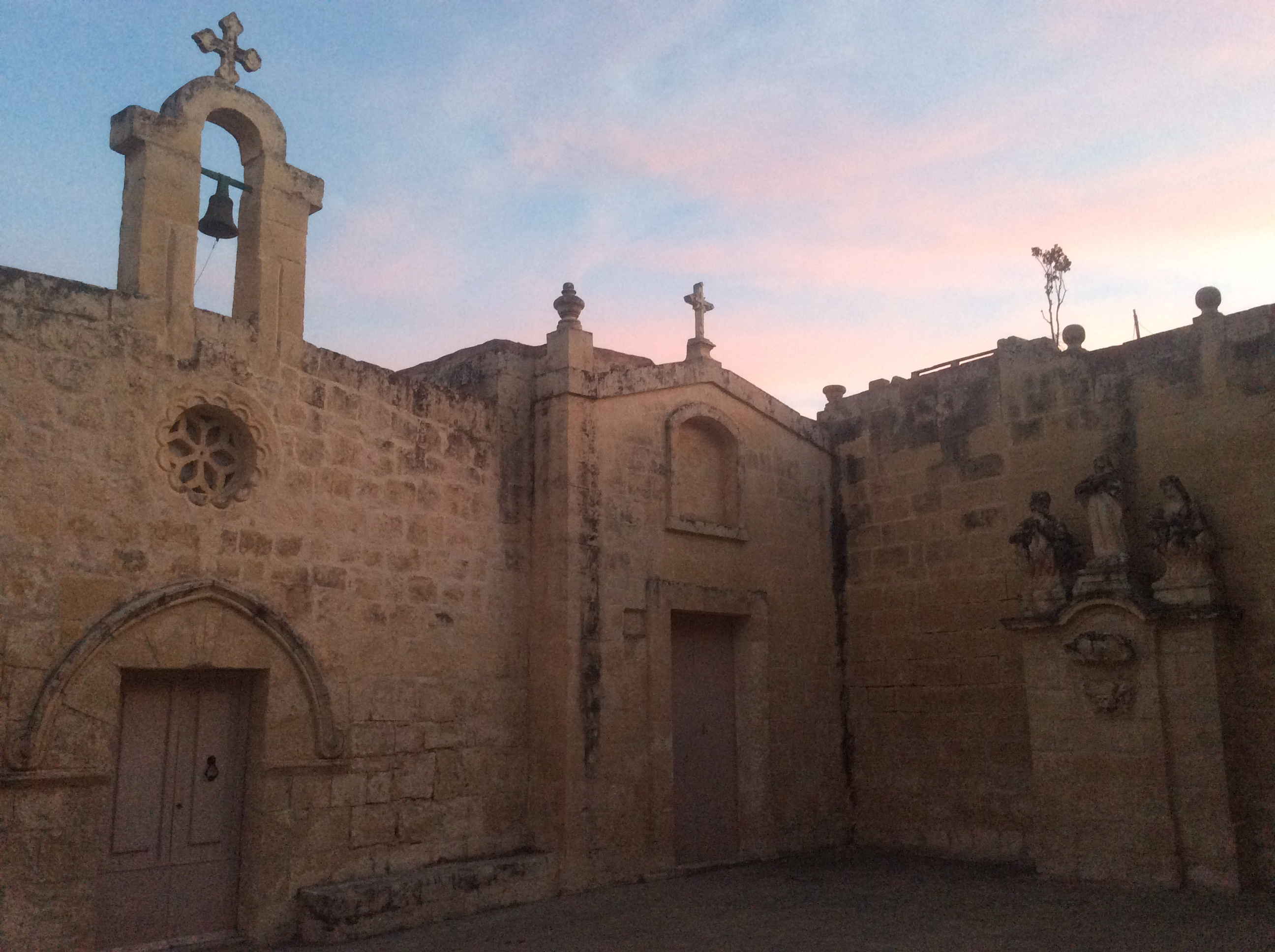
Chapels of St Basil and St Michael, respectively

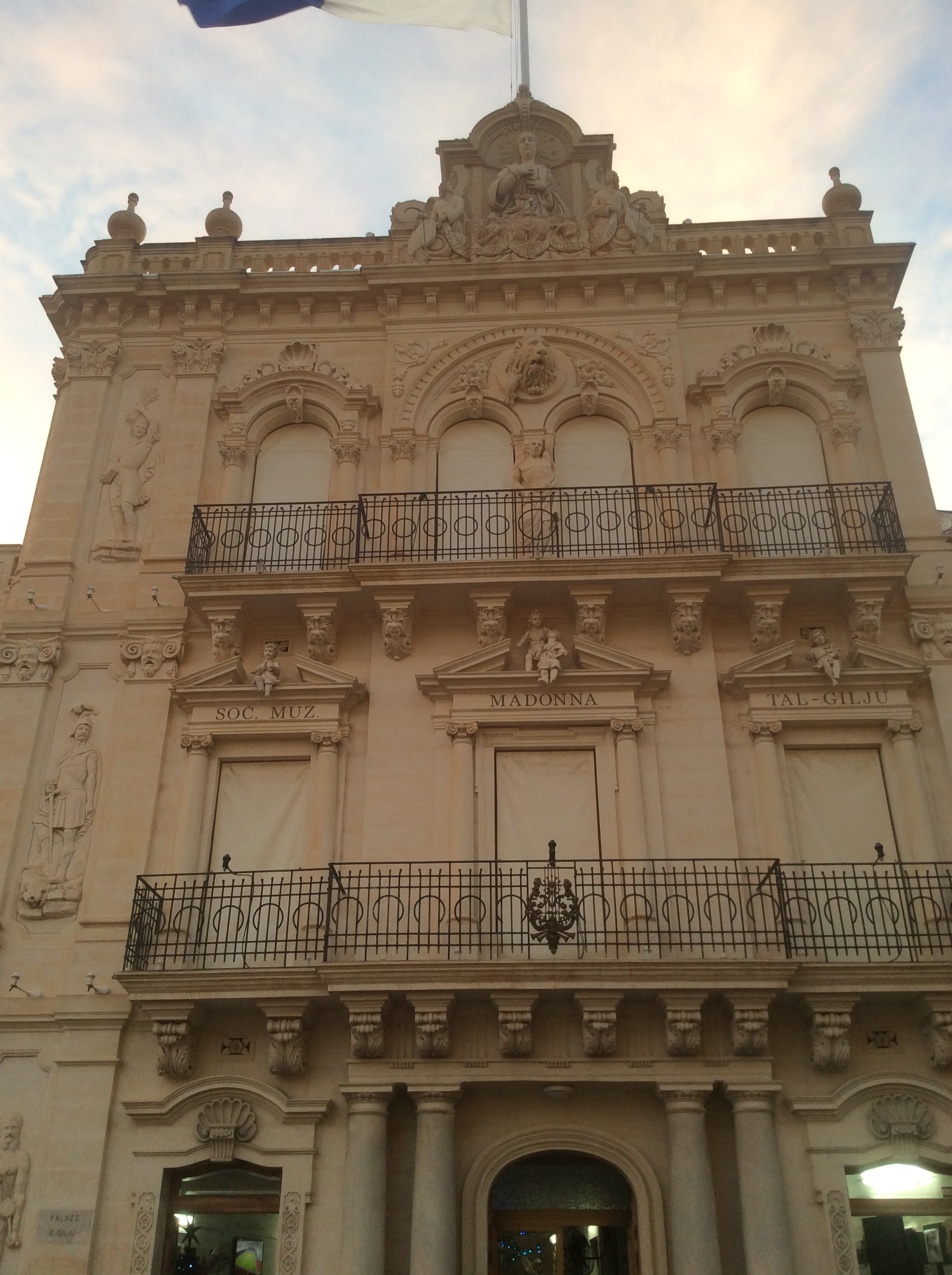
Palazz Il-Gilju

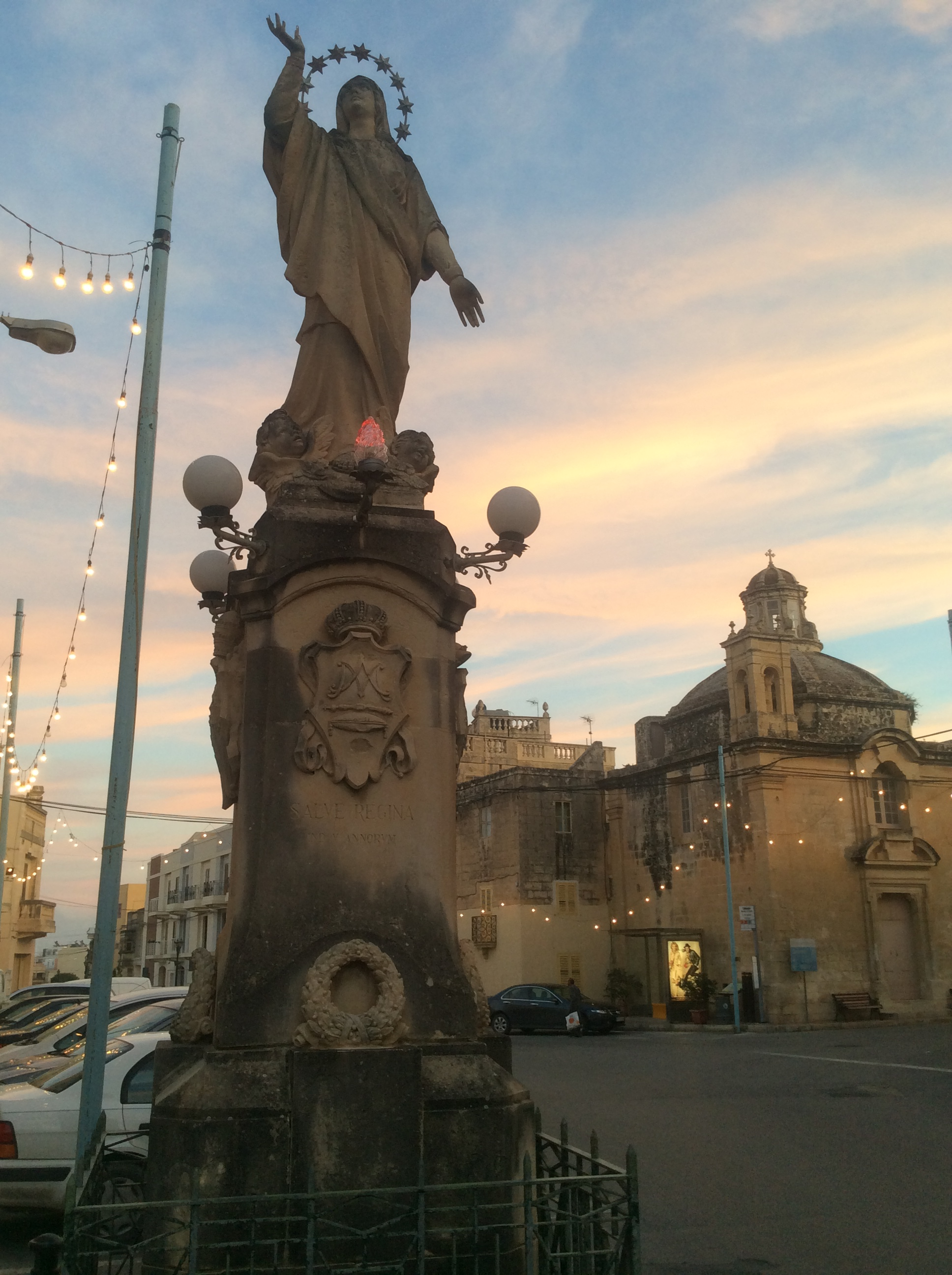
St. Catherine niche and St. Catherine Chapel on the right

The parish feast which is organised between 8 and 15 August brings to Mqabba fireworks enthusiasts as the St. Mary Fireworks Factory. The group won the first edition of the Malta International Fireworks Festival in 2006 and brought the most important honour in the village's history when it won the Caput Lucis Fireworks World Championships in 2007, in Valmontone a province of Rome in Italy after competing with seven of the world's most successful firework companies.

The secondary feast fireworks displays occur annually during the third week of June, as part of the Feast in Honour of Our Lady of Lilies. Both ground and aerial fireworks displays are organized each day throughout the Feast. The highlight is the main fireworks event held on the Saturday, the eve of the Feast.

A self-propelled vertical firework wheel (a Catherine wheel) with a 32-metre (105 ft) diameter was fired on 18 June 2011. It was designed by The Lily Fireworks Factory for the eve of the village's feast of Our Lady of Lilies.

=== International awards ===
- Les Etoile d'Or du Jumelage in 1998 (European Union award for twinning) - achieved by the King George V Band within the Society of St. Mary and King George V Band Club Mqabba for a twinning with the Corpo Bandistico Santa Vittoria in Matenano a province of Ascoli-Piceni in Italy.
- The Malta International Fireworks Festival in 2006 won by the St. Mary Fireworks Factory Mqabba
- Caput Lucis - 'Campionato Mondiale di Fuochi d'Artificio d'Autore' in 2007 won by the St. Mary Fireworks Factory Mqabba
- Guinness World Records for the largest Catherine Wheel measured 32.044 m in diameter build by the Lily Fireworks Factory Mqabba on 18 June 2011.

=== National awards ===
- Won the National Competition for the decoration of the Band Clubs facade during Christmas
- Won National Live Crib Competition in 2007 by the Youth Section within the Society of St. Mary and King George V Band Club Mqabba
- Won II National Mechanised Ground Fireworks Festival in 2008, by the Lily Fireworks Factory Mqabba
- Won IV National Mechanised Ground Fireworks Festival in 2010, by the St. Mary Fireworks Factory Mqabba
- Won Premju Ġieħ l-Artiġjanat Malti 2015 for a Three Dimensional Ground fireworks piece by the St. Mary Fireworks Factory Mqabba

== Zones in Mqabba ==
- Ħajt tal-Matla
- Ħal Millieri
- Mintna
- Ta' Kandja
- Tal-Ħaġra
- Tal-Landier
- Tal-Wilġa
- Tas-Sejba
- Tax-Xantin
- Tax-Xatba l-Ħamra

== See also ==
- Mqabba F.C.
