= Mġarr ix-Xini =

Bay on the Maltese island of Gozo

- L-Imġarr ix-Xini
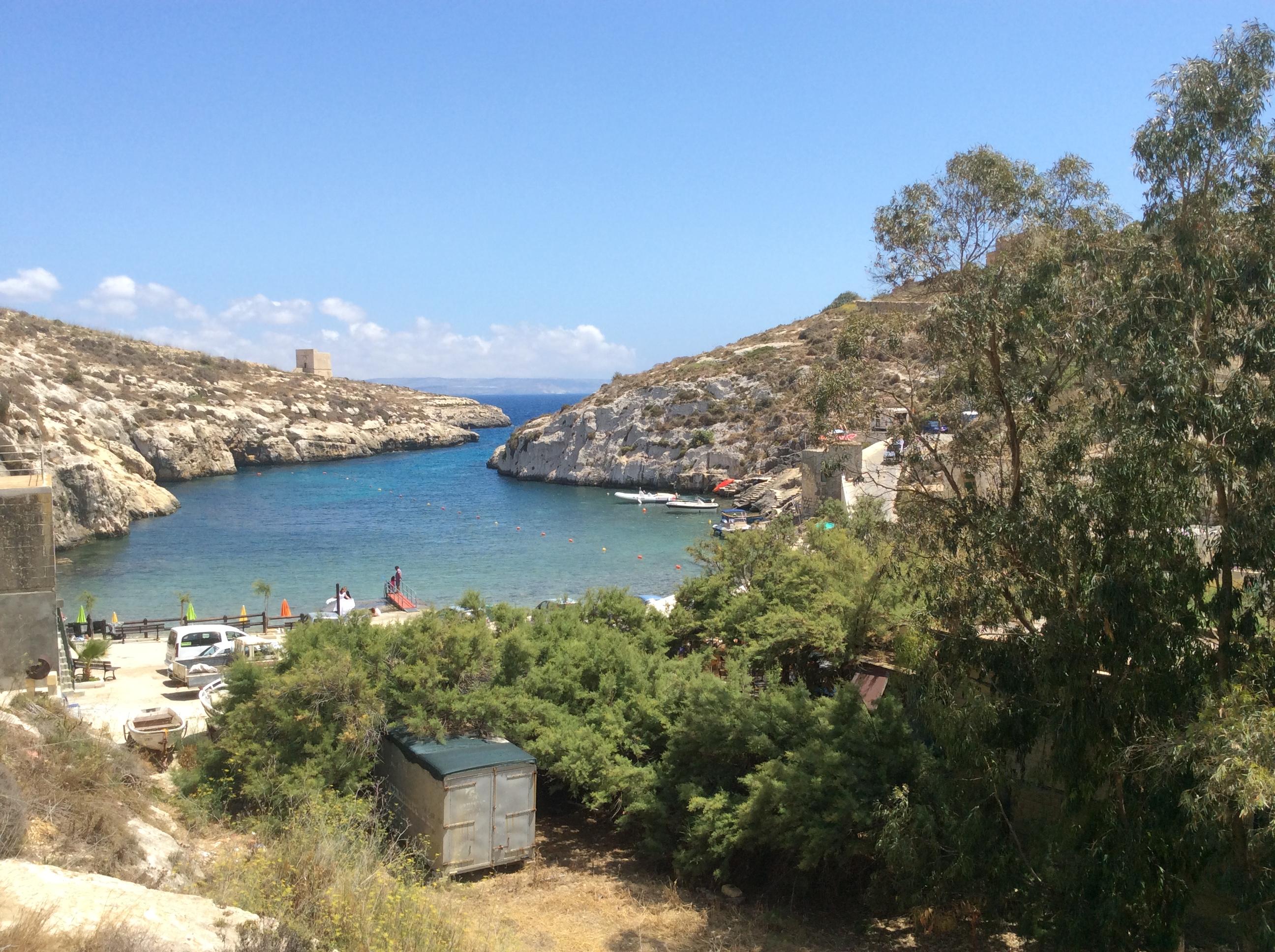
- Mġarr ix-Xini bay
- Interactive map of Mġarr ix-Xini
- Location: Gozo, Malta
- Coordinates: 36°01′14.23″N 14°16′16.68″E
- Type: Bay
- Part of: Gozo Channel, Mediterranean Sea
- Primary inflows: Springs
- Basin countries: Malta
- Max. length: 380 metres (1,250 ft)
- Max. width: 70 metres (230 ft)
- Surface area: 2,000 square metres (0.49 acres)
- Average depth: 16.4 metres (54 ft)
- Max. depth: 49.9 metres (164 ft)
- Water volume: 436,240 cubic metres (436,240,000 L)
- Shore length^{1}: 880 metres (2,890 ft)
- Surface elevation: 0 metres (0 ft)
- ^{1} Shore length is not a well-defined measure.

Mġarr ix-Xini (Maltese: Imġarr ix-Xini), is a bay close to Għajnsielem (southwest), Xewkija and Sannat (southeast) on the Maltese island of Gozo. It lies in a gorge to the west of Mġarr Harbour, accessible mainly from the nearest village of Xewkija as well from Sannat.

== History ==
During the rule of the Order, it served as a small harbour for galleys. A small watchtower was built to defend the area in 1661, and it was restored several times in recent years.

The Mgarr ix-Xini Pumping Station, located in a nearby valley, used to supply much of Gozo's water.

== Present Day ==
Nowadays, this secluded spot is popular for swimming and diving. On 12 November 1999, the former Gozo ferry MV Xlendi was purposely sunk to create an artificial reef and dive site. However, the ship rolled over while sinking and it ended up upside down. It may be unsafe for inexperienced divers.

The movie titled By the Sea, starring Angelina Jolie and Brad Pitt was partially filmed at Mġarr ix-Xini from August to November 2014.

Mġarr ix-Xini (Malta)
