= Our Lady of Sorrows Chapel, Mqabba =

Chapel of Our Lady of Sorrows
- Kappella tal-Madonna tad-Duluri
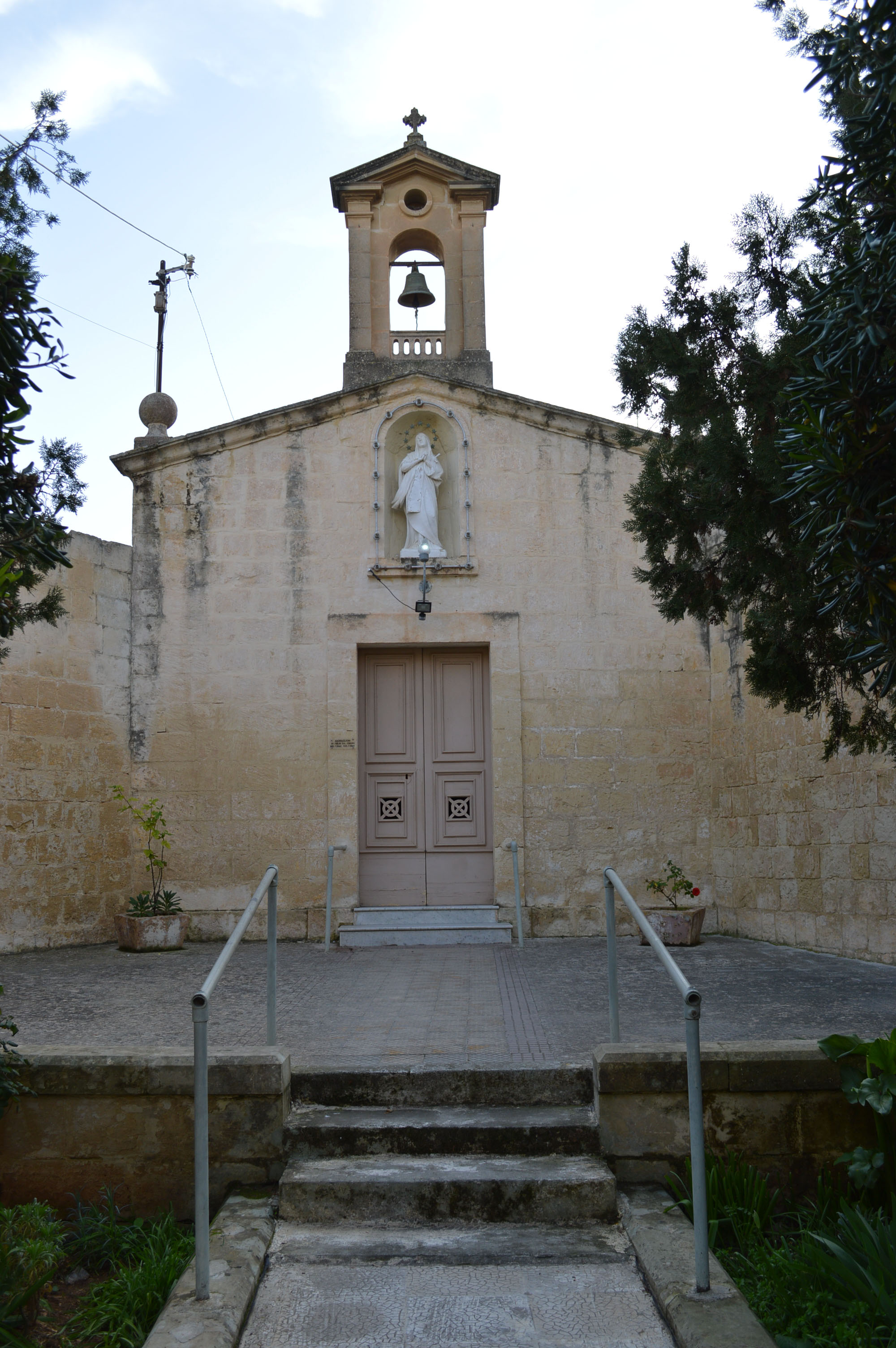

- Location within Malta
- 35°50′44.0″N 14°27′57.1″E
- Location: Mqabba
- Country: Malta
- Denomination: Roman Catholic

History
- Former name: Assumption of Mary
- Status: Active
- Founded: Prior 1500
- Dedication: Our Lady of Sorrows

Architecture
- Functional status: Church
- Groundbreaking: 1679
- Completed: 1680

Administration
- Archdiocese: Malta
- Parish: Mqabba

The Chapel of Our Lady of Sorrows is a 17th-century Roman Catholic church located in the village of Mqabba, in Malta.

== History ==
The original chapel, dedicated to the Assumption of Mary referred to as Tal-Faqqanija, was built prior to 1500. During the plague of 1592–93 the cemetery in front of the chapel was used to bury people who died because of the plague. Nowadays the cemetery no longer exists. On December 7, 1600, Bishop Tommaso Gargallo visited the chapel and ordered that the wall around the cemetery should be reconstructed. However this was not done as 15 years later, Bishop Baldassare Cagliares found the wall in the same condition as described by Gargallo.

In 1679, Bishop Miguel Jerónimo de Molina ordered the rebuilding of the chapel as it was deemed too small to serve the faithful. The chapel was rebuilt in 1680 through the initiatives of two priests. Nonetheless, the church was abandoned some years later until 1814 when it was handed over to the care of Dr Giovanni Schembri who restored it and changed the dedication to Our Lady of Sorrows. During WWII the chapel was used as a school and was also damaged. The belfry was rebuilt after the war.
