= Saint Raphael Lake =

Coordinates: 36°02′11.97″N 14°11′56.83″E

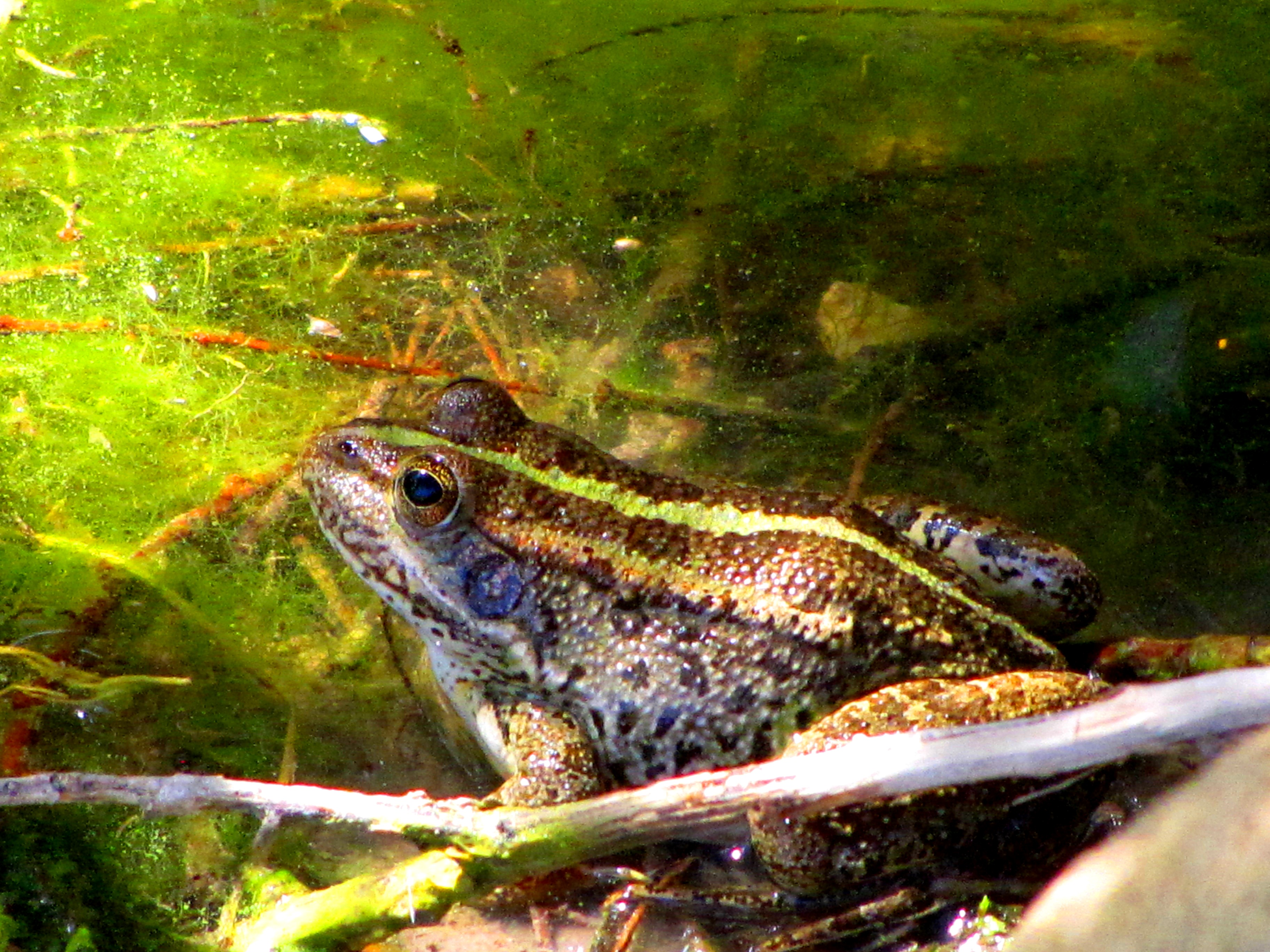
Levant water frog at San Raflu

Saint Raphael Lake (San Raflu) is a small rural area just outside the locality of Kerċem, at the south-west of the island of Gozo in Malta. The area is approximately 148 m (486 ft) above sea level and 350 m (1,150 ft) (vertical distance) away from the sea. The area is surrounded by two of the most important bays in Gozo: Dwejra Bay to the northwest and the Xlendi Bay to the southeast.

The area is situated on layers of Upper, Middle and Lower Globigerina limestone (Maltese: Franka ta’ Fuq, tan-Nofs u ta’ Taħt), which make up the base of the whole San Raflu area. However, one also finds traces of Coralline limestone rock, which also makes up the Xlendi Cliffs. The high amount of limestone in the area also influences the soil, which is mainly xerorendzinas, a main characteristic of the Globigerina areas. In fact, this soil is a compound of the Globigerina limestone, the greensand, and several other organic material, and has very high levels of stone and chalk content, whilst keeping a very low level of humus. This type of soil is mostly common in the southern parts of Gozo, but however, it is still considered widespread around the island.

== History ==
The area has always been a centre for agricultural activity, which has grown in the 20th century. The area is called San Raflu or Sarraflu most probably after the archangel Raphael, although the reason for this is unknown. The area centers around a man made hole which gathers water and is home to several different marine organisms. Since 1981, a spring festival, called the Fiera tal-Għadira (Għadira Festival) is held every year on the first Sunday after Easter, and in which several agricultural produce and farm animals are sold to the public. However, in general, one may conclude that the area has always been quite slow and quiet, perhaps with the exception of the quarrying industry, which for some years has been present in the area, and which is still active presently.

== Biodiversity ==
=== Flora ===
The area boasts of a diversity of flora and fauna throughout the year, making it an ecological place of high importance. This is because the soil is quite fertile, and that there are several patches of land which are left unused, and therefore it is very easy for wildlife to regenerate and grow. The species, especially the plants vary also in their type, as we find indigenous, endemic, and also alien or introduced species, as depicted in the table below.

Out of nine common species found in the area, four are indigenous, two are endemic, and two are introduced. This is the most clear proof of the flora diversity, and its importance not only in Gozo, but also in the Maltese Islands in general. One should also note that the Sicilian Marigold is only found in Gozo in the San Raflu and Xlendi Areas, along with some other area in Malta. This increases the ecological importance of the area in respect of the flora.

=== Fauna ===
Although rich in flora and plant species, the San Raflu Area does not prosper in fauna diversity, chiefly due to the human impact on the area. However, one may conclude there are mainly fresh water forms of life, such as ducks, turtles, fish, and frogs.

Ducks have been present in the area since the man-made depressions were first created. However, the species were most probably introduced through human interference, and not by natural means. This theory is supported by the fact the species found in the pond are always changing, hinting out that persons could have introduced them there. Amongst the species there are the Garganey, the Eurasian Wigeon and the Northern Pintail.

Although some say that the presence of goldfish was reported in the pond, there has certainly been an introduction of an alien species of fish, the Gambusia Holbrooki, also known as the Eastern mosquitofish. This species has been definitely introduced in the area, as it is most commonly found in the Americas and Australia, where they were introduced to decrease the mosquito population.

Originally, the Maltese native frog (Discoglossus pictus) inhabited the pond, but today an alien species almost completely ruined and replaced it. This is the Rana Bedriagae or Bedriaga's Frog which, according to sources was introduced by human means in the late 1990s and which managed to establish a permanent population in the San Raflu Area. Today, this species has been classified as one with a potential danger to the Maltese frog.

== Human interference ==
=== Farming industry ===
Farming has always been present in the area, due to the high fertility of the soil. Farmers have not done much changes to the area, but surely contributed in enriching the soil and maintaining it in place through the use of the Ħitan tas-Sejjieħ (rubble walls) and special trees also intended to prevent soil erosion. From what one can notice, the farming techniques used in the area are on the whole more primitive in respect of other agricultural area, and this may very positive, as contamination of the soil is being avoided.

=== Quarrying industry ===
Certainly, the quarrying industry is the most active in the area, with workers depending on it on a daily basis. It is also the one which has most interfered with the natural landscape of the area, as it was responsible for the demolition of stretches of garrigue and agricultural land. Therefore, the quarry contributed heavily to increasing the levels of soil erosion and dispersal in the area, whilst also ruining the natural landscape and environment.

=== Hunting ===
Hunting was a popular and uncontrolled activity till the late 1900s. However, with the enforcement of new laws and regulations this activity has decreased exponentially. The interference however has surprisingly increased, with hunting turrets and bird trapping cages causing a sudden blockage for the fauna and the flora, even causing them to stop growing in certain areas. The damage to the flora was also conducted through the planting of an alien breed of Eucalyptus trees, which are used to attract birds, and which are damaging the local plants and trees. The use of herbicides has also damaged the soil extensively.
