= St Catherine's Chapel, Mqabba =

St Catherine's Chapel
- The Church of St Catherine and St Peter
- Kappella ta' Santa Katerina
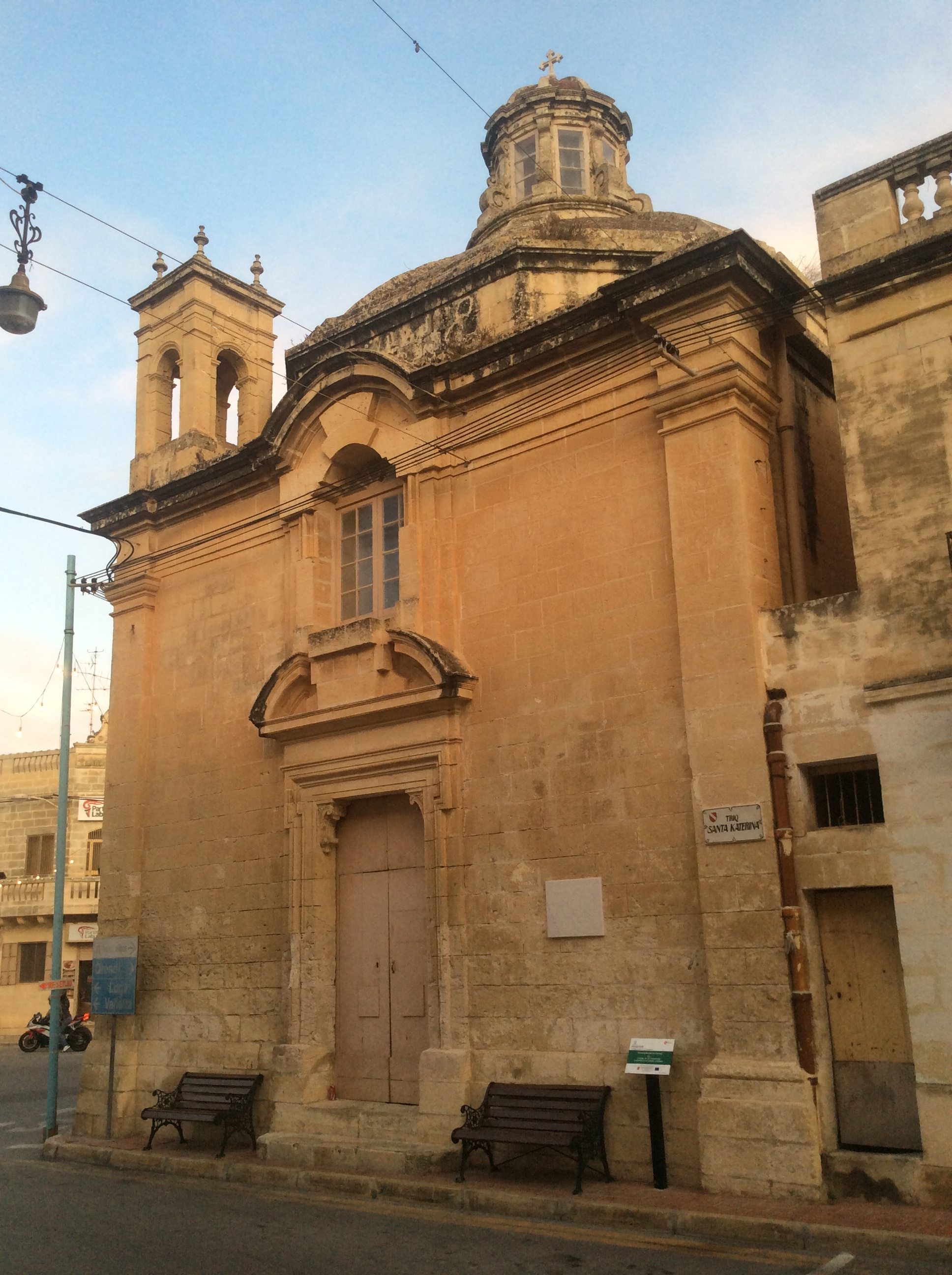

- Location within Malta
- 35°50′41.9″N 14°28′01.5″E
- Location: Mqabba
- Country: Malta
- Denomination: Roman Catholic

History
- Dedication: St Catherine of Alexandria; Saint Peter
- Dedicated: 1774

Architecture
- Groundbreaking: 1764
- Completed: 1774

Administration
- Archdiocese: Malta
- Parish: Mqabba

St Catherine's Chapel officially the Church of St Catherine and St Peter is an 18th-century Roman Catholic church located in Mqabba, Malta.

== Origins ==
The origins of this chapel are unknown. The chapel is mentioned by inquisitor Pietro Dusina during his apostolic visit to Malta in 1575. He mentioned that the chapel which he visited was built in 1550 however an older one existed. The chapel was built beside another chapel dedicated to St Peter. Dusina describes the chapel as lacking in numerous items and nearly bare. It had one altar and an icon of Our Lady with St Catherine and St Peter.

When the chapel was visited by Bishop Tommaso Gargallo in 1598, he found the chapel in a very good state equipped with all necessary items for the celebration of the liturgy. The chapel is mentioned once more in 1634 where it is noted that the chapel was equipped with one altar, wooden candle sticks, a cross, and an icon depicting Our Lady with St Catherine and St Andrew, indicating that the icon was a different one than the one described in 1575.

== Present chapel ==
In 1759 the chapel was in danger of collapsing and it was decided to demolish it together with the adjacent St Peter's chapel. Instead of them, one church was built. The cornerstone was inaugurated and blessed by the Parish priest Reverend Mikiel Giocomo Tortella in 1764. The chapel was completed 10 years later in 1774 and consecrated by the same parish priest on Easter Sunday. The church was dedicated to St Catherine of Alexandria and Saint Peter. The exterior of the church was built in the form of a square while the interior is circular. A baroque dome was also built. The chapel has one door and a large window on top of it. A bell tower was added sometime later.

Prior to WWII the church was used regularly however since then the church was used as a storage space for liturgical items. In 2004 the chapel was restored.

== Interior ==
The chapel has one stone altar painted to look like marble. The titular painting, depicting St Catherine, above the altar is from an unknown artist however it has the date 1776 painted in the bottom right corner. On the bottom left corner there are 4 letters: V.F.G.A. (Votum Fecerunt Gratiam Acceperunt) which mean Make a Vow and Grace Receive.
