= Vincenti Tower =

- Torri Vinċenti
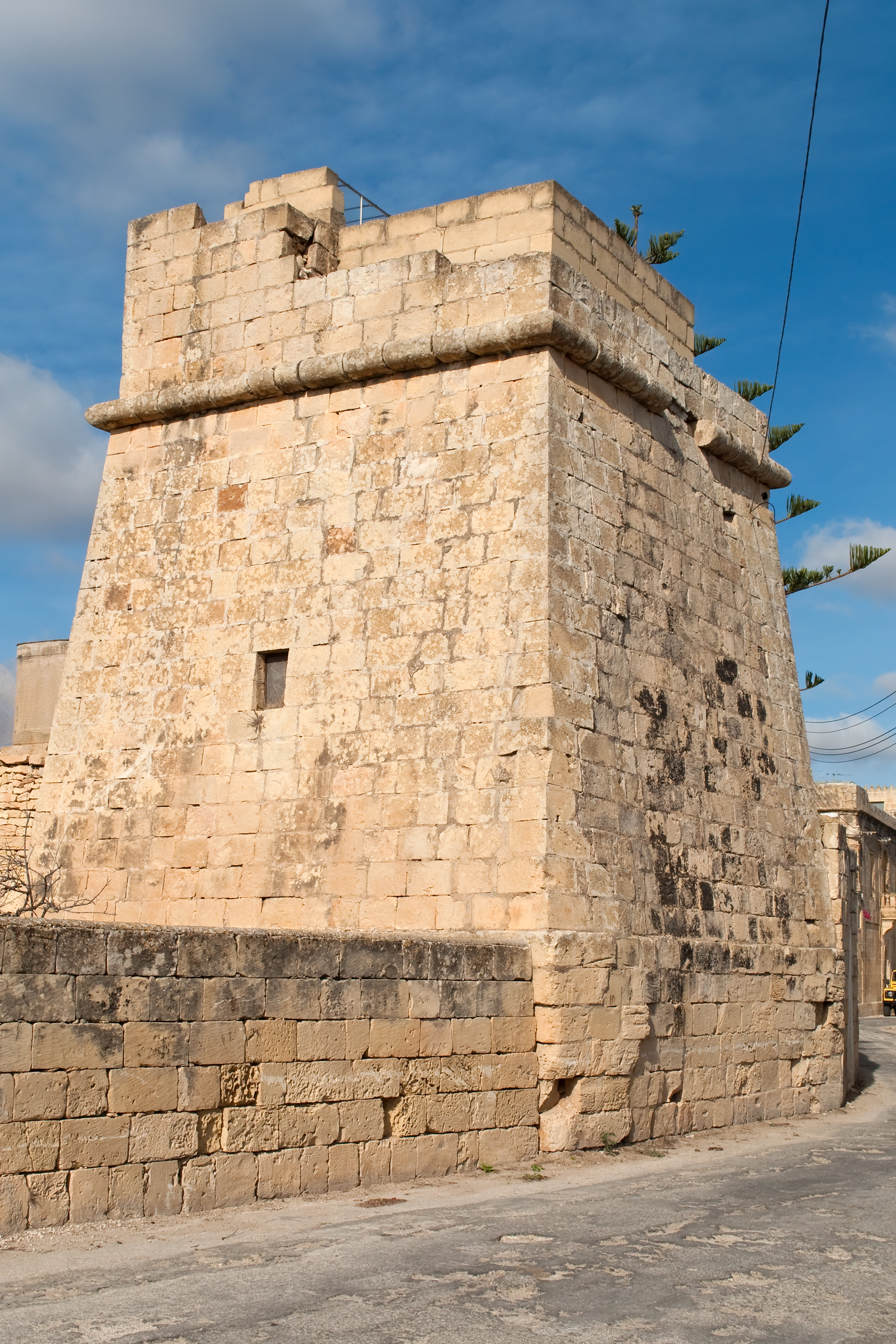
- View of the Vincenti Tower
- Interactive map of the Vincenti Tower area

General information
- Status: Partially intact
- Type: Fortified tower
- Location: Mqabba, Malta
- Coordinates: 35°50′51.9″N 14°28′5.2″E
- Named for: Fra Orfeo de Vincenzo
- Completed: 1726
- Demolished: 1940s (partially)
- Owner: Private

Technical details
- Material: Limestone
- Floor count: 4

Vincenti Tower (Maltese: Torri Vinċenti) is a tower in Mqabba, Malta. It was built in 1726 by Fra Orfeo de Vincenzo, a Prior of the Order of St. John. It forms part of a countryside residence, which also includes a palace/farmhouse known as Ta' Torri Spero, and a garden between the palace and the tower.

The tower was originally four stories high, with a balcony on its second floor, and it had a scarped base which made it somewhat similar to coastal watchtowers such as the De Redin towers. The tower had a coat of arms and an inscription commemorating its construction, but these are now lost.

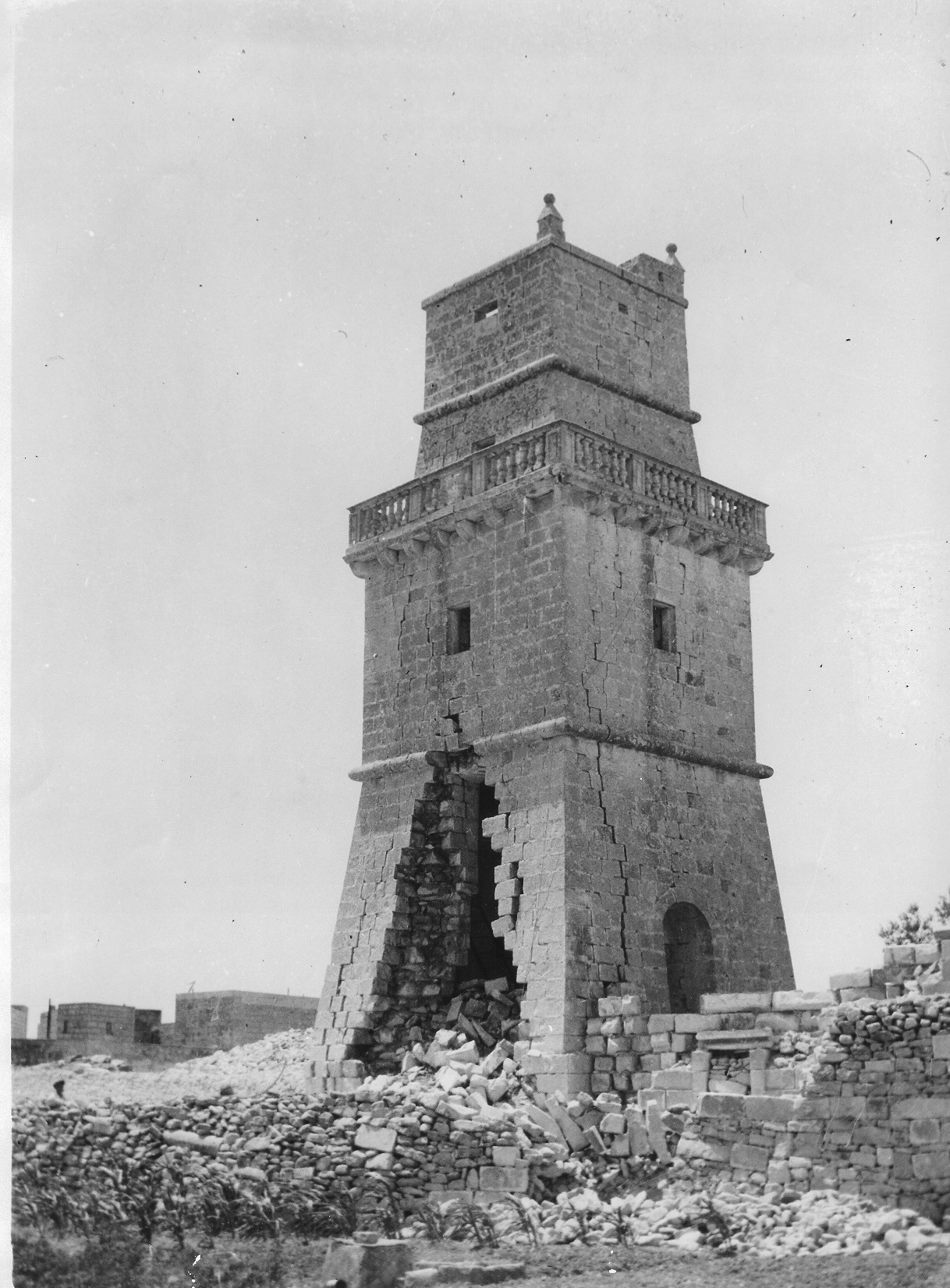
War-damaged Vincenti Tower in 1942

On 2 June 1941, during World War II, the British military requisitioned the tower from its owner Sir William John England, and used it as an observation post. It was prone to aerial bombardment due to its proximity to the RAF Luqa airfield. It was hit on 12 April 1942, and the bottom floor was substantially damaged although the structure did not collapse.

However, the Royal Air Force later decided to pull down the tower since it was deemed dangerous to the nearby airfield. The upper sections were pulled down, but the scarped ground floor and part of the first floor were retained.

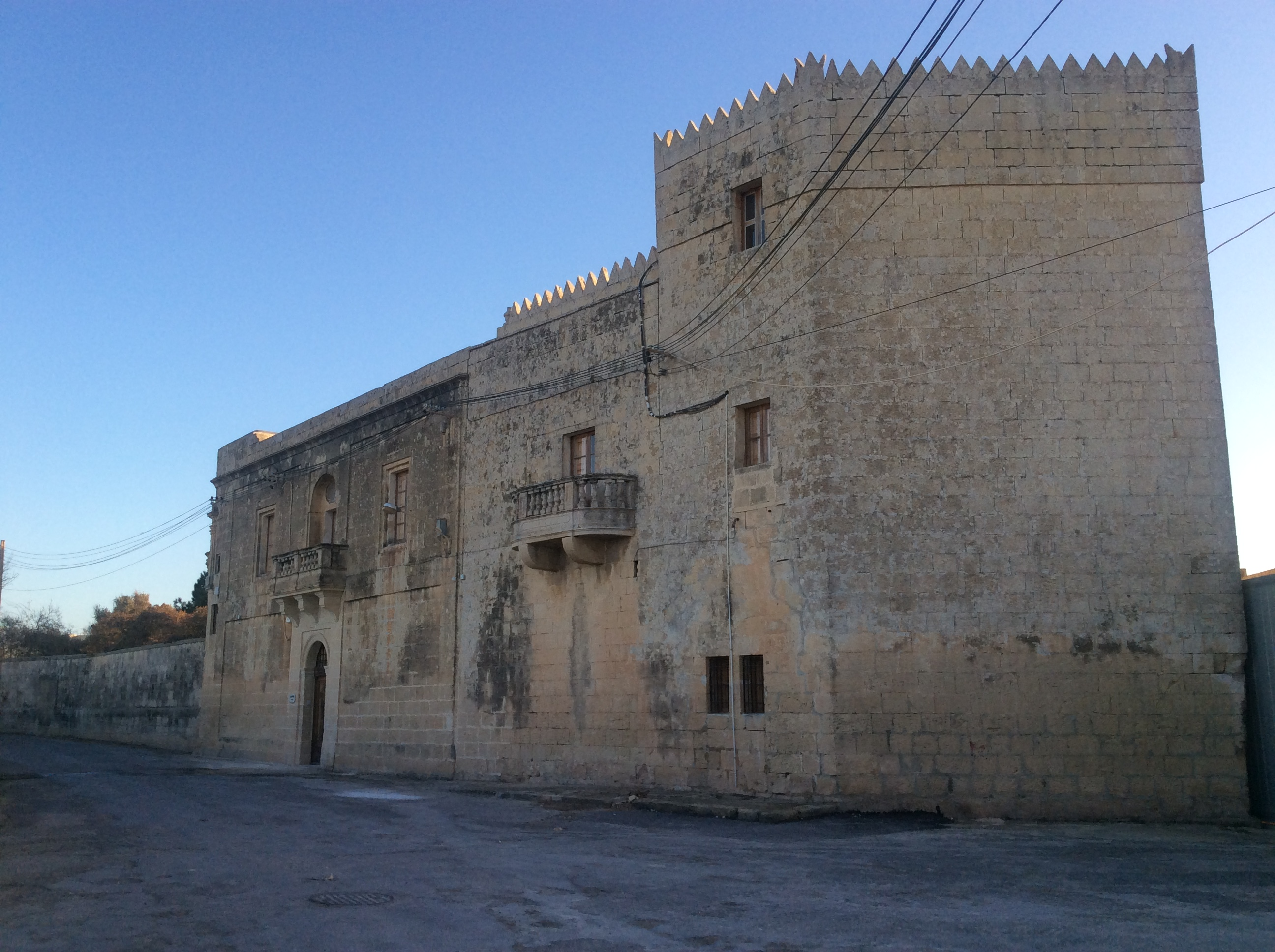
Ta' Torri Spero, a country residence which was built at the same time as the tower

Today, the remains of the tower as well as the nearby garden and farmhouse are private property. The tower was included on the Antiquities List of 1925 as "the old tower", and it was scheduled as a Grade 1 monument by the Malta Environment and Planning Authority in 1997. It is also listed on the National Inventory of the Cultural Property of the Maltese Islands.
