= Wied il-Kbir =

River valley

- Big Valley
- Location within Malta
- Floor elevation: 52 m (171 ft)
- Length: 1.8 km (1.1 mi)
- Width: 0.11 km (0.068 mi)
- Area: 0.19 km^{2} (0.073 mi^{2})

Geography
- Location: Birzebbuga, Malta
- Coordinates: 35°49′27″N 14°30′46″E
- Interactive map of Wied il-Kbir

Wied il-Kbir (English: Big Valley) is a wadi located in Birzebbuga, Malta. The name "Wied" indicates the existence of water although there is little water present due to a substantial amount of refuse being thrown into the valley causing rain water to head into the ocean. To combat this, catchments for water were planned between July 2022 and May 2021. The valley consists mostly of urban development and arable land, with 3% of it being dedicated to mineral extraction and natural areas.
