= Ta' Kandja =

Coordinates: 35.84944°N 14.46722°E

Ta' Kandja is a small area situated between Ħal Farruġ and Siġġiewi in Malta. The area, which is mainly composed of limestone quarries, comprises a small number of facilities, such as the Detention Centre housed by the Armed Forces of Malta and the Water Services Corporation's Groundwater Pumping Station.

== Ta' Kandja Galleries ==
There are underground galleries here that are part of the Maltese water supply system.

Ta’ Kandja Underground Galleries are around 100m below ground level and are an important source of ground water for Malta. This was the last pumping station built here, and was completed in 1963. Ta' Kandja consists of 6 galleries (around 6.2 km of galleries out of a network of 42 km), which are below the island's surface. These spread out from a sump like the spokes of a wheel, spreading out under villages in the area. Water collected in the sump area is chlorinated to eliminate any bacteria and then pumped to a reservoir in the nearby village of Qrendi.
