= Chapel of St Basil, Mqabba =

Chapel of St Basil
- The Church of St Basil the Great
- Kappella ta' San Bażilju
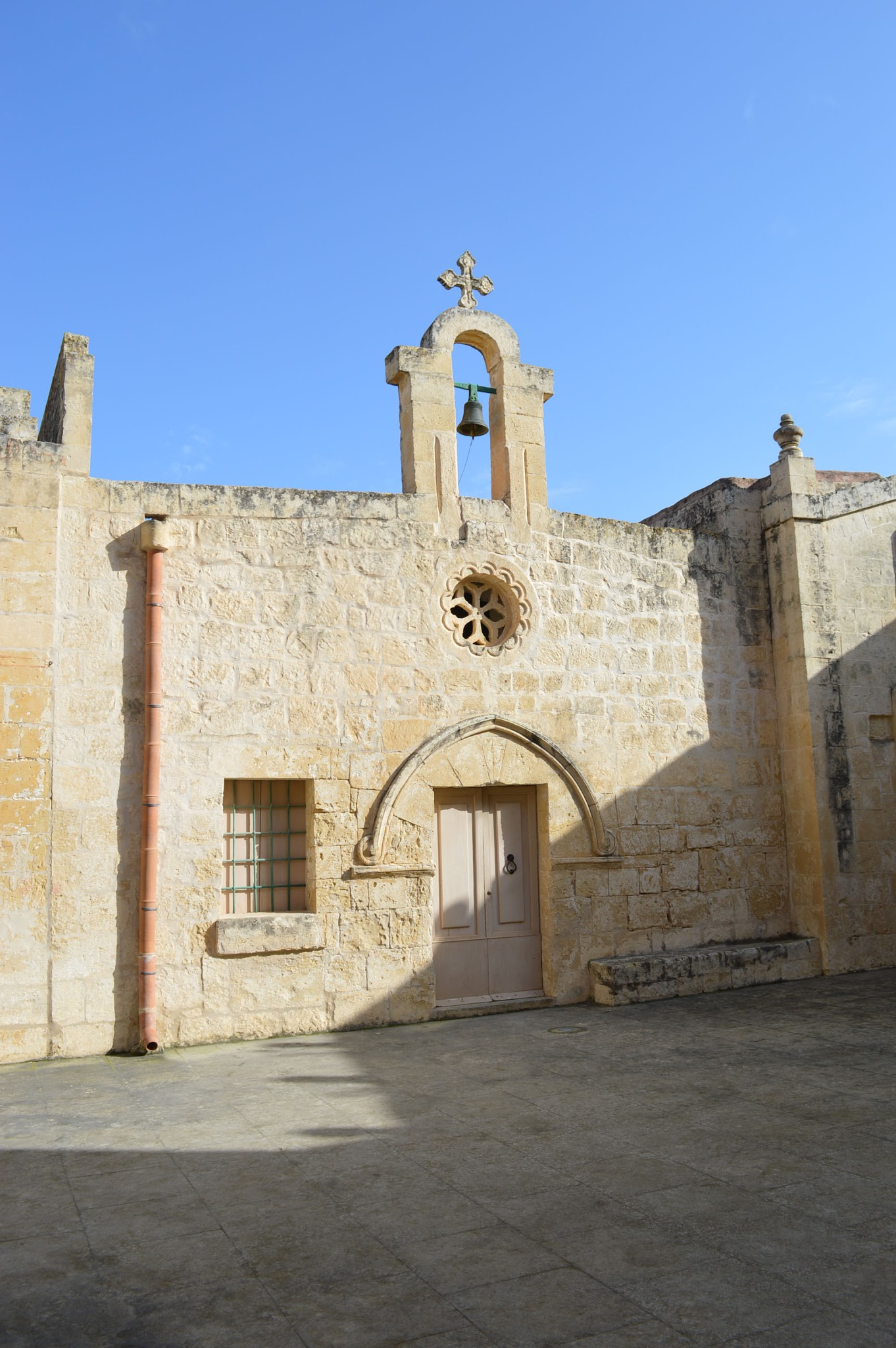
- The chapel in 2018
- Chapel of St Basil
- 35°50′43.2″N 14°28′04.8″E
- Location: Mqabba, Malta
- Denomination: Roman Catholic

History
- Status: Active
- Dedication: St Basil the Great

Architecture
- Functional status: Church
- Completed: 15th century

Specifications
- Materials: Limestone

Administration
- Archdiocese: Malta
- Parish: Mqabba

St Basil's Chapel is a Roman Catholic medieval church located in Mqabba, Malta. It is the only church building in Malta dedicated to St Basil the Great.

== History ==
This chapel was built in 1486 however it was enlarged three times. The present size of the chapel was completed by 1515, commemorated by the inscription of the date on the main painting of the chapel. In 1575 the chapel was visited by inquisitor Pietro Dusina on his apostolic visit to Malta who reported that it was the biggest church in Mqabba and that it had an altar, a main painting and wooden doors. In 1598, the church served as the parish church of Mqabba and was temporary renamed as St Mary's. In 1680 Bishop Miguel Jerónimo de Molina visited the church and commented that the church was important to the local people and that it was the main church of the village. In the plague epidemic of 1676, victims of the disease were buried both in and outside the church in the yard in front of the church which today is covered in concrete. During World War II as a result of the bombing of the parish church of the Assumption of Mqabba, the church of St Basil, once more, became the parish church of Mqabba. The church was restored in 2007.

== Interior ==
The chapel's interior consists of a number of pointed arches, typical to medieval church architecture. The painting above the high altar dates to 1677 however it lacks any artistic value. It depicts God the Father, Saint Joseph, Mary with Jesus, and the poor souls together with St Basil and Saint Roch. The year 1515 is inscribed on the painting commemorating the blessing of the church. There is also one altar.
