= List of monuments in Mellieħa =

This is a list of monuments in Mellieħa, Malta, which are listed on the National Inventory of the Cultural Property of the Maltese Islands.

== List ==
Name of object	Location	Coordinates	ID	Photo	Upload
Aħrax Tower and Battery	Triq ir-Ramla tat-Torri l-Abjad	35°59′44″N 14°21′52″E	00032	Aħrax Tower and Battery	Upload Photo
Red Tower	Triq tad-Daħar	35°58′29″N 14°20′35″E	00033	Red Tower	Upload Photo
Devil's Farmhouse	off Triq Tal-Prajjet	35°57′21″N 14°21′00″E	01201	Devil's Farmhouse	Upload Photo
Għajn Ħadid Tower	Ix-Xagħra ta' Selmun, Selmun	35°58′04″N 14°23′06″E	01378	Għajn Ħadid Tower	Upload Photo
Wied Musa Battery	Triq il-Marfa	35°59′13″N 14°20′31″E	01389	Wied Musa Battery	Upload Photo
Vendôme Battery - Armier	Triq Ramlet il-Qortin, L-Armier	35°59′22″N 14°21′13″E	01390	Vendôme Battery - Armier	Upload Photo
Crevelli Redoubt - Armier	Triq L-Armier	35°59′21″N 14°21′29″E	01391	Crevelli Redoubt - Armier	Upload Photo
Qortin Redoubt	Ramlet il-Qortin	35°59′11″N 14°21′05″E	01392	Qortin Redoubt	Upload Photo
Tal-Bir Redoubt	Triq il-Ramla tal-Bir	35°59′09″N 14°20′47″E	01393	Tal-Bir Redoubt	Upload Photo
Louvier Entrenchment - Armier	L-Armier	35°59′30″N 14°21′45″E	01394	Louvier Entrenchment - Armier	Upload Photo
Ta' Kassisu Entrenchment - Mellieħa	L-Aħrax	35°58′43″N 14°21′31″E	01395		Upload Photo
Westreme Battery	Triq Dawret it-Tunnara	35°58′00″N 14°21′25″E	01396	Westreme Battery	Upload Photo
Mistra Battery	Mistra Bay	35°57′30″N 14°23′42″E	01397	Mistra Battery	Upload Photo
Għajn Tuffieħa Entrenchment	Golden Bay, Għajn Tuffieħa	35°56′05″N 14°20′42″E	01412		Upload Photo
