= Mellieħa Redoubt =

- Ridott tal-Mellieħa
- Mellieħa, Malta

Site information
- Type: Redoubt

Location
- Coordinates: 35°58′7.8″N 14°21′2.8″E

Site history
- Built: 1715–1716
- Built by: Order of Saint John
- Materials: Limestone
- Fate: Demolished

Mellieħa Redoubt (Maltese: Ridott tal-Mellieħa) was a redoubt in Mellieħa, Malta. It was built by the Order of Saint John in 1715–1716 as one of a series of coastal fortifications around the Maltese Islands. The limestone structure was demolished in the 19th century.

== History ==
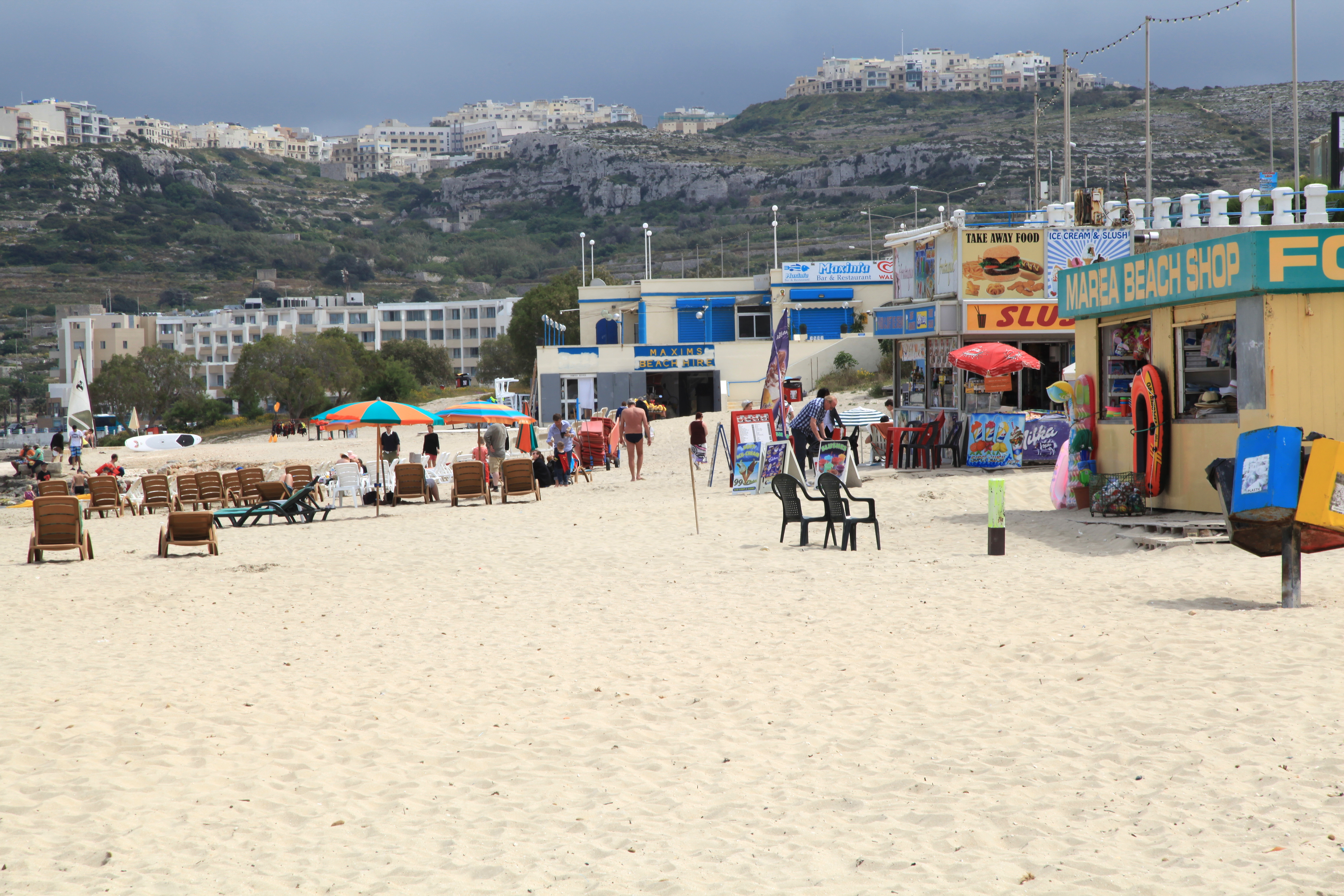
View of Għadira Bay, with the site of the redoubt in the centre

Mellieħa Redoubt was built in 1715–1716 as part of the first building programme of coastal fortifications in Malta. It was part of a chain of fortifications that defended Mellieħa Bay, which also included Fedeau and Westreme Batteries and several entrenchments.

Construction of the Mellieħa Redoubt cost about 1,644 scudi. It consisted of a pentagonal platform with a low parapet, with rectangular blockhouse located at the centre of its gorge. It was one of the few redoubts which were armed with artillery, and had four 6-pounder guns in 1770. The gunpowder was stored in the nearby Saint Agatha's Tower.

The redoubt was demolished in the early 19th century to make way for the road leading from Mellieħa to Ċirkewwa. Its stones were used to build the road.

== See also ==
- Crivelli Redoubt
- Qortin Redoubt
- Tal-Bir Redoubt
