= Vendôme Battery =

Artillery battery in Malta

- Batterija ta' Vendôme
- Mellieħa, Malta

Site information
- Type: Artillery battery
- Owner: Government of Malta
- Controlled by: Private tenant
- Open to the public: No
- Condition: Derelict

Location
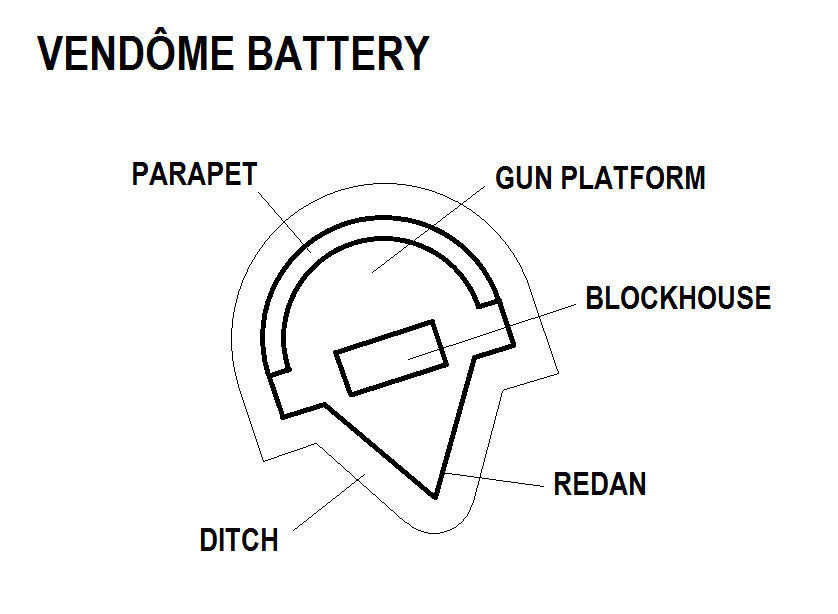
- Map of the Vendôme Battery
- Coordinates: 35°59′22.3″N 14°21′12.6″E

Site history
- Built: 1715–1716
- Built by: Order of Saint John
- Materials: Limestone

Vendôme Battery (Maltese: Batterija ta' Vendôme), also known as Ta' Maċċu Battery (Maltese: Batterija ta' Maċċu), is an artillery battery near Armier Bay, limits of Mellieħa, Malta. It was built by the Order of Saint John in 1715–1716 as one of a series of coastal fortifications around the Maltese Islands.

== History ==
Vendôme Battery was built in 1715–1716 as part of the first building programme of coastal batteries in Malta. It was part of a chain of fortifications that defended the northern coast of Malta, which also included Aħrax Tower, several batteries, redoubts and entrenchments. The nearest fortifications to Vendôme Battery are Qortin Redoubt to the west and Crivelli Redoubt to the east.

The battery was named after Philippe de Vendôme, the Prior of France, who donated 40,000 scudi to construct batteries and redoubts around Malta's coastline. Several other fortifications were named after Vendôme, including a tour-reduit in Marsaxlokk and a number of redoubts.

Vendôme Battery was one of the largest batteries to be built in Malta. It has a semi-circular gun platform, having a parapet with nine embrasures. A blockhouse is located at the centre of the battery, and its land front contains a large redan. The entire structure is surrounded by a ditch and glacis.

The battery was armed with five 8-pounder and four 12-pounder iron guns in 1785. Later on, mortars were also installed in the battery.

== Present day ==
Today, Vendôme Battery is still mostly intact, but is in a state of neglect. Its ditch has been filled with soil and used to grow vegetables, while its walls are in a dilapidated state. Some stonework has been illegally removed and used in the construction of the nearby illegally built boathouses, which have also damaged the battery's relationship with the sea.
