= Mellieħa Ridge =

Ridge in Malta

Coordinates: 35°57′4″N 14°22′1″E

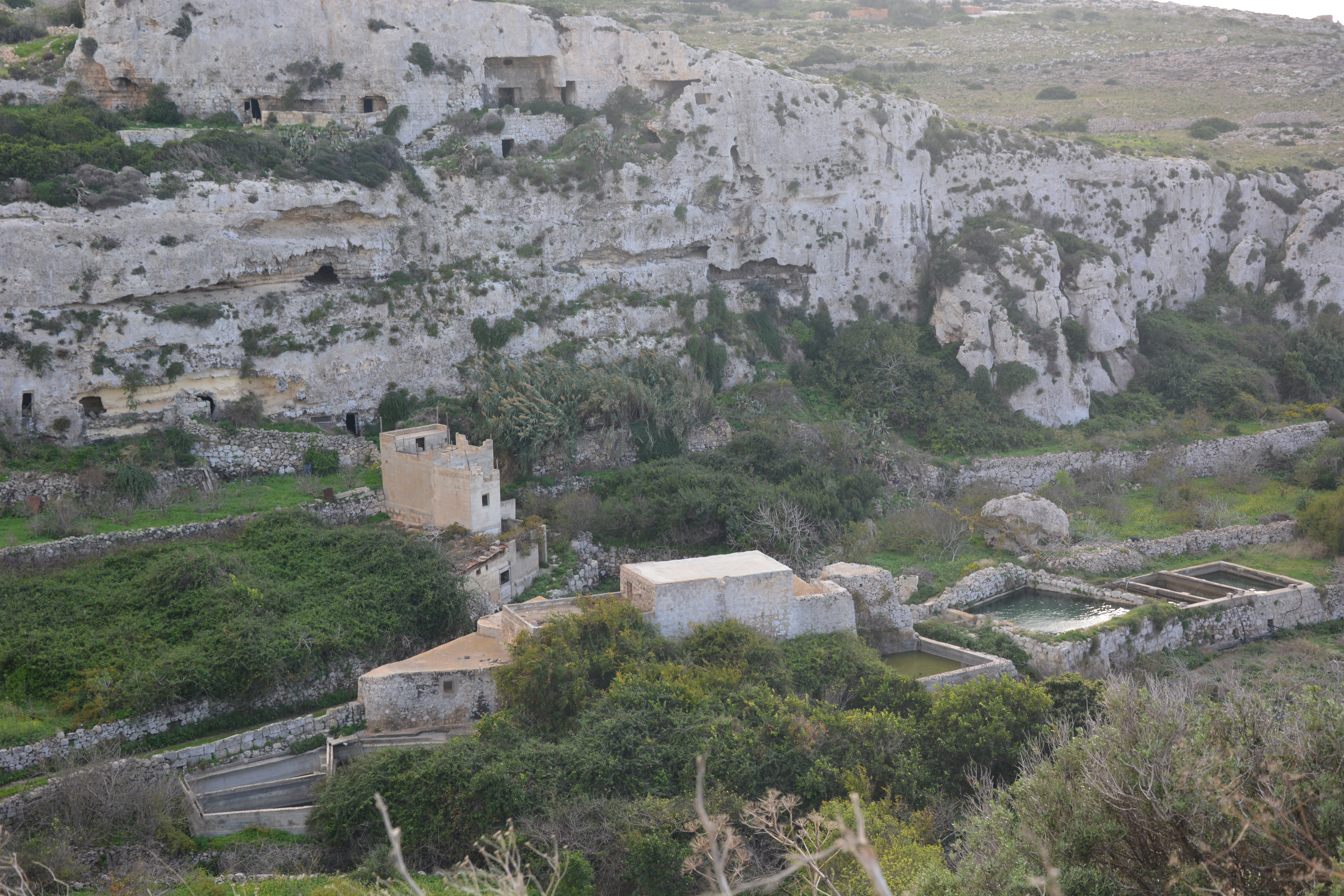
Several caves are located below the ridge.

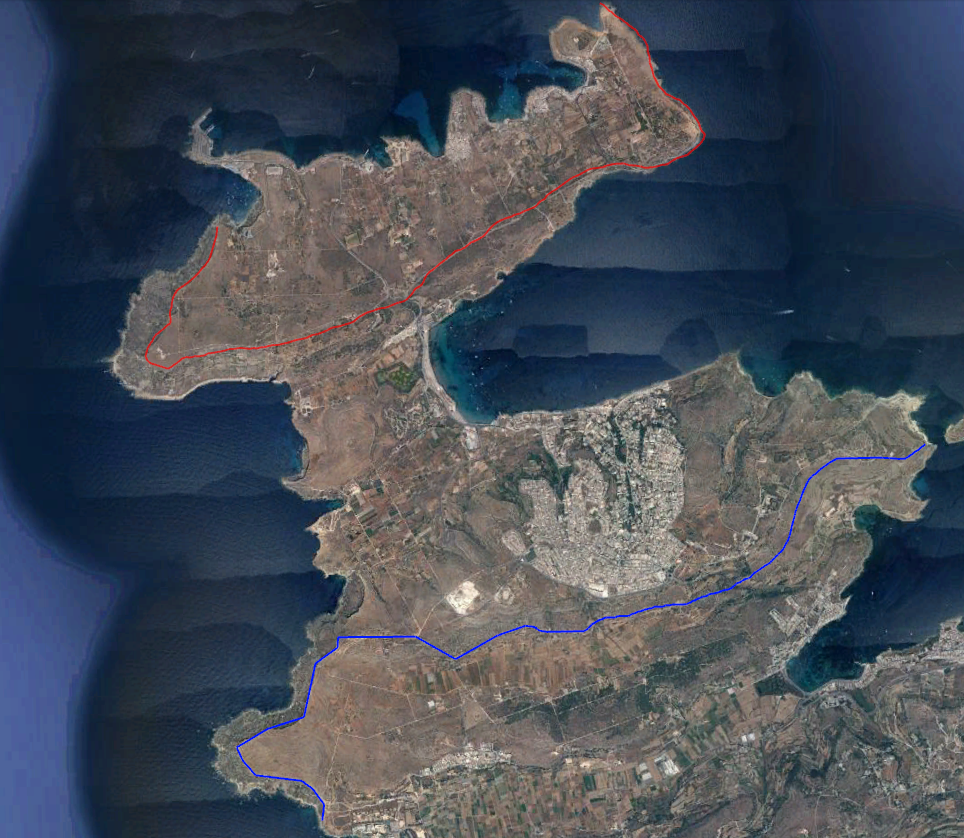
The blue line represents the Mellieha ridge. The red line represents Marfa ridge.

The Mellieħa Ridge is a geographical ridge in northwestern Malta. It is 2.85 kilometres (1.77 mi) south of Marfa Ridge. The ridge itself is 8.41 kilometres (5.23 mi) long and is made out of globigerina limestone. A small part of the Victoria lines also go through the higher part of the ridge.
