= Fedeau Battery =

Artillery battery of Malta

- Batterija ta' Fedeau
- Mellieħa, Malta

Site information
- Type: Artillery battery

Location
- Coordinates: 35°58′30.4″N 14°21′7.4″E

Site history
- Built: 1714–1716
- Built by: Order of Saint John
- Materials: Limestone
- Fate: Demolished

Fedeau Battery (Maltese: Batterija ta' Fedeau) was an artillery battery in Mellieħa, Malta. It was built by the Order of Saint John in 1714–16 as part of a series of coastal fortifications around the Maltese Islands, and demolished in the 20th century.

Fedeau Battery was also known as Vendôme Battery (Maltese: Batterija ta' Vendôme), Ta' Kassisu Battery (Maltese: Batterija ta' Qassisu) or Mellieħa Left Battery.

== History ==
Fedeau Battery was built from 1714 to 1716 as part of the Order of Saint John's first building program of coastal fortifications. It was part of a chain of fortifications that defended Mellieħa Bay, which also included Westreme Battery, Mellieħa Redoubt and several entrenchments.

The knight Mongontier contributed 423 scudi for the construction of the battery, while the remaining 899.4.17 scudi were paid by the Order. The battery's layout was similar to Ferretti Battery's, consisting of a semi-circular gun platform with a parapet having three embrasures. The gorge had two blockhouses with a redan in the centre.

In 1748, Grand Master Pinto converted the battery into a tuna processing plant. Despite this, it did not lose its military function as it was armed with four 8-pounder guns in 1770.

The battery was in part demolished in the 20th century. Its site is now occupied by the Mellieħa Bay Hotel. The remains of the battery still exist and are currently being studied for preservation. The present hotel will be demolished and a new hotel will be built. The remains will be incorporated into the project.
