= Marfa Ridge =

Geographical ridge in Malta

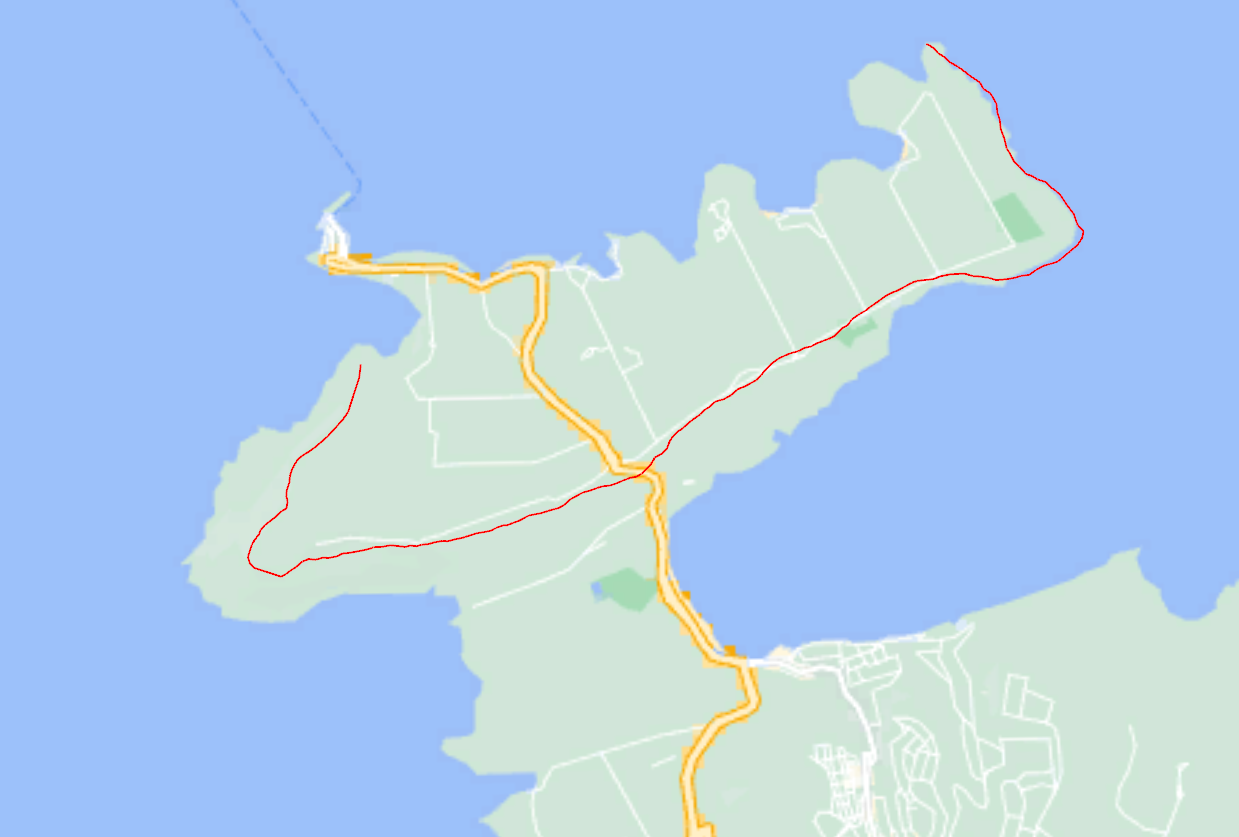
Marfa ridge on a map (red)

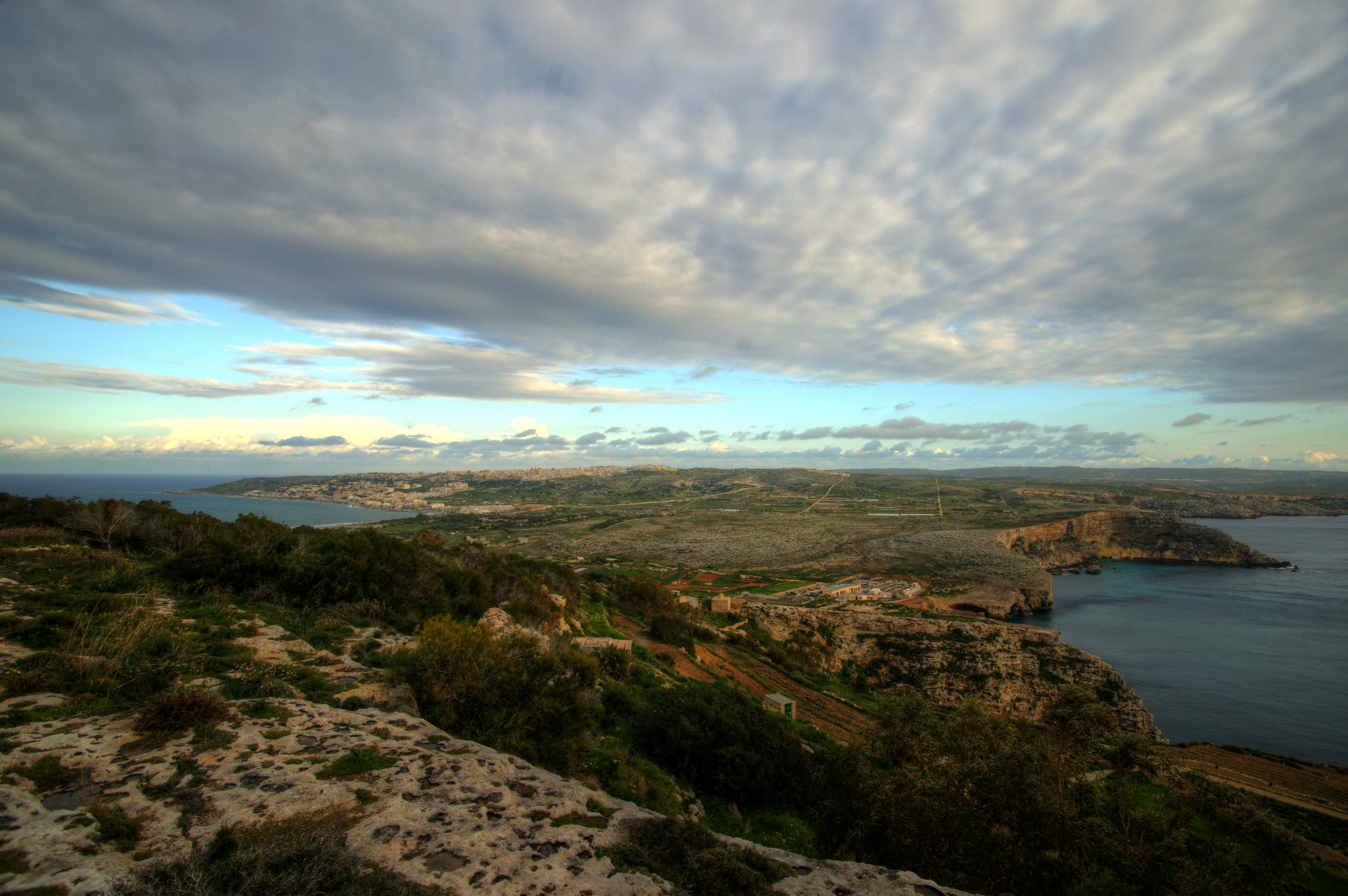
Marfa ridge from Mellieha

The Marfa Ridge is a geographical ridge in northwest Malta. It extends for approximately 5.16 miles (8.30 km) and reaches a maximum elevation of 411 feet (125 m) at its western end. The ridge is composed entirely of Globigerina limestone, a soft sedimentary rock that forms much of the Maltese islands' geology. Its eastern slopes are characterised by terraced farmland, while the western end features exposed karstic garigue and coastal cliffs.

== Geography ==
The ridge runs east–west along the northwestern coast of Malta, overlooking the Gozo Channel to the north. The Għadira Nature Reserve, Malta's largest nature reserve, and Mellieħa Bay, the island's largest sandy bay, lie approximately 1 kilometre (0.62 mi) to the south. The northern cliff side drops sharply towards several coastal inlets, including Paradise Bay, Armier Bay, and the Coral Lagoon, a natural sinkhole formed by coastal erosion. Hiking trails follow the length of the ridge, passing through garigue habitats and alongside dry-stone walls that demarcate ancient field boundaries.

== Landmarks ==
The ridge contains several historical and modern structures. Saint Agatha's Tower, commonly known as the Red Tower, is a 17th-century fortified watchtower built by the Knights of St John in 1649. It stands at the eastern edge of the ridge and originally served as a signalling post within a chain of coastal defences. The abandoned Festaval Hotel, an unfinished aparthotel complex dating from the late 20th century, is also located on the ridge. The ridge also accommodates the Qammieh Radio Installation, a modern telecommunications facility. In addition, the area contains remnants of military entrenchments from the Knights' period and defensive structures dating to World War II, including observation posts and gun emplacements.
