= Wied Musa Battery =

- Batterija ta' Wied Musa
- Mellieħa, Malta
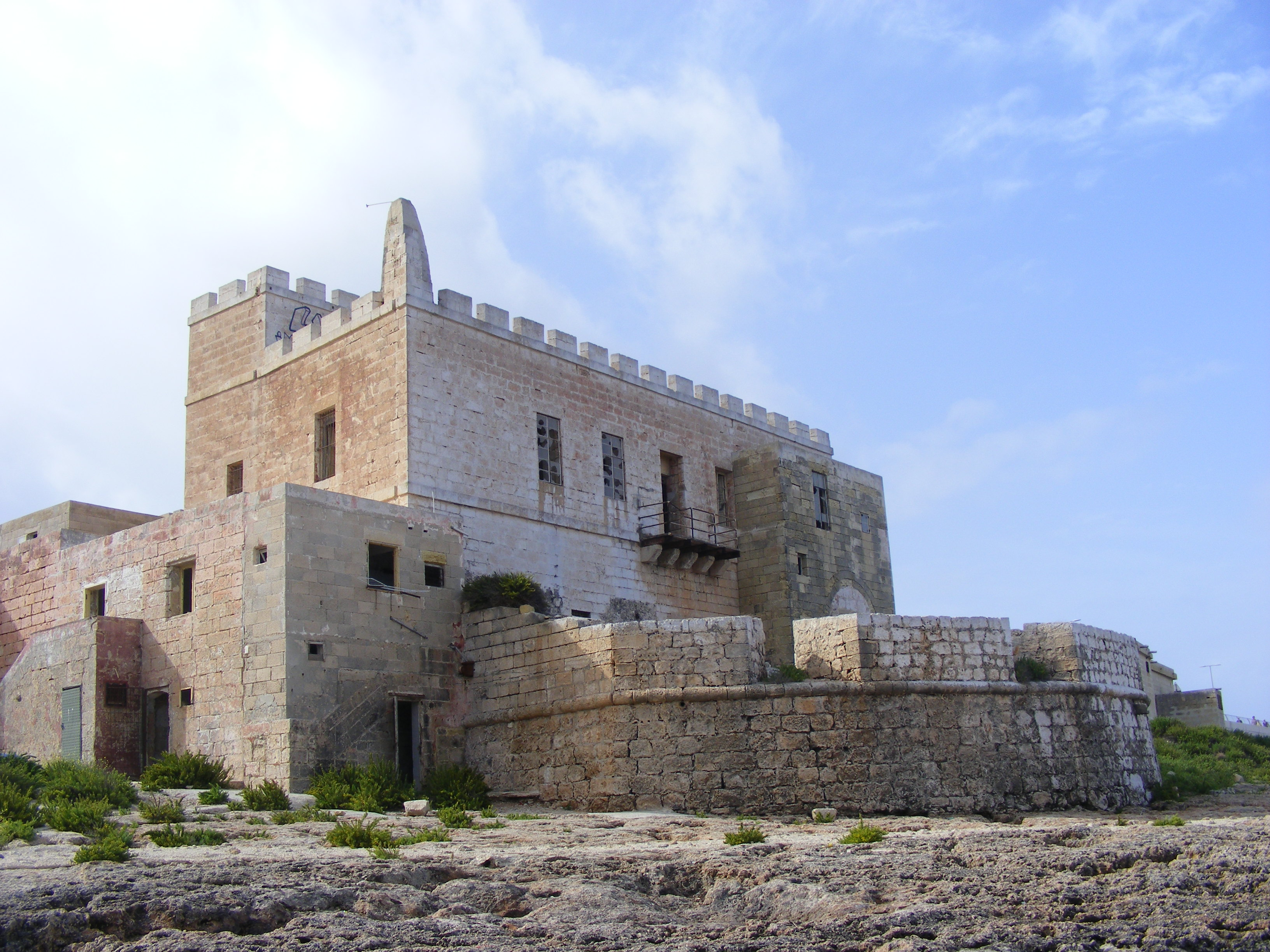
- Wied Musa Battery as viewed from the sea

Site information
- Type: Artillery battery
- Owner: Government of Malta
- Open to the public: No
- Condition: Gun platform intact Blockhouse largely destroyed

Location
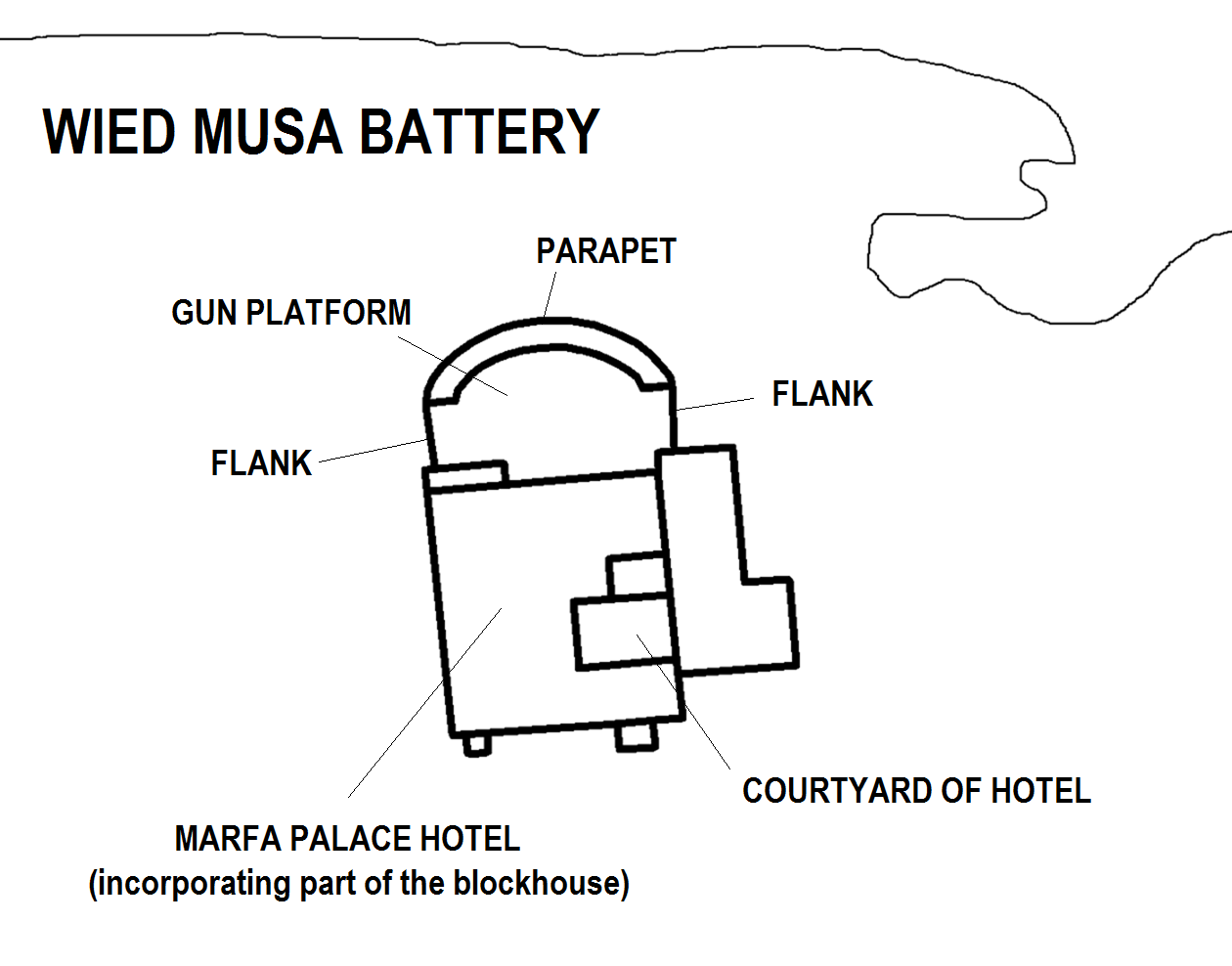
- Map of Wied Musa Battery as it is today
- Coordinates: 35°59′12.7″N 14°20′31.4″E

Site history
- Built: 1714–1716
- Built by: Order of Saint John
- Materials: Limestone

Wied Musa Battery (Maltese: Batterija ta' Wied Musa), also known as Swatar Battery (Maltese: Batterija tas-Swatar), is a former artillery battery in Marfa, limits of Mellieħa, Malta. It was built by the Order of Saint John in 1714–1716 as one of a series of coastal fortifications around the Maltese Islands.

In the 19th century, the battery was converted into the Marfa Palace Hotel, and it is also known as Palazz l-Aħmar (Red Palace). The structure was extensively modified in the process, and its blockhouse was incorporated into new buildings. Despite this, the parapet is still intact and is among the best preserved gun platforms in Malta.

== History ==
Wied Musa Battery was built in 1714–1716 as part of the first building programme of coastal fortifications in Malta. It was part of a chain of fortifications that defended the northern coast of Malta, which also included Aħrax Tower, several batteries, redoubts and entrenchments. The nearest fortification to Wied Musa Battery is Tal-Bir Redoubt to the east. Wied Musa Battery also commanded the South Comino Channel in conjunction with Saint Mary's Battery on the island of Comino.

The battery originally consisted of a semi-circular gun platform with a parapet having four embrasures. It had a rectangular blockhouse closing its gorge, which was also protected by a redan.

Construction of the battery cost 938 scudi, one third of which were donated by Commander Mongontier. In 1785, its armament consisted of four 8-pounder guns. Its ammunition was stored in the nearby Saint Agatha's Tower.

In the 19th century, a hotel was built on the rear of the battery. The blockhouse was incorporated into the new structure, and the redan was demolished. The hotel and battery were later used as a retreat house and as a police station. The structure fell into disuse in the 1990s, and it was illegally occupied by squatters. They were evicted after a fire broke out in 2005, and the hotel and battery have remained abandoned ever since.

== Present day ==
Since the blockhouse was incorporated into a hotel, only its left room has survived more or less intact. The blockhouse's musketry loopholes are still visible. The battery's gun platform still exists in a good state of preservation. Its original hardstone flagstones and places for stacking cannonballs have also survived.

The entire building is abandoned, and is in a rather dilapidated state although the structure is stable. Renovation would cost an estimated €1.2 million, and it could fetch up to €10 million if converted into a private residence.

In October 2013, the government issued a call for expressions of interest for the restoration and development of Marfa Palace and four other sites. Six expressions of interest were received, but only one bid was made when a request was made for formal proposals. The bid was made by Exclusivity Malta Ltd, who intend to transform it into a boutique hotel.
