= Qortin Redoubt =

- Ridott tal-Qortin
- Mellieħa, Malta

Site information
- Type: Redoubt
- Owner: Government of Malta
- Controlled by: Private tenant
- Open to the public: No
- Condition: Partially intact with modern alterations

Location
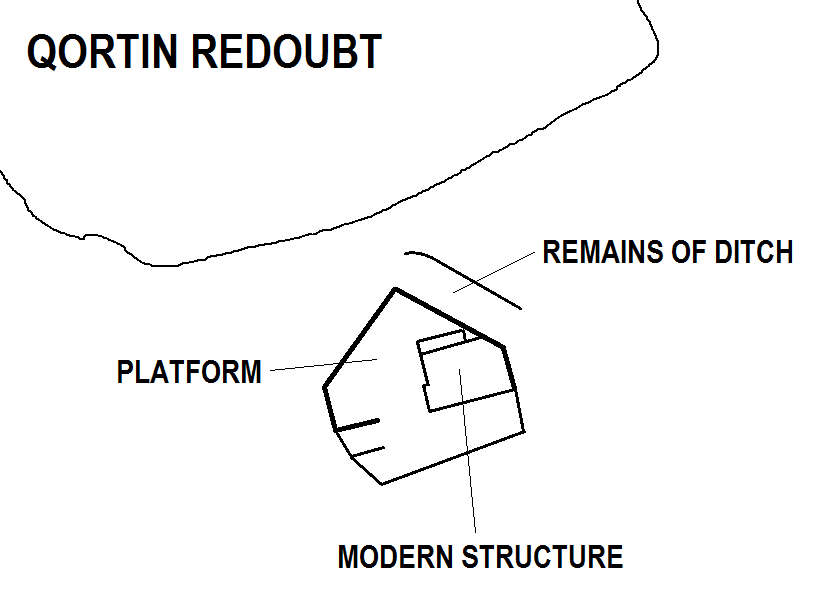
- Map of Qortin Redoubt with its modern alterations
- Coordinates: 35°59′11.3″N 14°21′5″E

Site history
- Built: 1715–1716
- Built by: Order of Saint John
- Materials: Limestone

Qortin Redoubt (Maltese: Ridott tal-Qortin), also known as Eskalar Redoubt (Maltese: Ridott t'Eskalar), is a redoubt in the limits of Mellieħa, Malta. It was built by the Order of Saint John in 1715–1716 as one of a series of coastal fortifications around the Maltese Islands. The redoubt still exists, but it has some modern modifications.

== History ==
Qortin Redoubt was built in 1715–1716 as part of the first building programme of coastal fortifications in Malta. It was part of a chain of fortifications that defended the northern coast of Malta, which also included Aħrax Tower, several batteries, redoubts and entrenchments. The nearest fortifications to Qortin Redoubt are Tal-Bir Redoubt to the west and Vendôme Battery to the east.

The redoubt originally consisted of a pentagonal platform with a low parapet. A rectangular blockhouse was located at the centre of its gorge. It was not armed with any artillery.

Construction of Qortin Redoubt cost around 1,239.8.19 scudi.

== Present day ==
Today, the pentagonal platform still exists, but the parapet has been removed. The blockhouse has been demolished and a summer residence built in its place.
