= Westreme Battery =

Former artillery battery in Mellieħa, Malta

- Batterija ta' Westreme
- Mellieħa, Malta
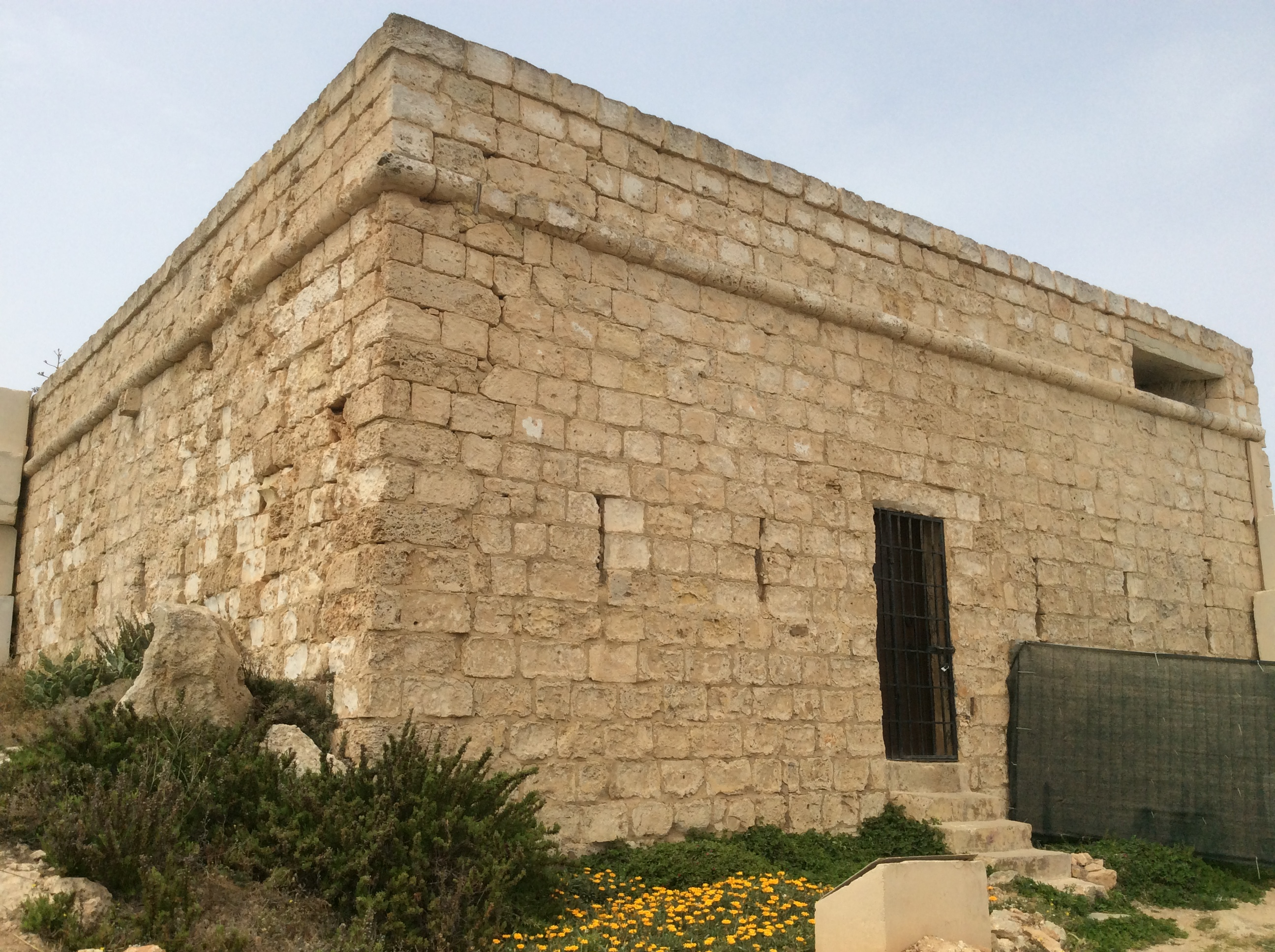
- The blockhouse of Westreme Battery, now the Tunnara Museum

Site information
- Type: Artillery battery
- Owner: Government of Malta
- Operator: Mellieħa Local Council
- Open to the public: Yes
- Condition: Blockhouse intact Parapet destroyed

Location
- Coordinates: 35°57′59.8″N 14°21′25.1″E

Site history
- Built: 1715–1716
- Built by: Order of Saint John
- Materials: Limestone
- Battles/wars: Capture of Malta (1798); World War II

Westreme Battery (Maltese: Batterija ta' Westreme), also known as ir-Rasus Battery (Maltese: Batterija tar-Rasus) or Mellieħa Right Battery (Maltese: Batterija tal-Lemin tal-Mellieħa), is a former artillery battery in Mellieħa, Malta. It was built by the Order of Saint John in 1715–1716 as one of a series of coastal fortifications around the Maltese Islands.

Most of the battery was destroyed over time, but the blockhouse still exists. It is now open to the public as the Tunnara Museum, a museum about tuna fishing.

== History ==
Westreme Battery was built in 1715 and 1716 as part of the Order of Saint John's first building program of coastal fortifications. The battery was probably named after a knight of the same name. No records with details about its construction are known. The battery was one of two batteries guarding Mellieħa Bay, the other one being the now-demolished Fedeau Battery. The area was further defended by Mellieħa Redoubt at the centre of the bay, but this no longer exists.

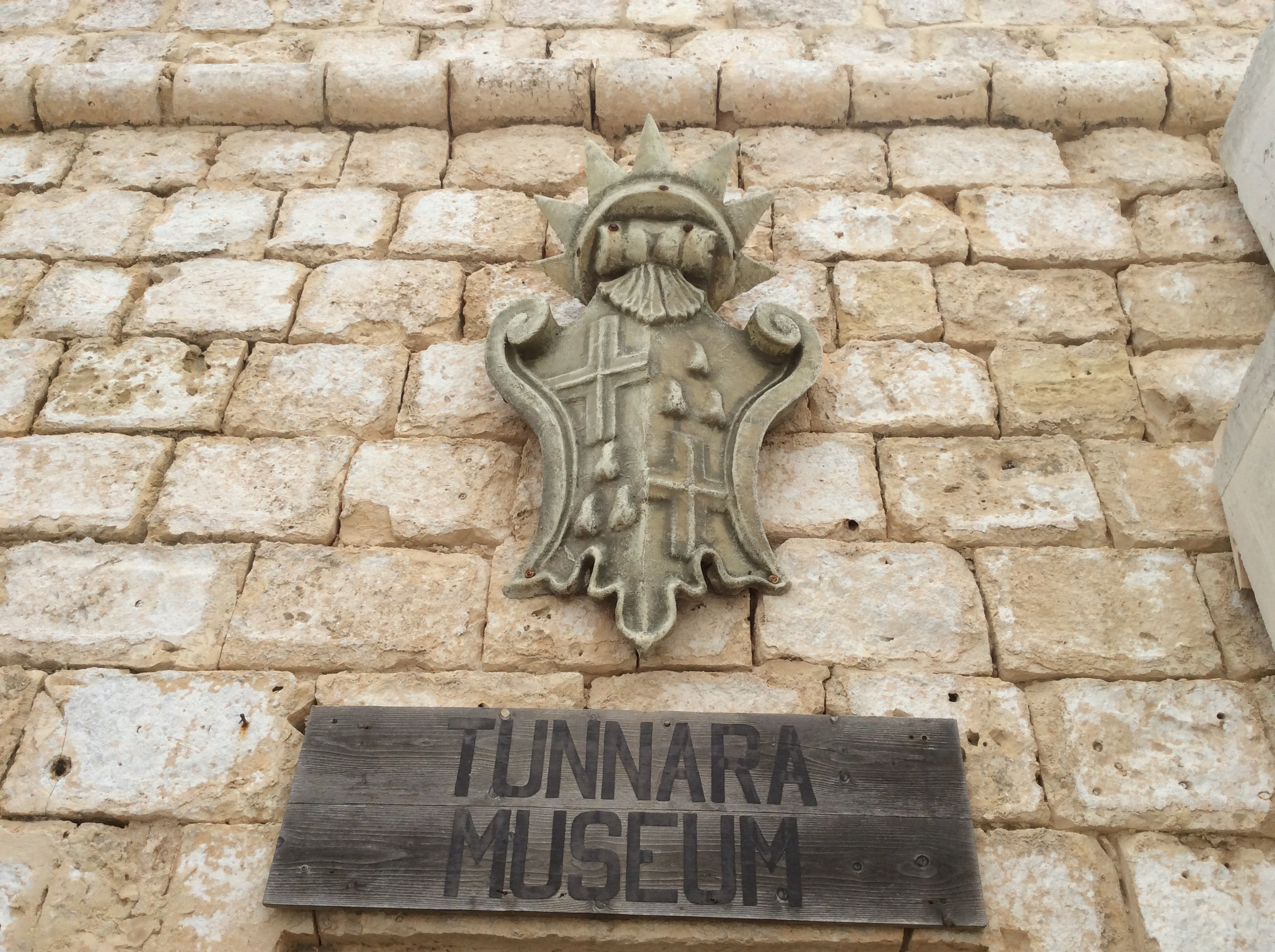
Coat of arms (modern) of Ramon Perellos on the battery

The battery consisted of a semi-circular gun platform, with its eastern face having a parapet with five embrasures. There was no parapet around the rest of the platform. This arrangement was similar to the one at the nearby Mistra Battery, but on a larger scale. The battery also had a single blockhouse, placed diagonally along the land front so that its two outer faces functioned as a redan, similar to Saint Mary's Battery. The blockhouse, which was pierced with musketry loopholes, was one of the largest blockhouses in any of the coastal batteries in Malta. These features put together made the battery unique, unlike any other in the Maltese islands.

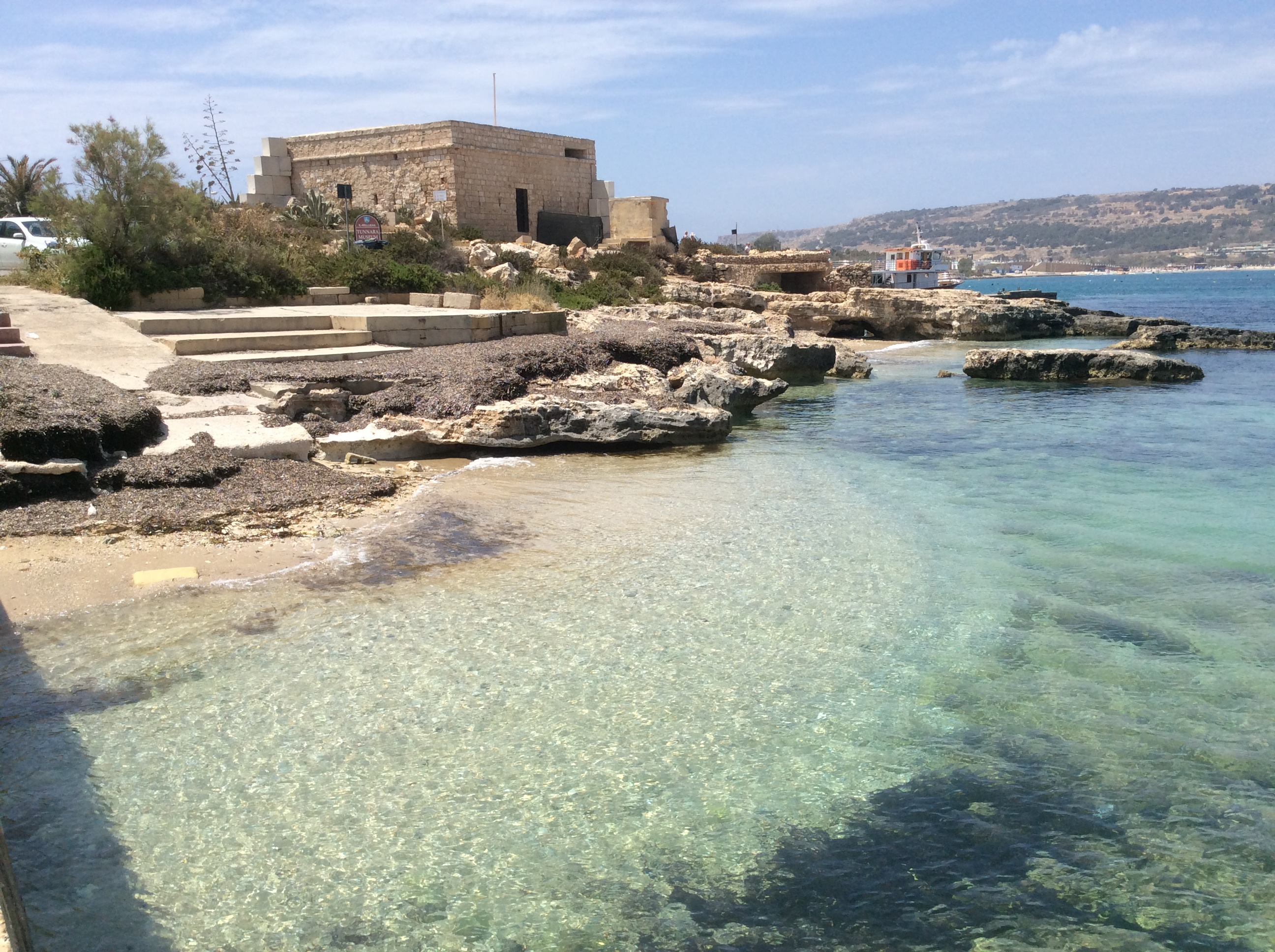
The battery with World War II additions

In 1748, Grand Master Pinto inaugurated the tunnara, a traditional Maltese tuna fishing method, at Westreme Battery. Over the years, the battery's military importance was diminished, and it was used as a store for fishing nets and other equipment used in the tunnara.

During the French invasion of Malta of 1798, Westreme Battery was the first battery to be overrun by the invading forces.

In World War II, the blockhouse was converted into a beach post. Rectangular machine gun portholes were cut into the corners of the building. Another concrete beach post and a searchlight emplacement were also built near the blockhouse. After the war, the blockhouse was again used in the tunnara.

== Present day ==
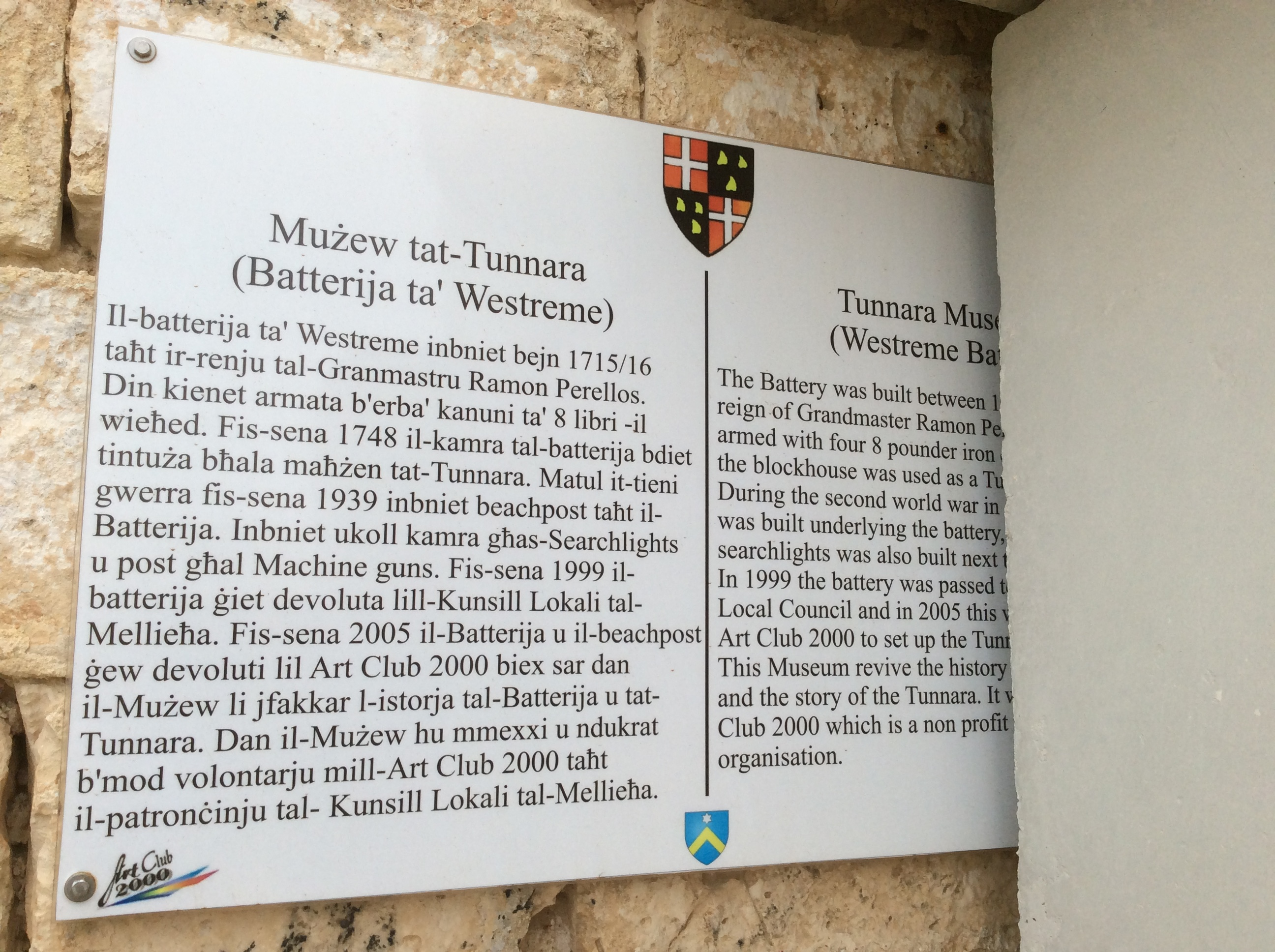
Information post at the entrance

Today, the semi-circular gun platform and the parapet of the battery no longer exist, although some parts of the rock hewn base can still be seen. The blockhouse is still intact, and is open to the public as the Tunnara Museum. Its exhibits relate mainly to Maltese traditional tuna fishing.

The blockhouse was restored in 2007 and 2008. Further restoration works began in 2015. A full renovation project was announced in October 2019, which will take place with a majority of EU funds allocation.
