= Tal-Bir Redoubt =

- Ridott tal-Bir
- Mellieħa, Malta
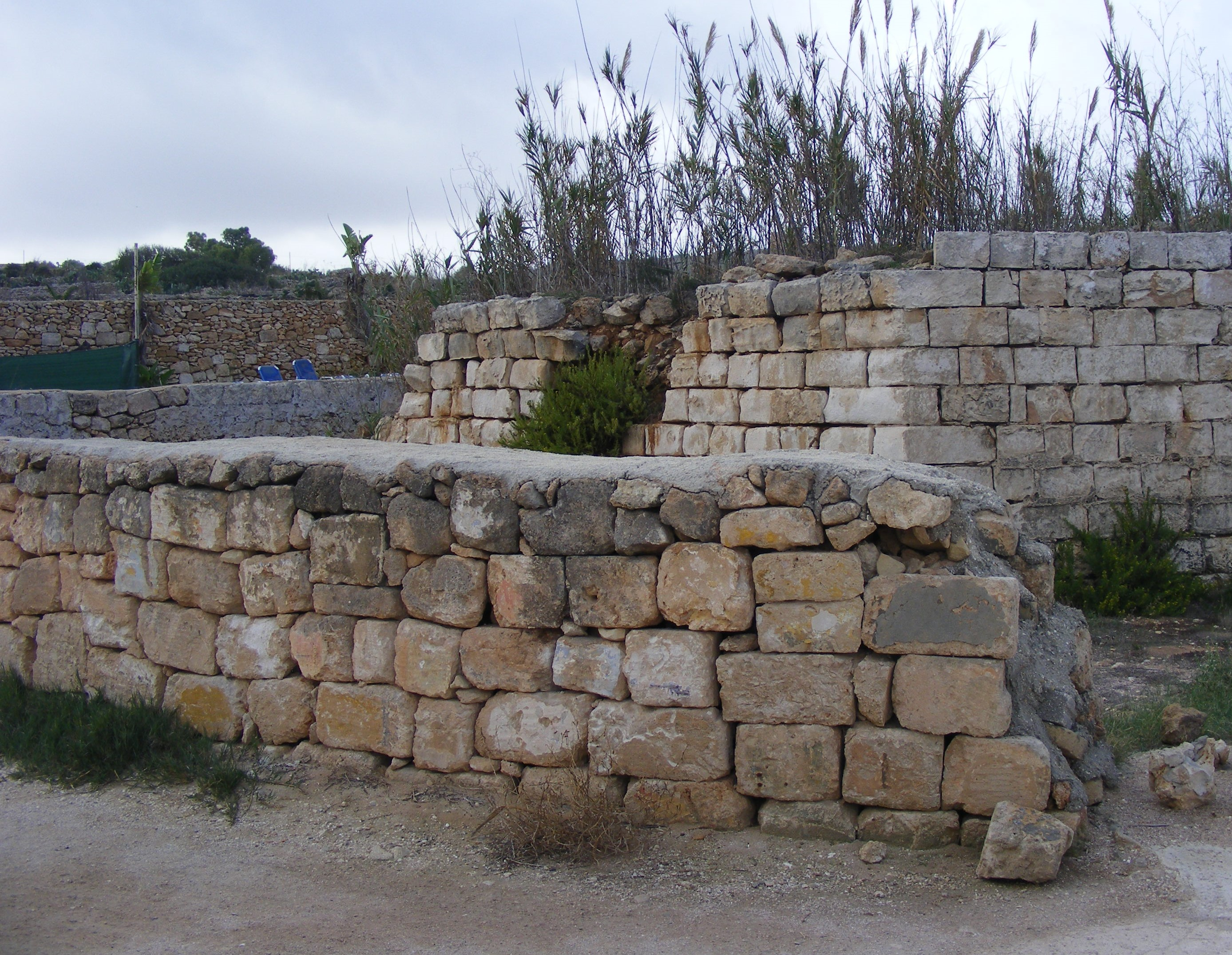
- Ruins of Tal-Bir Redoubt

Site information
- Type: Redoubt
- Owner: Government of Malta
- Condition: Ruins

Location
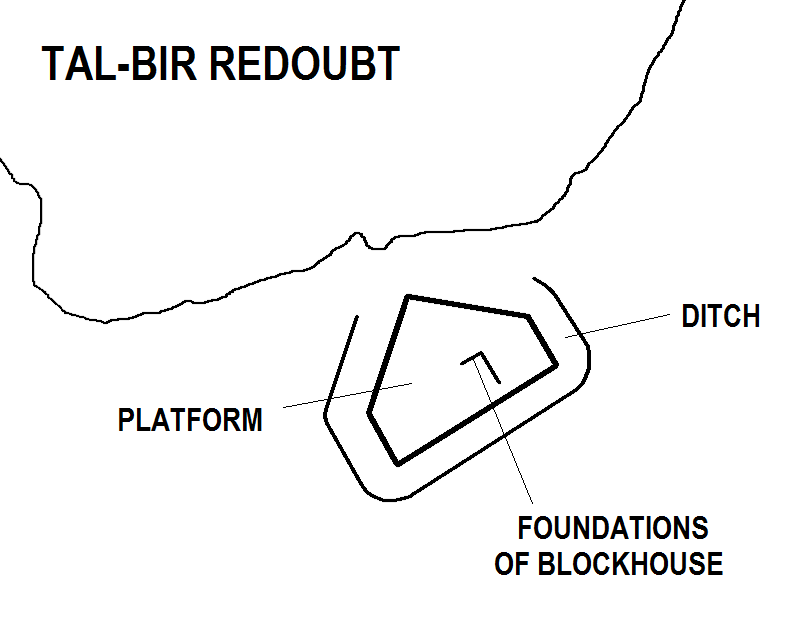
- Map of the remains of Tal-Bir Redoubt
- Coordinates: 35°59′8.9″N 14°20′47.4″E

Site history
- Built: 1715–1716
- Built by: Order of Saint John
- Materials: Limestone

Tal-Bir Redoubt (Maltese: Ridott tal-Bir), also known as Wied Musa Redoubt (Maltese: Ridott ta' Wied Musa), is a redoubt in the limits of Mellieħa, Malta. It was built by the Order of Saint John in 1715–1716 as one of a series of coastal fortifications around the Maltese Islands. Today, the redoubt lies in ruins.

== History ==
Tal-Bir Redoubt was built in 1715–1716 as part of the first building programme of coastal fortifications in Malta. It was part of a chain of fortifications that defended the northern coast of Malta, which also included Aħrax Tower, several batteries, redoubts and entrenchments. The nearest fortifications to Tal-Bir Redoubt are Wied Musa Battery to the west and Qortin Redoubt to the east.

The redoubt originally consisted of a pentagonal platform with a low parapet. A rectangular blockhouse was located at the centre of its gorge. It was not armed with any artillery.

Construction of Tal-Bir Redoubt cost around 1213.8.4.3 scudi.

== Present day ==
Today, the redoubt is almost completely destroyed. Only remains of the pentagonal platform and part of its counterscarp still exist.
