= Armier Bay =

Bay in Mellieħa, Malta

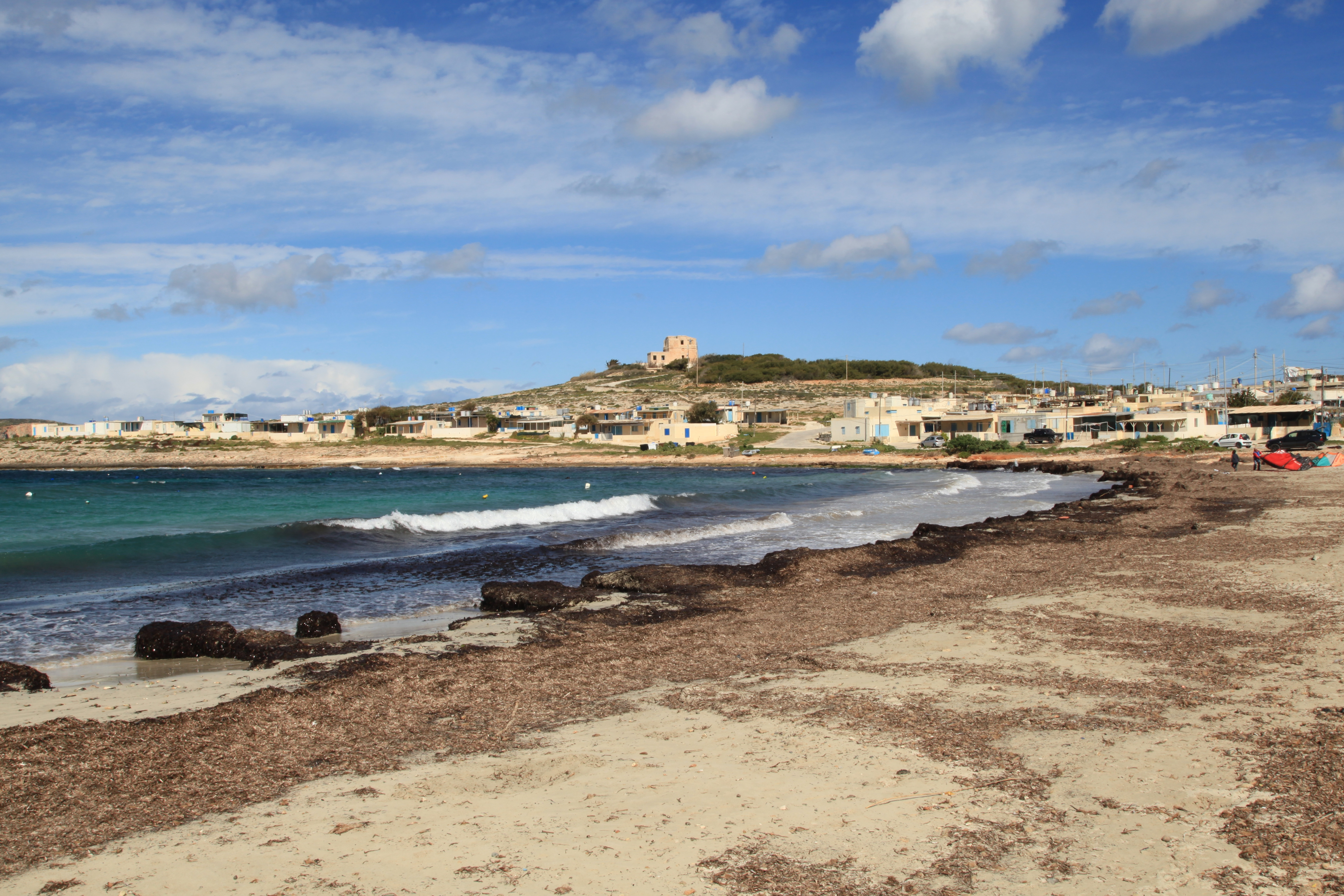
- Landscape of Armier Bay

- Location of the bay in Malta
- Location: Malta
- Group: Mediterranean Sea
- Coordinates: 35°59.5′N 14°21.5′E
- Type: Bay
- Surface elevation: 0 metres (0 ft)

Armier Bay (Maltese: Bajja tal-Armier), is a bay situated in the locality of Mellieħa, Malta. Armier Bay consists of two beaches, the biggest beach is known as Armier and the other one as Little Armier. The bay's water is known for its crystal blue colour.

At Armier Bay, one can find numerous boat houses, that are used as summer residences. The residents themselves claim that they take very good care of the environment, but there has been some contention on this issue. For instance, the local council has notified the owners of caravans to remove them as they are occupying public land. The Maltese Government has had a patchy history of enforcing its regulations against private encroachment on public land. A feast is also celebrated in summer in the area known as Ramlet il-Qortin. There are also kiosks, but the surrounding of the bay is silent, without the noise of traffic, because it is situated in the green area of Mellieħa known as L-Aħrax.

== See also ==
- Armier Tower
- Armier Redoubt
