= Crivelli Redoubt =

- Ridott ta' Crivelli
- Mellieħa, Malta

Site information
- Type: Redoubt
- Owner: Government of Malta
- Controlled by: Private tenant
- Open to the public: No
- Condition: Intact

Location
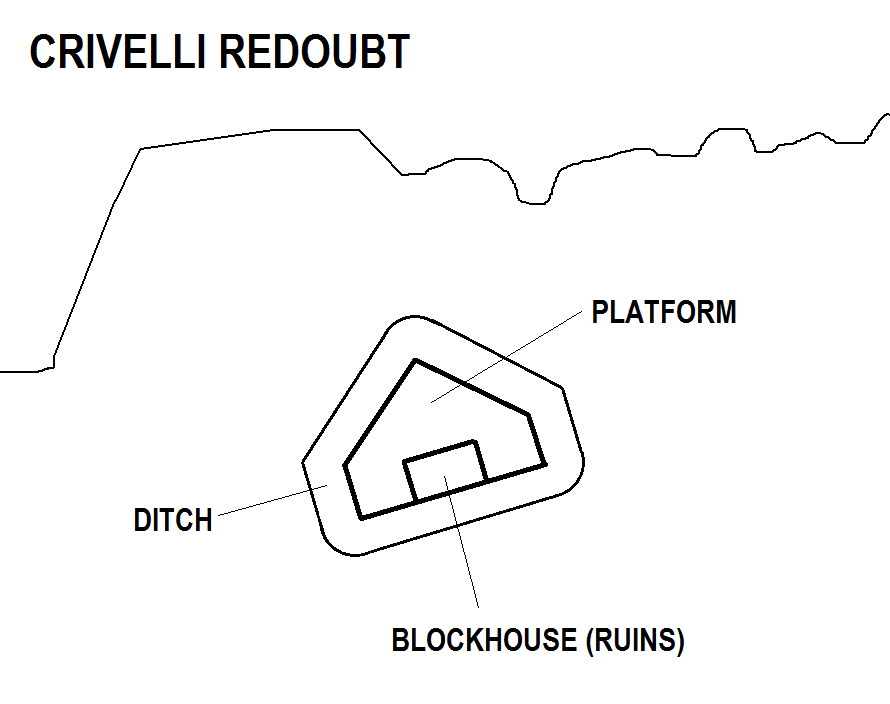
- Map of Crivelli Redoubt
- Coordinates: 35°59′20.7″N 14°21′29.1″E

Site history
- Built: 1715–1716
- Built by: Order of Saint John
- Materials: Limestone

Crivelli Redoubt (Maltese: Ridott ta' Crivelli), also known as Barriera Redoubt (Maltese: Ridott tal-Barriera) or Armier Redoubt (Maltese: Ridott tal-Armier), is a redoubt in Armier Bay, Mellieħa, Malta. It was built by the Order of Saint John in 1715–1716 as part of a series of coastal fortifications around the Maltese Islands. Today, the redoubt is in good condition.

In the early 19th century, Crivelli Redoubt was also known as La Canniere Redoubt.

== History ==
Crivelli Redoubt was built in 1715–1716 as part of the first building programme of coastal fortifications in Malta. It was part of a chain of fortifications that defended the northern coast of Malta, which also included Aħrax Tower, several batteries, redoubts and entrenchments. The nearest fortifications to Crivelli Redoubt are Vendôme Battery to the west and the Louvier Entrenchment to the east.

The redoubt was named after the Prior of Capua, Ferdinando Crivelli, who financed the money needed for its construction. It was probably designed by the French engineer Philip Maigret.

The redoubt consists of a pentagonal platform with a low parapet. A rectangular blockhouse with two rooms is located at the centre of its gorge, and the main entrance has an inscription making reference to the knight Crivelli. The redoubt is surrounded by a ditch, which is partially rock hewn. It was not armed with any artillery.

== Present day ==
By the early 21st century, the redoubt was in ruins, with the left wall and part of the roof of the blockhouse having been collapsed, with the façade being unstable. The damage has since been repaired.

Crivelli Redoubt is the best preserved redoubt in Mellieħa, since the others have been demolished or are in a worse state of preservation.
