= Qammieh Radio Installation =

Military radar station

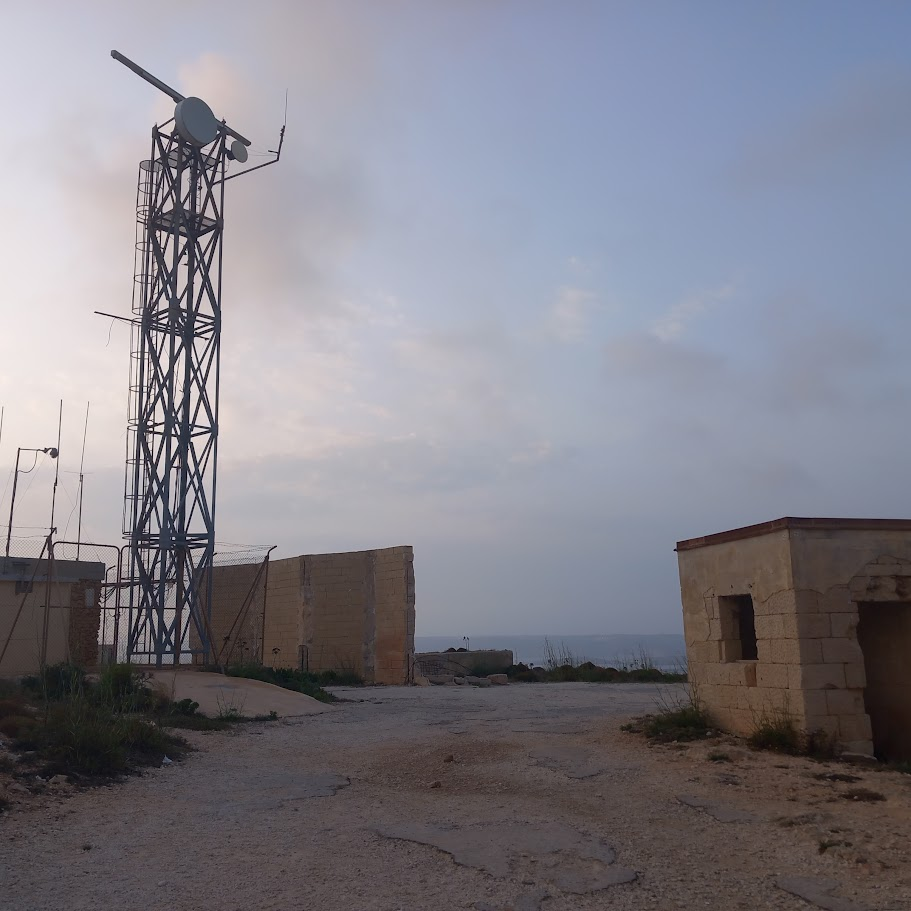
The central radio structure and surrounding rooms

The Qammieħ Radio Installation, is a former military radar station in Ras il-Qammieħ, Malta, was originally constructed for strategic defense purposes. This site is undergoing a transformative restoration to become a multidisciplinary hub for astronomy, wildlife surveillance, and public education.

== Early Military Use (1938-1970) ==
The Ras il-Qammieħ station was built in 1938 by British forces during the colonial period of Malta in Mellieħa, Malta. It served as a critical node in early-warning systems for Mediterranean naval operations. Its elevated coastal position provided unobstructed surveillance capabilities over maritime routes. Following World War II, the site was integrated into NATO's communication network under U.S. administration during the Cold War, where it functioned as a tropospheric scatter radar station for tracking satellites and long-range communications. Historical records indicate debates over its operational history, with some accounts suggesting the U.S. repurposed the site for satellite monitoring rather than traditional radar functions.

By 1970, advancements in satellite technology rendered the station obsolete, leading to its decommissioning. The infrastructure fell into disrepair over subsequent decades, suffering vandalism and environmental degradation. The site, along with the Saint Agatha's Tower, is part of the Natura 2000 protected area on the same road (Triq Tad-Dahar road) as Saint Agatha's Tower.

== Infrastructure ==
=== Contemporary Refurbishment ===
In 2025, Ambjent Malta, the national environmental agency, launched a €279,000 initiative to rehabilitate the derelict site. Approved by Malta's Planning Authority, the project focuses on:

- Demolishing structurally unsound sections of the original military complex. Reconstructing buildings to house an astronomy observatory and wildlife monitoring facilities.
- Installing outdoor equipment for stargazing and ecological research, including telescopic mounts and camera traps.
- Creating picnic areas, walking trails, and interpretive signage to enhance public access.

The restoration respects the site's historical fabric while adapting it for educational and recreational purposes. For example, remnants of radar foundations are being repurposed as viewing platforms for the night sky.

== Ecology ==
The Ras il-Qammieħ area forms part of the Rdumijiet ta’Malta Natura 2000 site, a Special Area of Conservation (SAC) under the EU Habitats Directive. The cliffs and rockpools here support unique ecosystems, including endemic flora like Lygeum spartum and migratory bird species. Ambjent Malta's project incorporates habitat restoration measures, such as replanting native vegetation and controlling invasive species.

Hydrological studies conducted for the adjacent Natura 2000 management plan have informed drainage and erosion-control strategies at the radar site, ensuring minimal disruption to seasonal watercourses.
