= Saint Agatha's Tower =

Tower in Mellieha, Malta

- Torri ta' Sant'Agata
- Part of the Lascaris towers
- Mellieħa, Malta
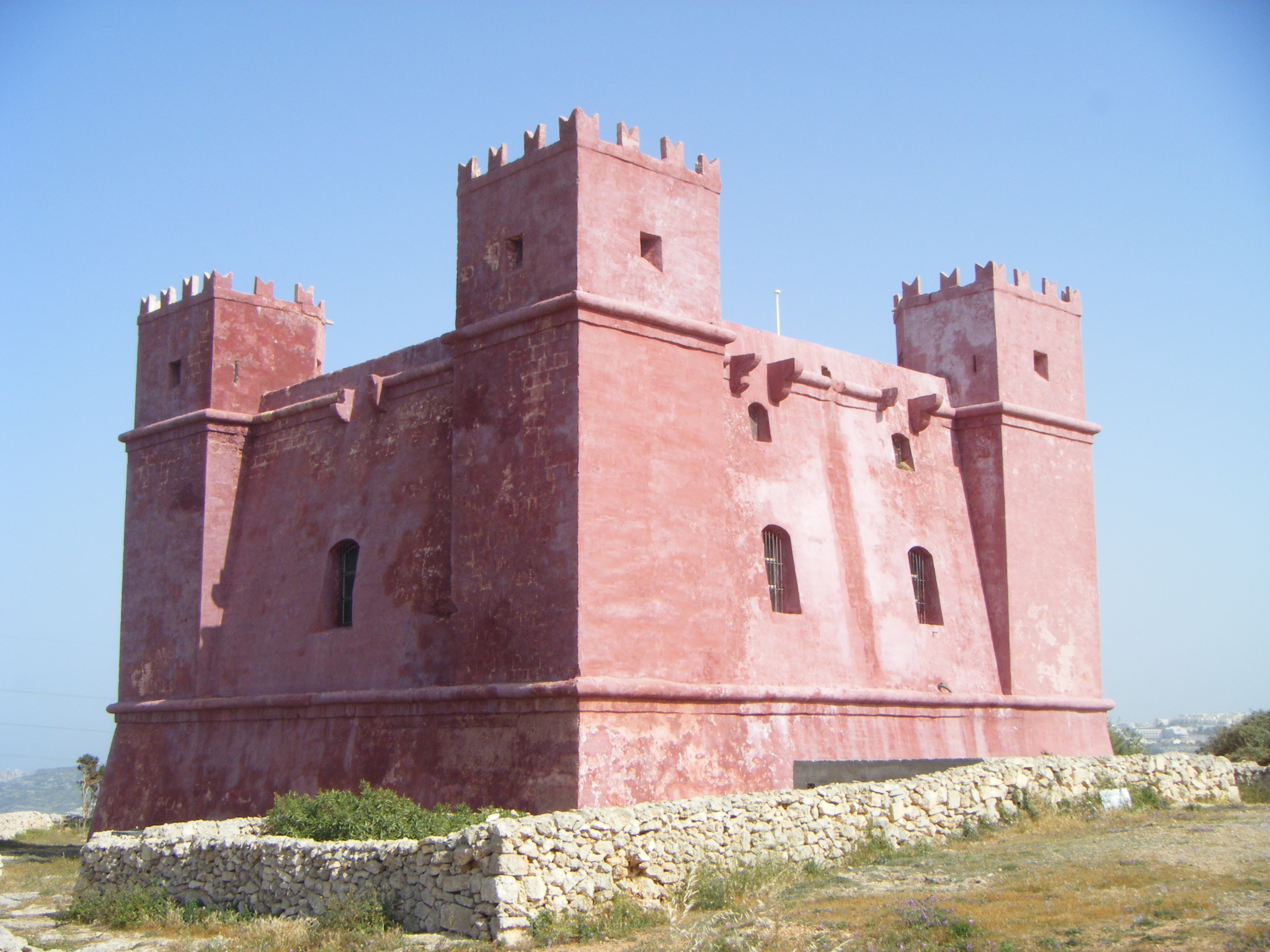
- Northwest corner of St. Agatha's Tower

Site information
- Type: Bastioned watchtower
- Owner: Government of Malta
- Controlled by: Din l-Art Ħelwa
- Open to the public: Yes
- Condition: Intact

Location
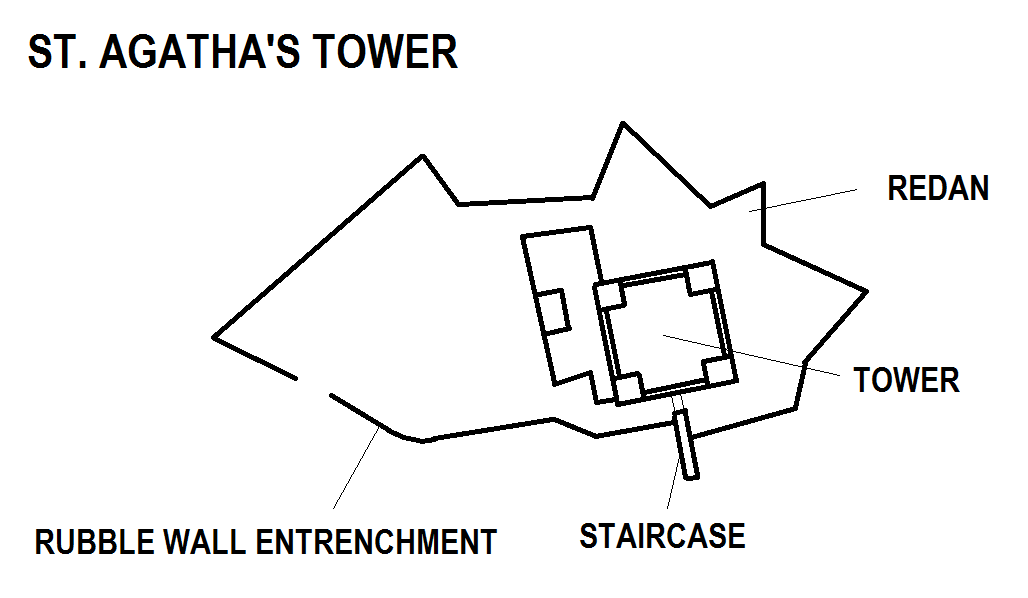
- Map of St. Agatha's Tower and the surrounding entrenchment
- Coordinates: 35°58′28.8″N 14°20′34.7″E

Site history
- Built: 1647–1649
- Built by: Order of Saint John
- In use: 1649–20th century
- Materials: Limestone

Saint Agatha's Tower (Maltese: Torri ta' Sant'Agata), also known as the Red Tower (Maltese: Torri l-Aħmar), Mellieħa Tower (Maltese: Torri tal-Mellieħa) or Fort Saint Agatha (Maltese: Forti Sant'Agata), is a large bastioned watchtower in Mellieħa, Malta. It was built between 1647 and 1649, as the sixth of the Lascaris towers. The tower's design is completely different from the rest of the Lascaris towers, but it is similar to the earlier Wignacourt towers. St. Agatha's Tower was the last large-bastioned tower to be built in Malta.

== History and architecture ==
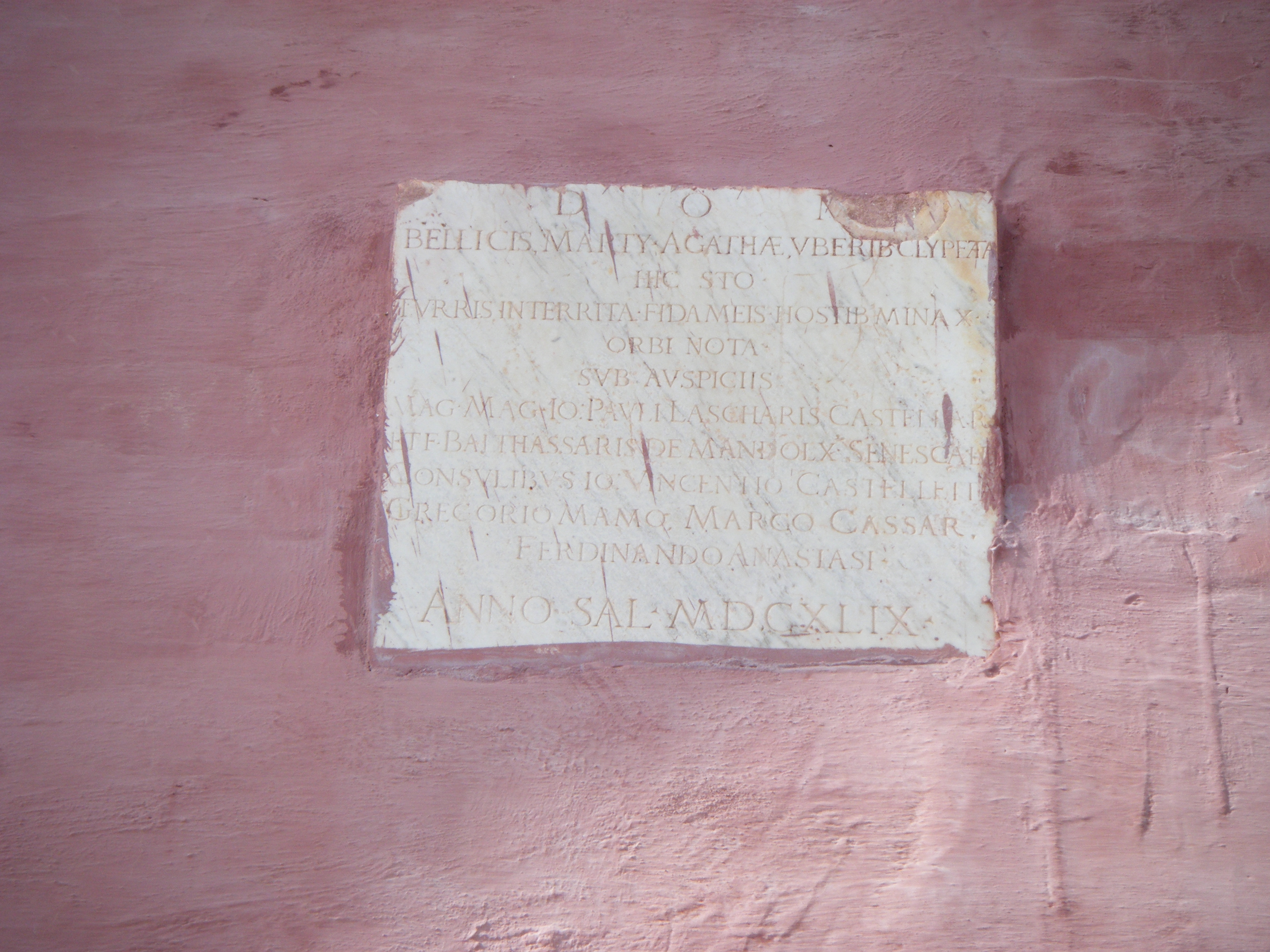
Inscription on the tower dated 1649

Saint Agatha's Tower (original language as Torre Sant’ Agata, also named Torre Rossa and Torre Caura) was built between November 1647 and April 1649 to a design by the architect Antonio Garsin. The structure consists of a square tower with four corner towers. Cannon ports in the turrets gave interlocking fields of fire commanding the base of the walls and the gateway, with other large cannon ports in the faces of the main tower. The outer walls are approximately four metres thick at the base and the interior of the tower is enclosed by a barrel vaulted roof. The corner turrets are surmounted by very characteristic fish tail crenelations. A chapel was located within the tower.

The tower is situated in a commanding position on the crest of Marfa Ridge at the north-west end of Malta, overlooking the natural harbour and the potential enemy landing site of Mellieħa Bay, with clear views over to Comino and Gozo, and also eastward to the line of watchtowers along the north shore of Malta that linked it with the Knights headquarters in Valletta. It was the Knights' primary stronghold in the west of Malta, and was manned by a garrison of 30 men, with ammunition and supplies to withstand a siege of 40 days. The ammunition of other fortifications in the north of Malta, such as Aħrax Tower and Wied Musa Battery, was also stored in the tower.

Like many of the Knights' early defensive structures, St. Agatha's Tower was strengthened during the early 18th century. A low profile rubble wall entrenchment was built around the flanks of the tower in the form of a redan trace. Due to this, the tower also functioned as a redoubt, similar to the one at Żabbar during the French blockade. The site, along with the Qammieh Radio Installation, is on the same Triq Tad-Dahar road.

It continued to have a military function throughout the British period, and was manned during both World Wars. From the British period it continued its military function, being used as a radar station by the Armed Forces of Malta.

== Present day ==
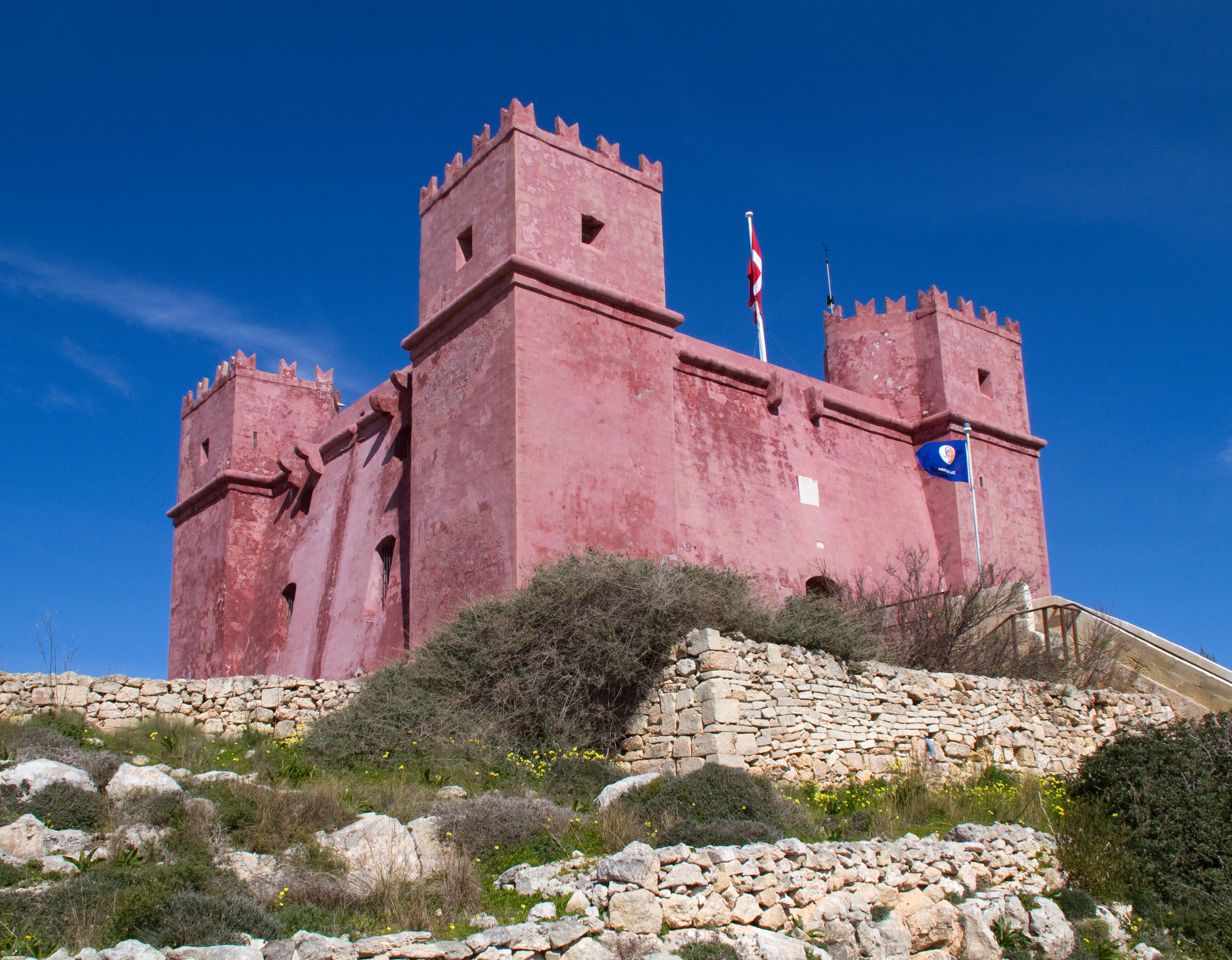
Southwest corner of the tower, with the rubble wall entrenchment in the foreground

By the close of the 20th century, St. Agatha's Tower was in poor repair, with one turret completely missing and another severely damaged. The tower was gradually restored by Din l-Art Ħelwa, starting in 1999 and completed in 2001, assisted by substantial industrial sponsorship. As part of the restoration work, the damaged turrets were replaced, the walls and roof were rebuilt, eroded stone facing was replaced, interior walls were scraped and painted, the original floor was uncovered, and the interior staircase to the roof was rebuilt. Due to the extreme unevenness of the floor, this was recently covered by a wooden surface with glass apertures through which one can view the original slabs. The tower is still in the care of Din l-Art Ħelwa and is open to the public.

In 2015, the tower was awarded a Certificate of Excellence by TripAdvisor.
