= Aħrax Tower =

Aħrax Tower & Battery
- Torri u Batterija tal-Aħrax
- Part of the De Redin towers
- Mellieħa, Malta
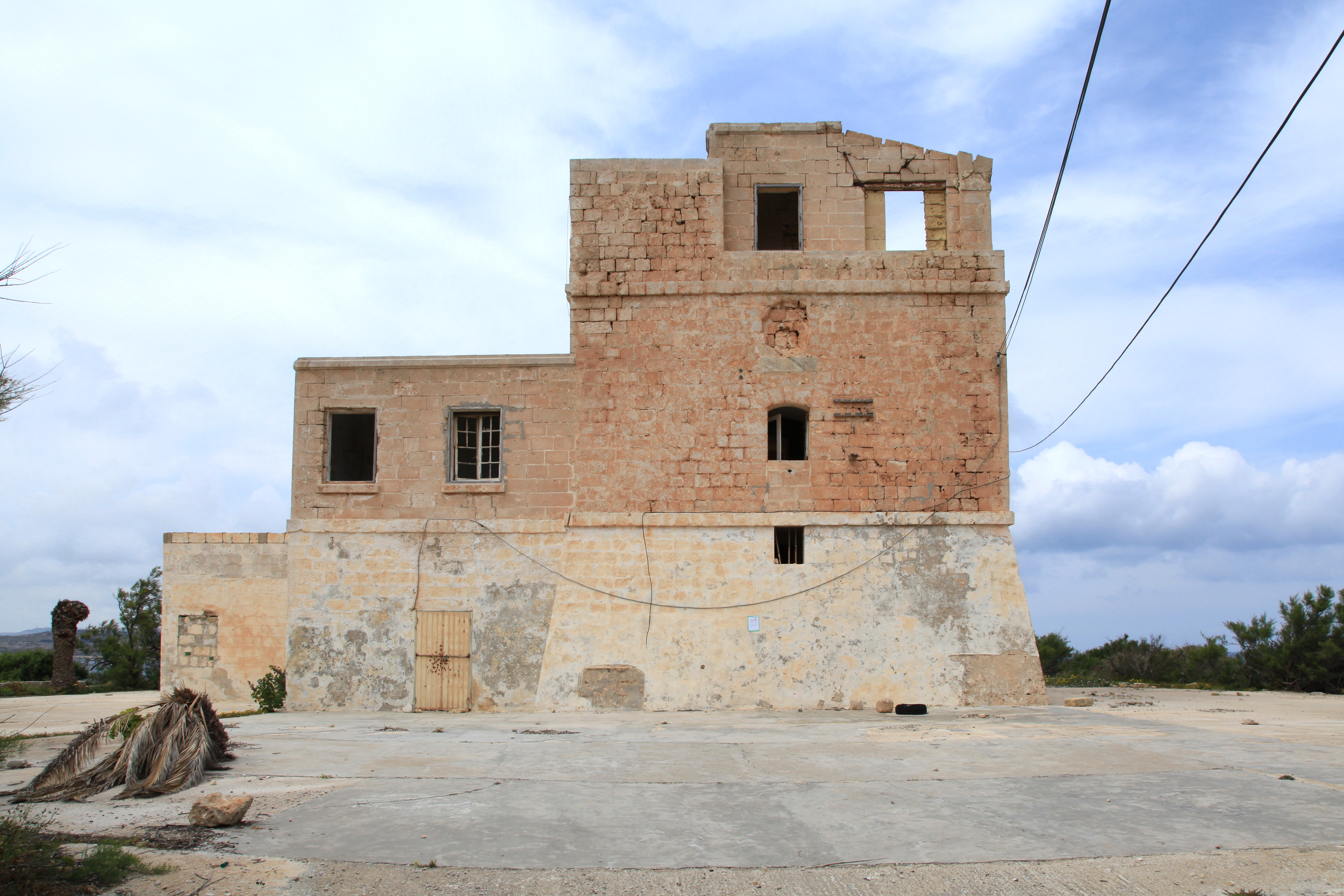
- Aħrax Tower

Site information
- Type: Coastal watchtower Artillery battery
- Owner: Government of Malta
- Controlled by: Mellieħa Local Council - Din l-Art Ħelwa (10 year loan)
- Condition: Intact

Location
- Coordinates: 35°59′43.7″N 14°21′52.2″E

Site history
- Built: 1658 (tower); 1715 (battery)
- Built by: Order of Saint John
- Materials: Limestone

Aħrax Tower (Maltese: Torri tal-Aħrax), originally known as Torre di Lacras, and also known as Armier Tower (Maltese: Torri tal-Armier), Ta' Ħoslien Tower (Maltese: Torri ta' Ħoslien) or the White Tower (Maltese: Torri l-Abjad), is a small watchtower overlooking Armier Bay in the limits of Mellieħa, Malta. It was built in 1658 as the sixth of the De Redin towers. An artillery battery was built around it in 1715. Today, the tower and battery are intact. After receiving 3 years of restoration work the tower was reopened to the public on the 9th of June 2021.

Aħrax Tower is the northernmost fortification on the main island of Malta.

== History ==
Aħrax Tower was built by November 1658 in the area known as "l-Aħrax tal-Mellieħa". Construction had cost 589 scudi, 5 tari and 15 grani. Its structure is similar to the other De Redin towers, having a square base and two floors. However, the base of Aħrax Tower is slightly larger than some of the other towers. An escutcheon once stood over the main doorway with De Redin's coat of arms, although this is no longer in place. Just as was the case with Għajn Ħadid Tower, a well was located close to the tower to supply water to the militia stationed in the tower.

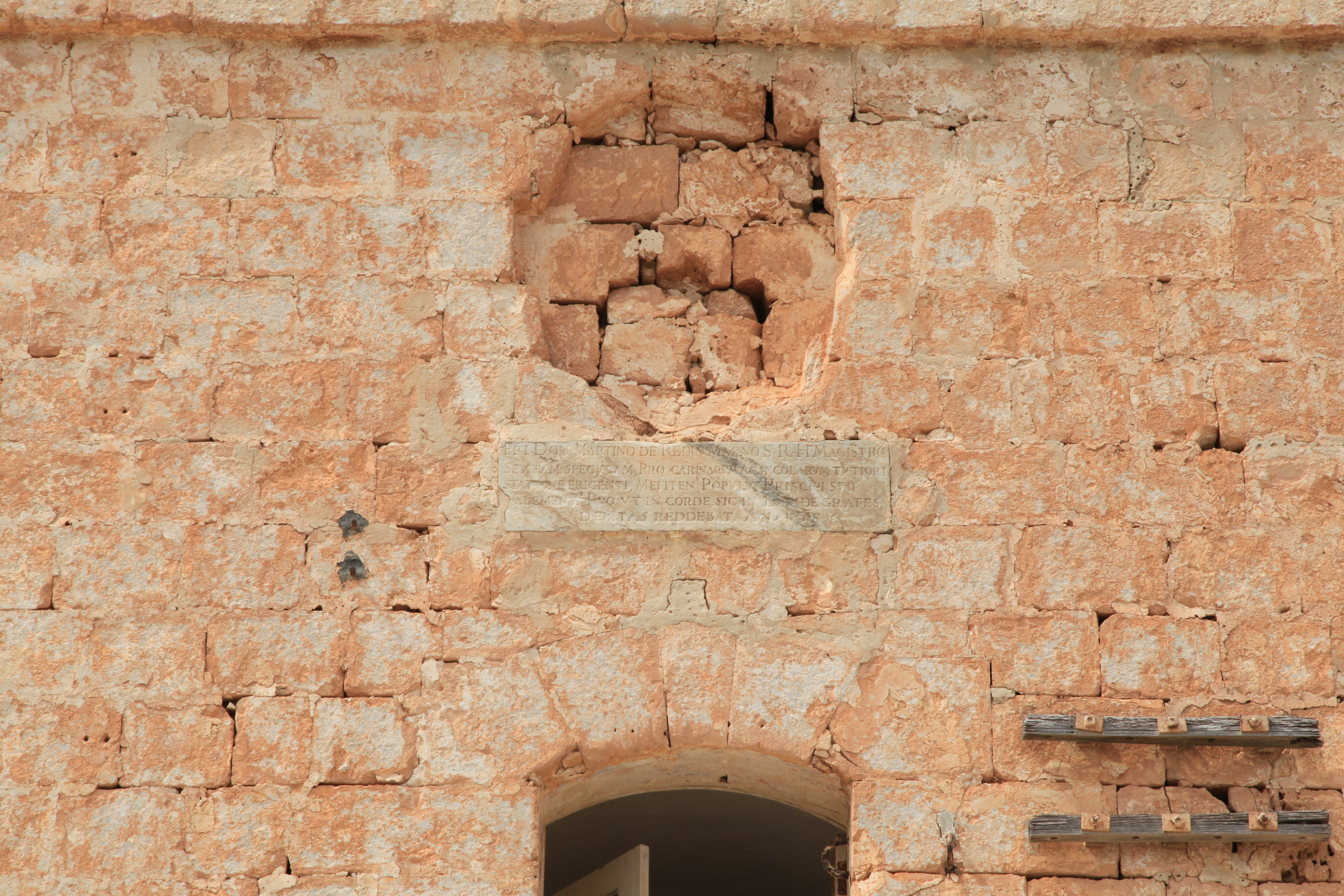
Commemorative plaque and missing escutcheon

In 1715, an artillery battery was built around the tower, and it was called Batteria della Harach. The battery consisted of a semicircular gun platform with an en barbette parapet, a blockhouse that was built on the western wall of the tower, and two walls linking the tower to the gun platform. It was surrounded by a rock hewn ditch.

In the 1743 inspection, Aħrax Tower was armed with two bronze cannons, gun wheels and stocks, sixteen cannonballs, four muskets, one rotolo of musket balls and ten rotolos of gunpowder. Thirty years later, in 1770, the battery was armed with ten iron cannons with 700 iron balls and 150 grapeshot rounds. The gunpowder was stored in Saint Agatha's Tower.

In the 19th century, the British used the tower as a naval station and they added several rooms to the tower's structure. At a point it served as the Governor's summer residence and a British coat of arms replaced De Redin's personal arms. After World War II the tower was privately owned but it was eventually abandoned.

== Present day ==
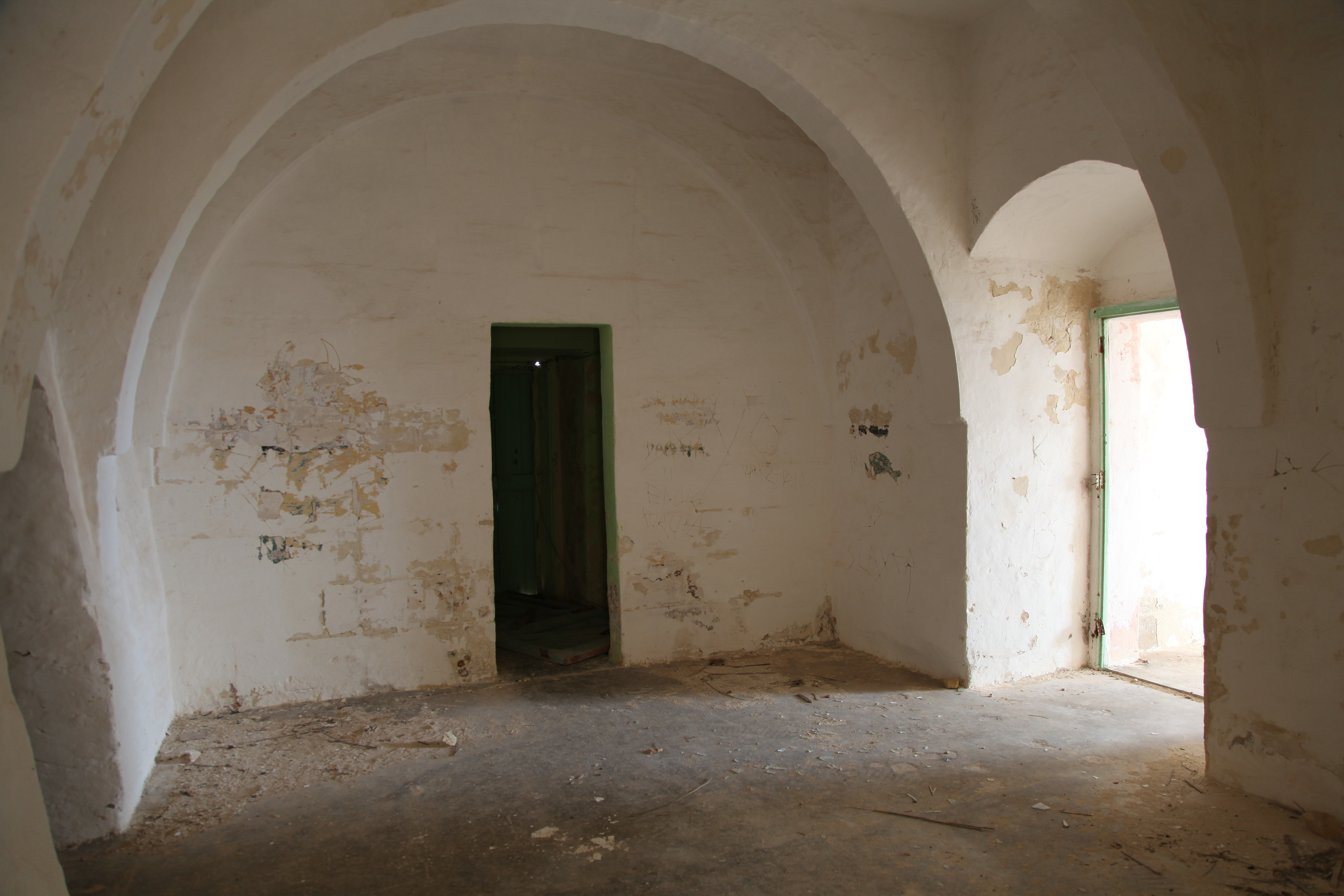
The tower's interior

The area around the tower is now covered with concrete and the foundations of some walls of the battery have never been excavated. Over the years Aħrax Tower was heavily modified so it is now difficult to see which parts are original and which were added later. The battery remains largely intact, with the exception of one of the linking walls. In 2009, the tower was passed to the Mellieħa Local Council.

In November 2016 the tower was granted to heritage NGO Din l-Art Ħelwa for a loan period of 10 years, with the scope of this agreement being the conservation, restoration and rehabilitation of the building. The works were finished in June 2021 and the tower was reopened to the general public for educational purposes.
